= Dahutong Subdistrict =

Dahutong Subdistrict 大胡同街道
- Subdistrict
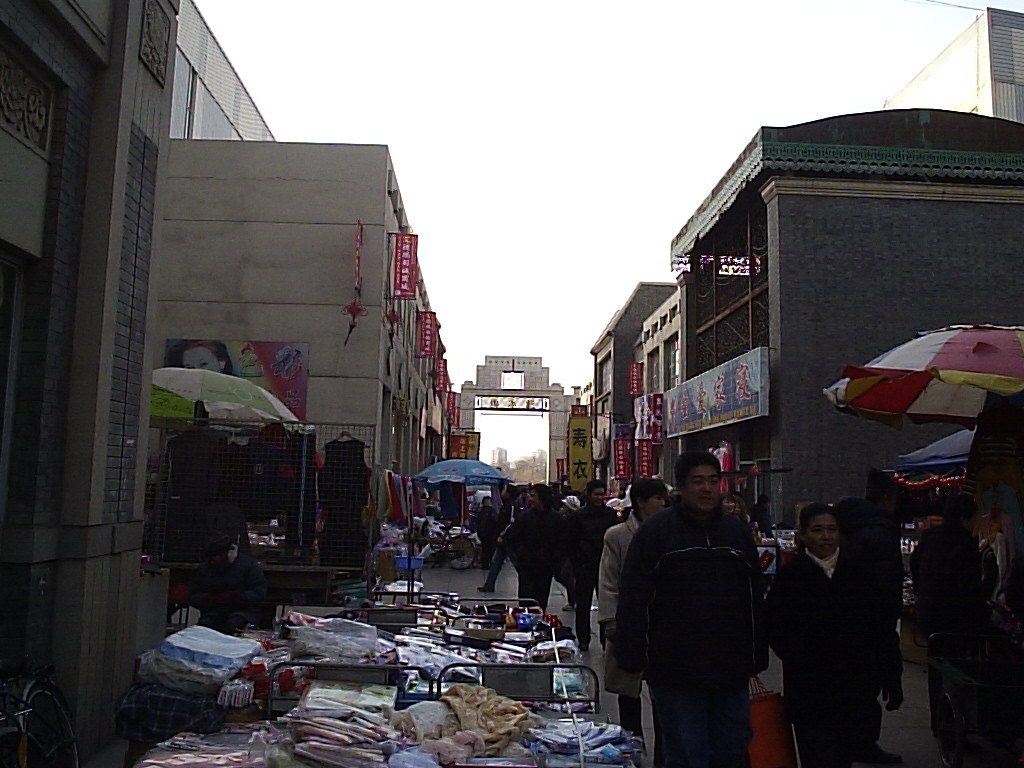
- Guyi Street within the subdistrict, 2016

- Location within Tianjin Location within China
- Coordinates: 39°08′58″N 117°09′59″E
- Country: China
- Municipality: Tianjin
- District: Hongqiao
- Village-level Divisions: 9 communities

Area
  - Total: 0.47 km^{2} (0.18 sq mi)
- Elevation: 9 m (30 ft)

Population (2010)
  - Total: 8,239
  - Density: 18,000/km^{2} (45,000/sq mi)
- Time zone: UTC+8 (China Standard)
- Postal code: 300091
- Area code: 022

Dahutong Subdistrict (Chinese: 大胡同街道; pinyin: Dàhútòng Jiēdào) was a subdistrict situated on the southeastern corner of Hongqiao District, Tianjin, China. It borders Santiaoshi and Hongshunli Subdistricts in its north, Wanghailou Subdistrict in its east, Gulou Subdistrict in its south, and Jieyuan Subdistrict in its west. Its population was 8,239 as of 2010.

The subdistrict was formed in 1954. The name Dahutong literally means "Large Alley". The subject was disbanded in 2019, and its territory has been incorporated into Santiaoshi Subdistrict since.

== Geography ==
Dahutong Subdistrict situates on the south of Nanyun River and the west of Hai River.

== Administrative divisions ==
By 2016, Dahutong Subdistrict consisted of 9 residential communities. They are listed in the table below:

Subdivision names	Name transliterations
大胡同一区	Dahutong Yiqu
大胡同二区	Dahutong Erqu
大胡同三区	Dahutong Sanqu
大胡同四区	Dahutong Siqu
大胡同五区	Dahutong Wuqu
大胡同六区	Dahutong Liuqu
大胡同七区	Dahutong Qiqu
大胡同八区	Dahutong Baqu
大胡同九区	Dahutong Jiuqu
