= Lingdangge Subdistrict =

Lingdangge Subdistrict 铃铛阁街道 Lingdanggao Subdistrict
- Subdistrict
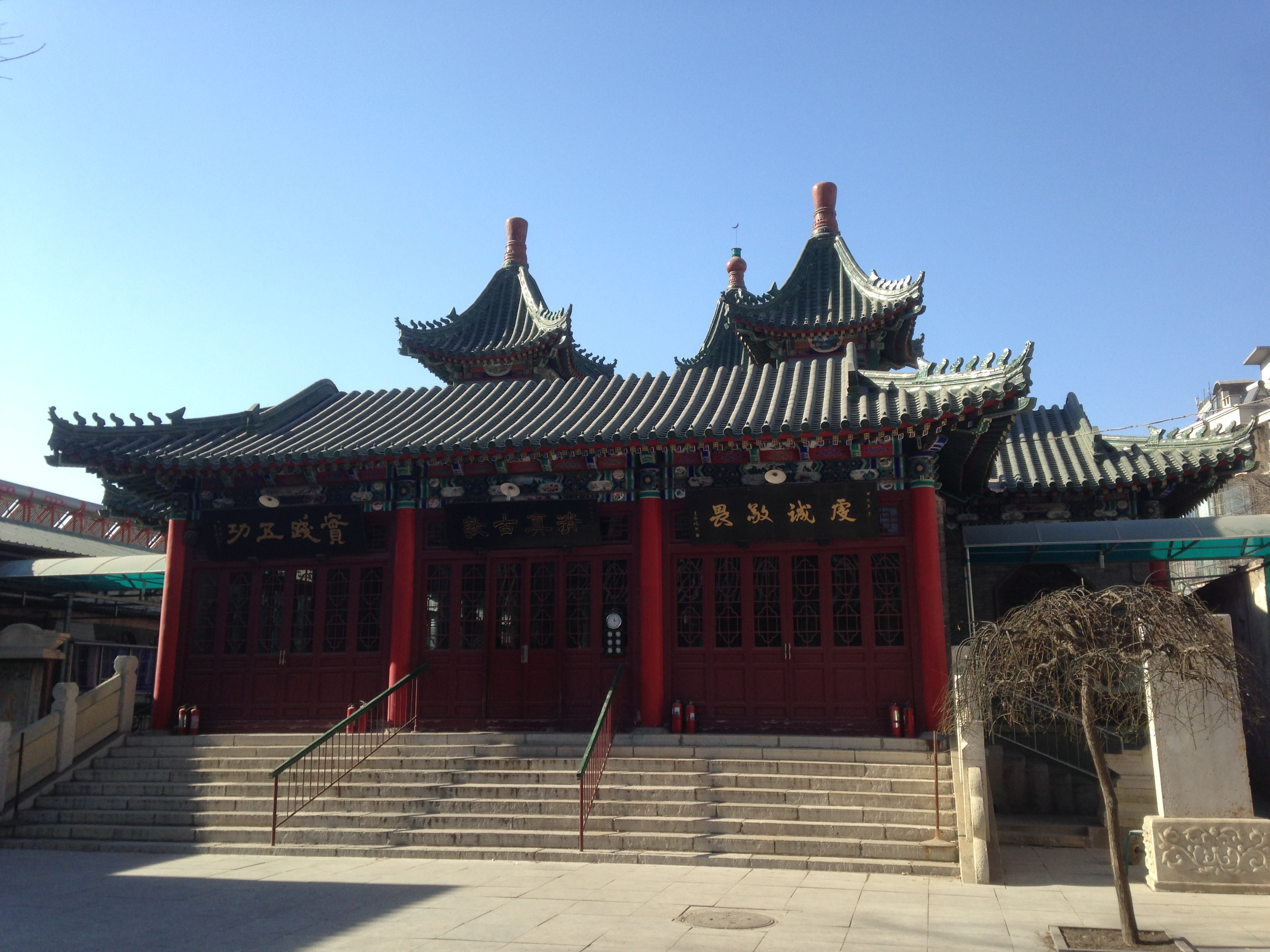
- Grand Mosque of Southern Tianjin within the subdistrict, 2014

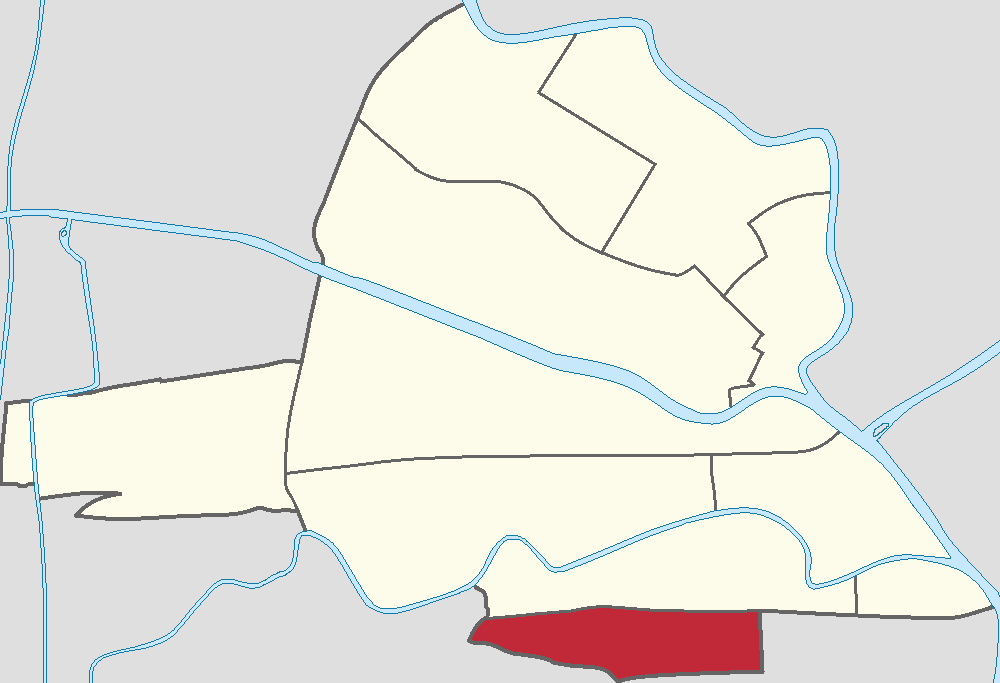
- Location of Lingdangge Subdistrict in Hongqiao District

- Location within Tianjin Location within China
- Coordinates: 39°08′40″N 117°08′22″E
- Country: China
- Municipality: Tianjin
- District: Hongqiao
- Village-level Divisions: 12 communities

Area
  - Total: 1.07 km^{2} (0.41 sq mi)
- Elevation: 6 m (20 ft)

Population (2010)
  - Total: 39,157
  - Density: 36,600/km^{2} (94,800/sq mi)
- Time zone: UTC+8 (China Standard)
- Postal code: 300121
- Area code: 022

Lingdangge Subdistrict (simplified Chinese: 铃铛阁街道; traditional Chinese: 鈴鐺閣街道; pinyin: Língdānggé Jiēdào) is a subdistrict located at the south end of Hongqiao District, Tianjin, China. It borders Jieyuan Subdistrict in the north, Gulou Subdistrict in the east, Guangkai Subdistrict in the south, and Changhong Subdistrict in the south and west. As of 2010, it had a population of 39157.

The subdistrict was founded in 1998. the name Lingdangge (Chinese: 铃铛阁; lit. 'Bell Chamber') comes from a Buddhist Temple that used to exist within the region until 1892. The name is often pronounced as "Lingdanggao" among the locals.

== Administrative divisions ==
In the year 2021, Lingdangge Subdistrict consisted of 12 residential communities. They are, by the order of their Administrative division codes:

Subdivision names	Name transliterations
乐安里	Le'anli
晓春里	Xiaochunli
庆丰里	Qingfengli
南头窑	Nantouyao
铃铛阁	Lingdangge
永明寺	Yongmingsi
小道子	Xiaodaozi
西关北里委	Xiguan Beiliwei
明华里	Minghuali
新春花苑	Xinchun Huayuan
睦华里	Muhuali
万华里	Wanhuali

== See also ==
- List of township-level divisions of Tianjin
