= Hongqiao, Tianjin =

Coordinates: 39°10′11″N 117°09′07″E

Hongqiao 红桥区
- District
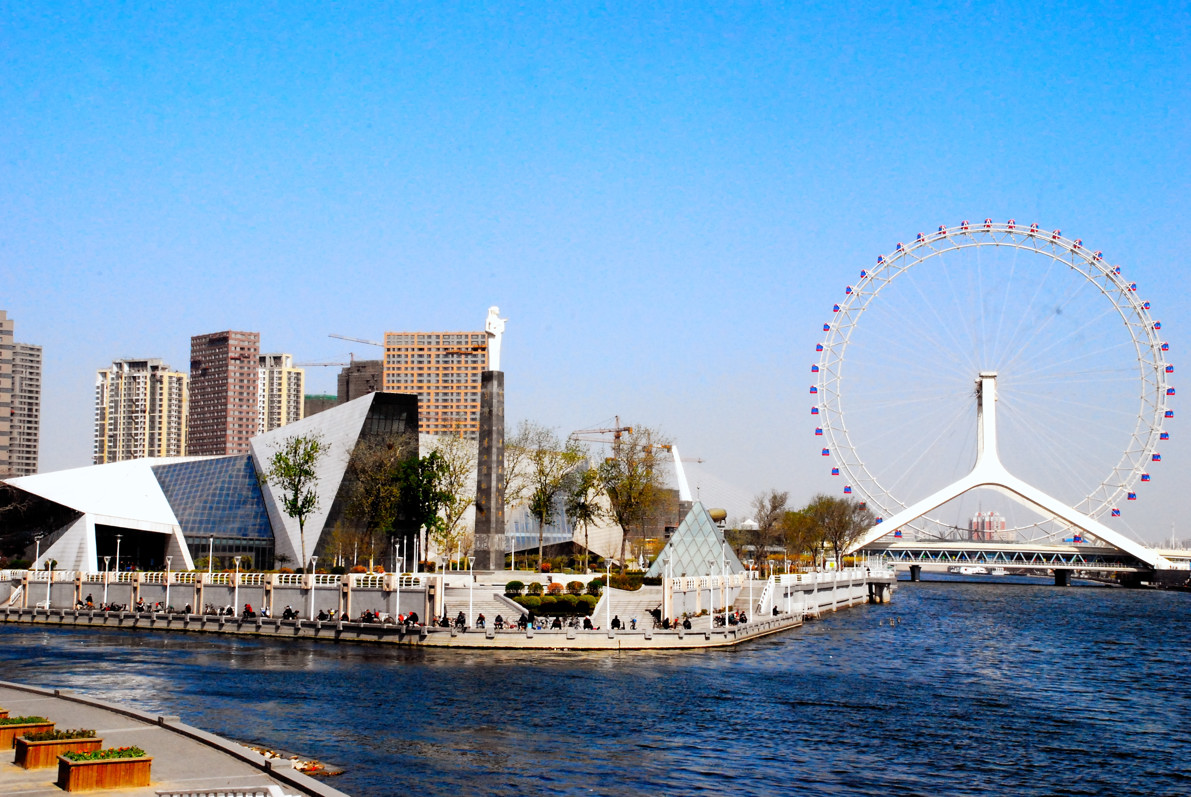
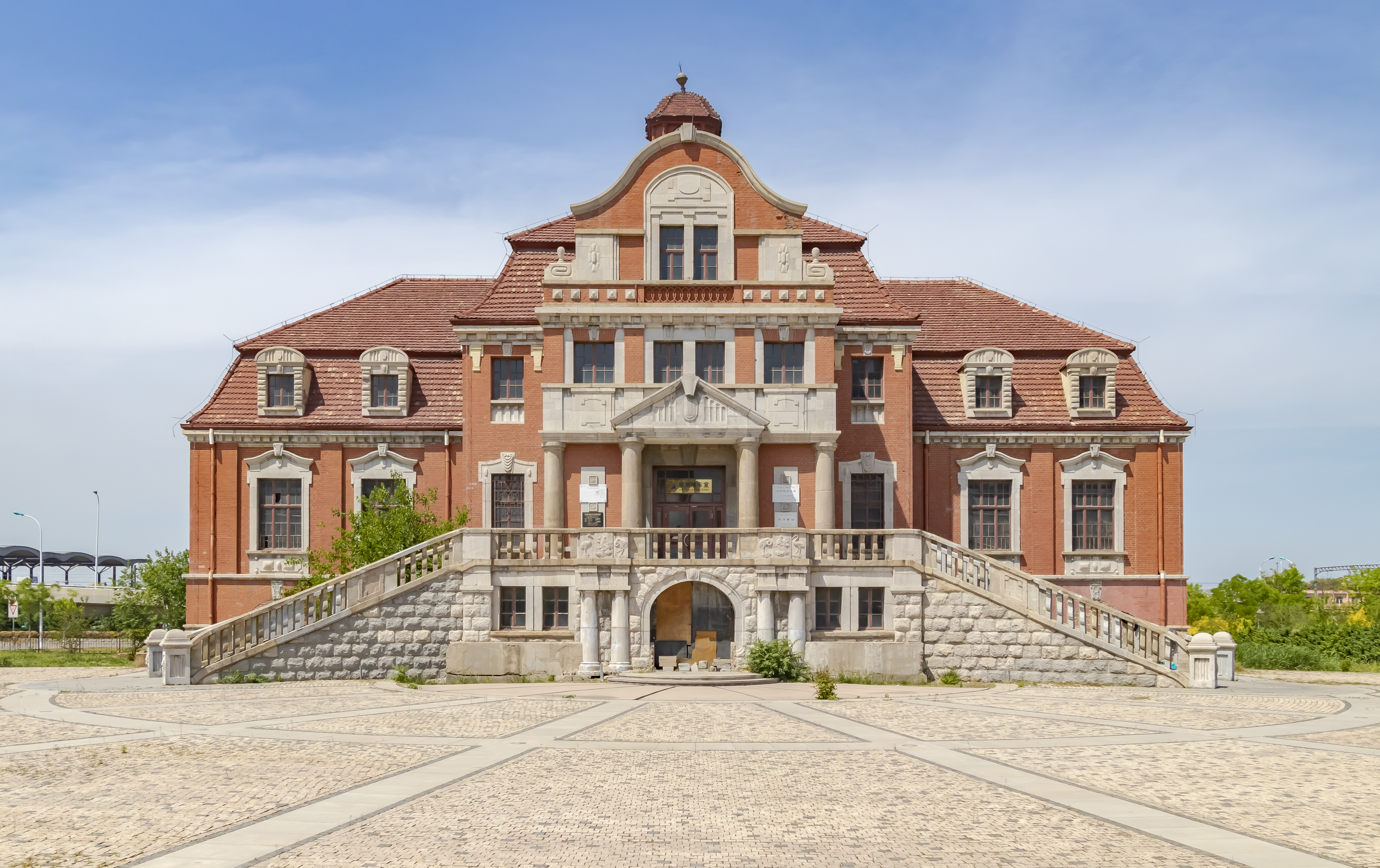
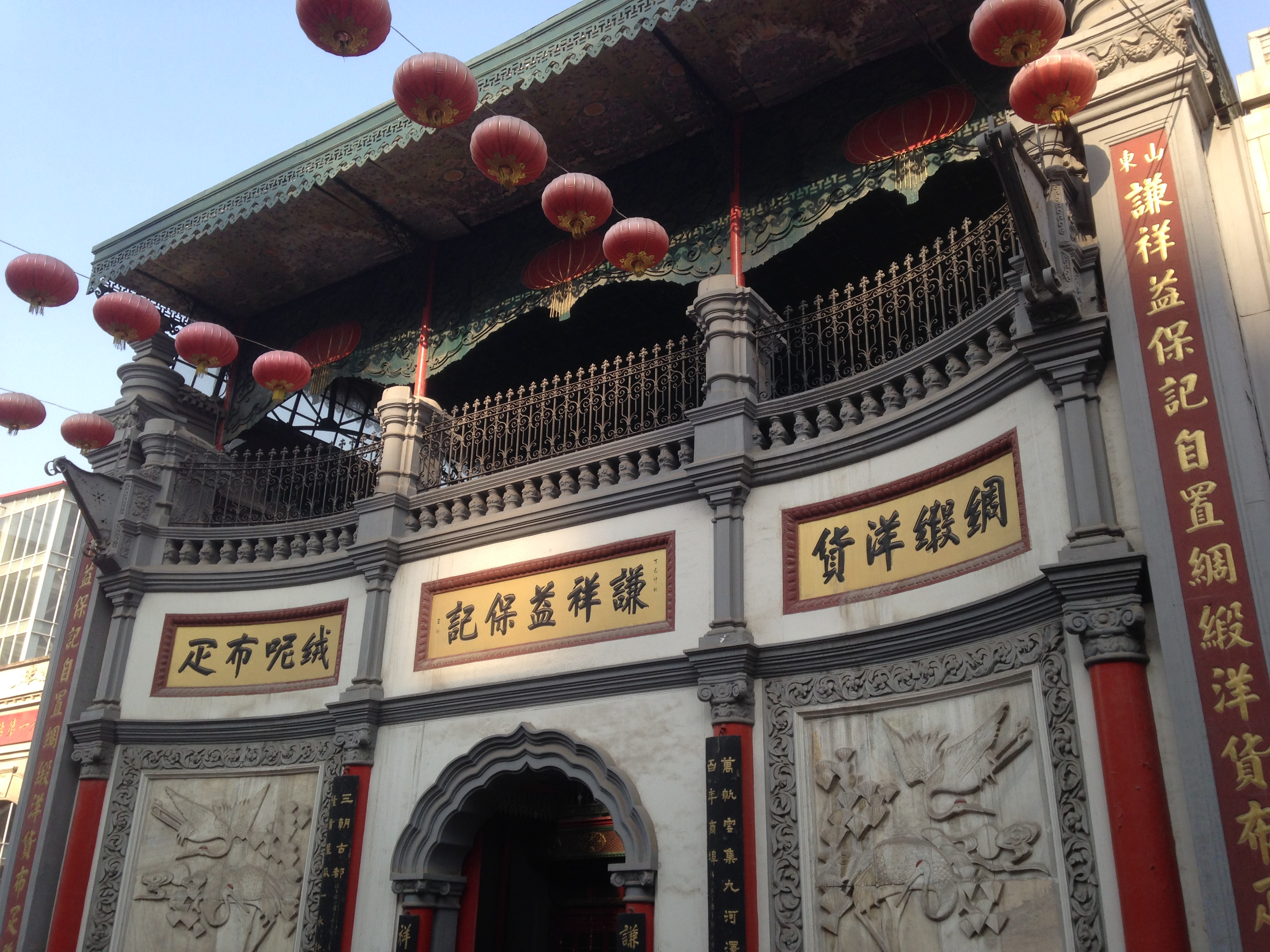
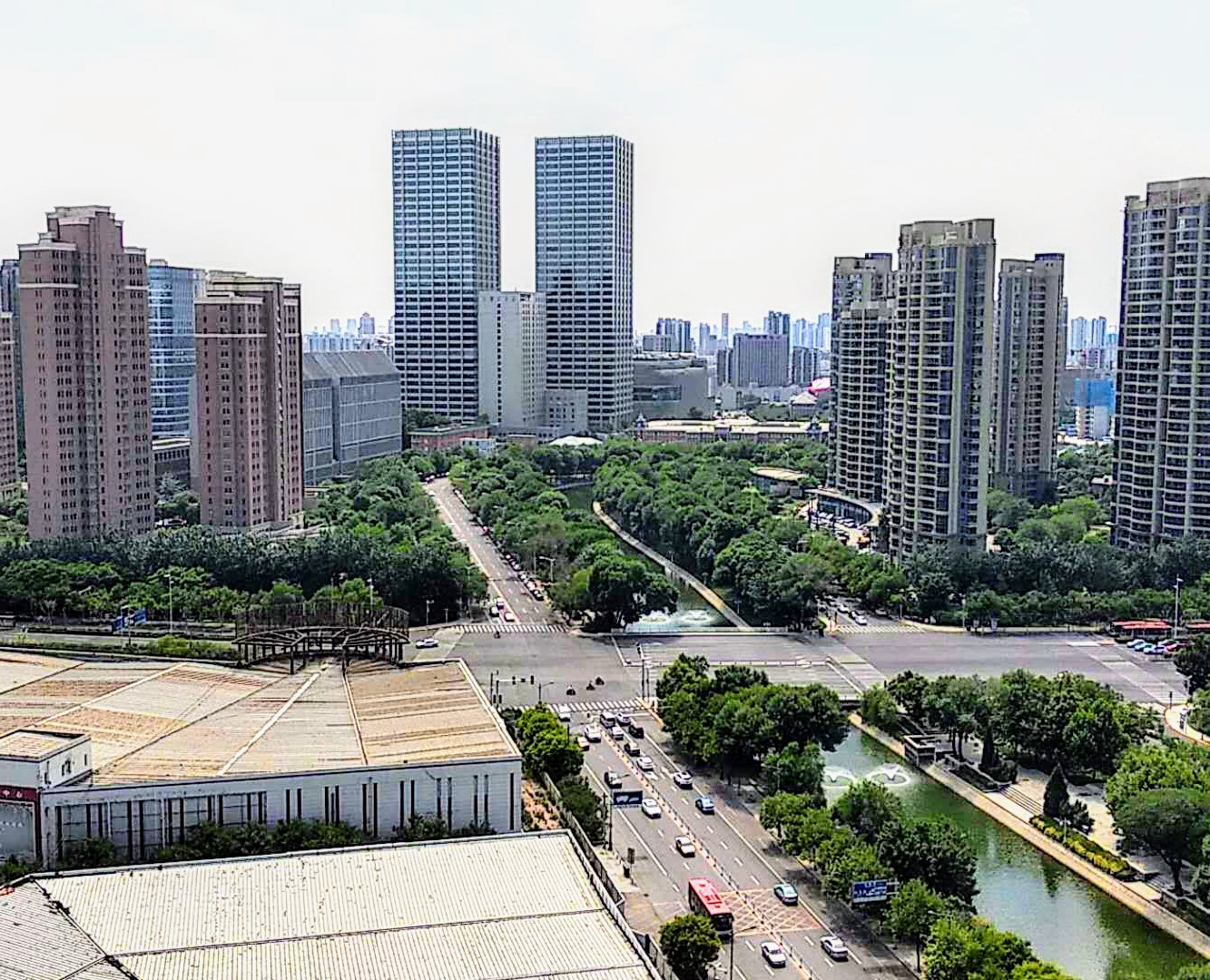
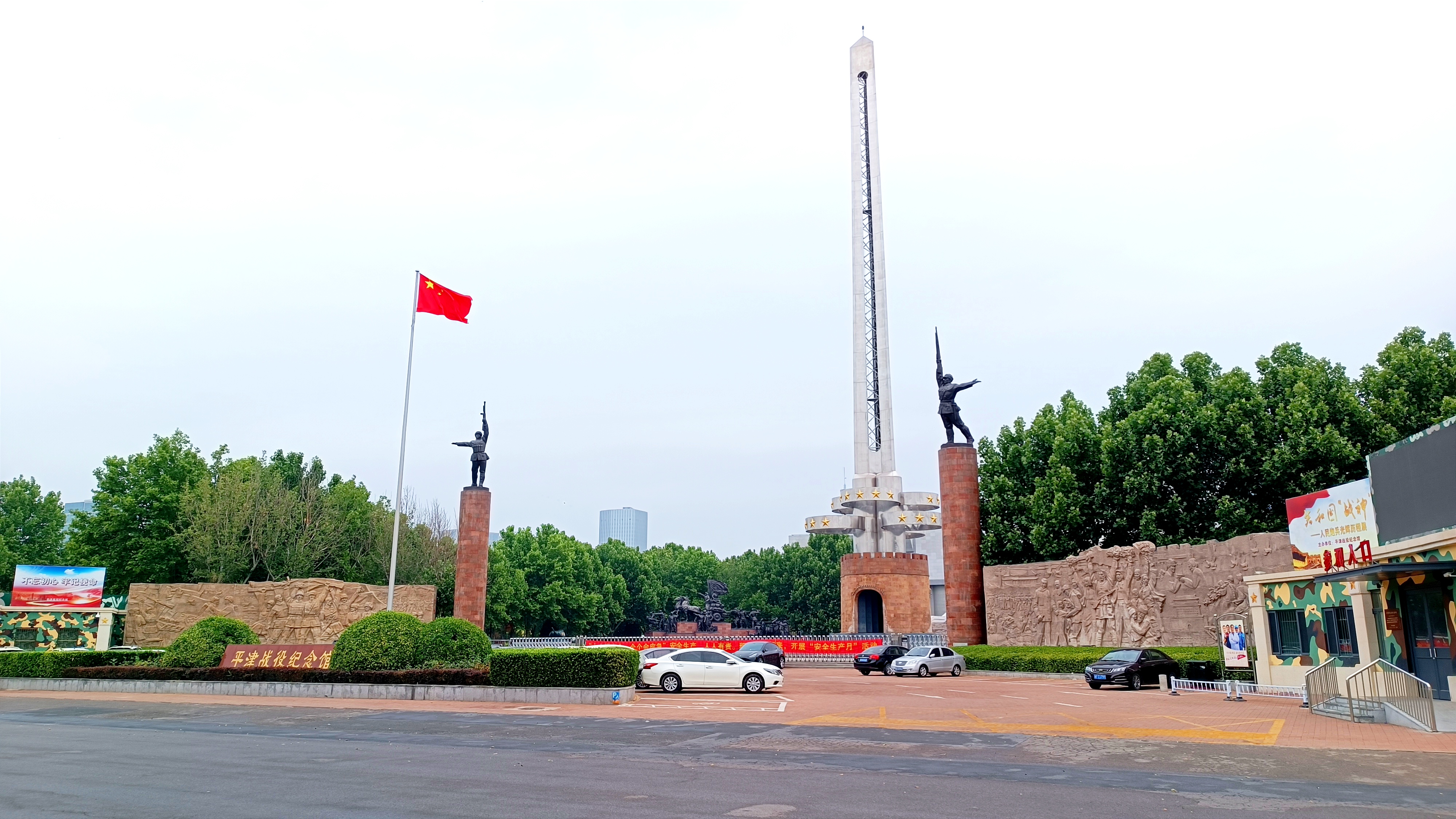
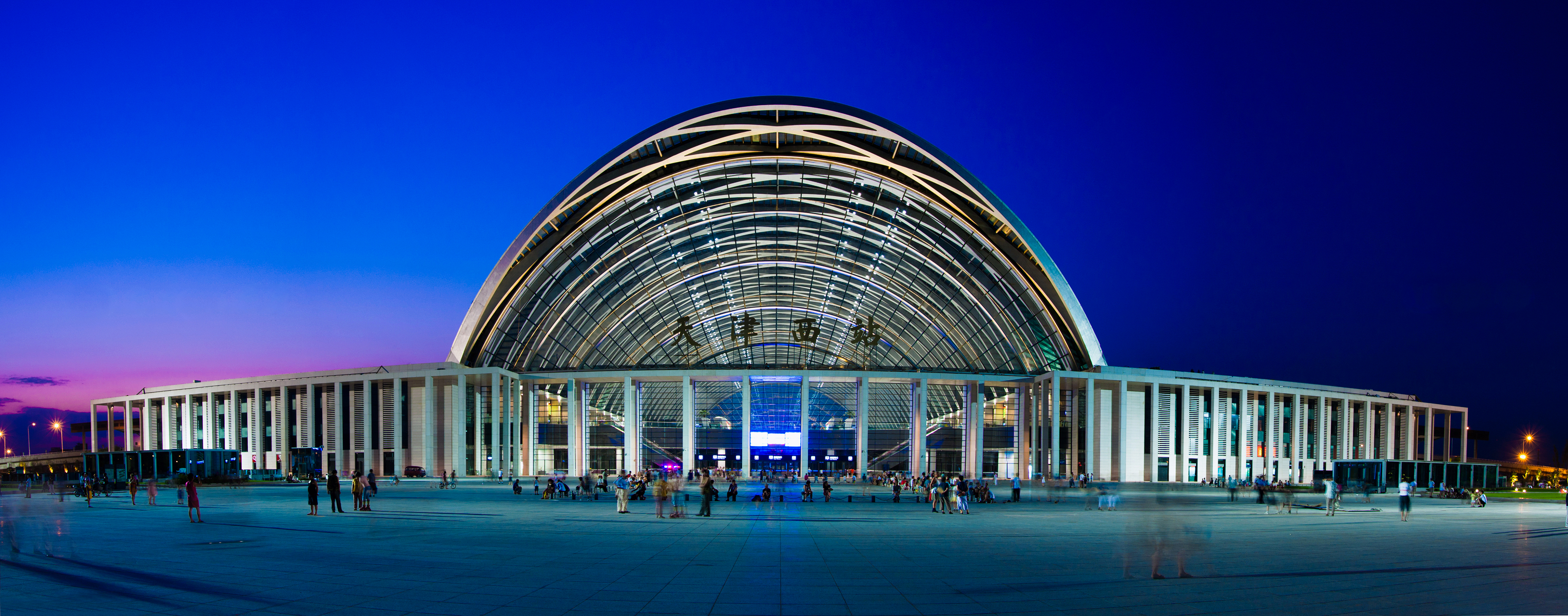
- Interactive map of Hongqiao
- Country: China
- Municipality: Tianjin

Area
  - Total: 21.3 km^{2} (8.2 sq mi)

Population (2020)
  - Total: 483,130
  - Density: 22,700/km^{2} (58,700/sq mi)
- Time zone: UTC+8 (China Standard)
- Postal code: 300171
- Area code(s): 0022; HMQ (Division code)
Tianjin district map
Subdivisions of Tianjin
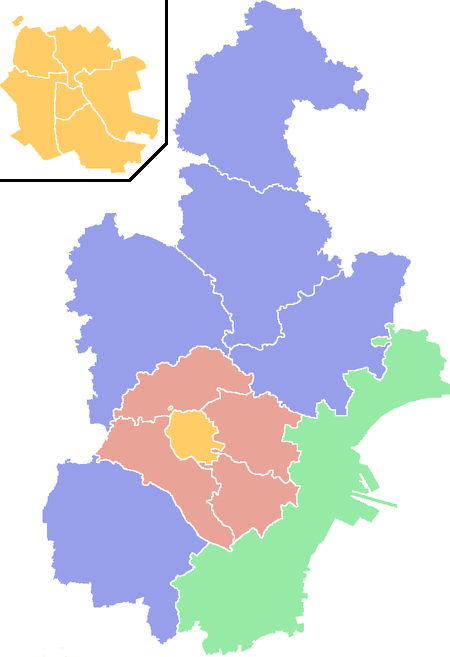
Core districts See inset
1	Heping
2	Hedong
3	Hexi
4	Nankai
5	Hebei
6	Hongqiao
Suburbs
7	Dongli
8	Xiqing
9	Jinnan
10	Beichen
Binhai and Rural
13	Binhai	14	Ninghe
11	Wuqing	15	Jinghai
12	Baodi	16	Ji Zhou
- Website: tjhqqzf.gov.cn

Hongqiao District (simplified Chinese: 红桥区; traditional Chinese: 紅橋區; pinyin: Hóngqiáo Qū) is a district in the city of Tianjin, China. The name of the district derives from the name of a bridge - Dahong Bridge (大红桥; 大虹橋; Dàhóng Qiáo; 'big red bridge') - on the Ziya River, a tributary of Hai River.

== Administrative divisions ==
Name	Chinese (S)	Hanyu Pinyin	Population (2010)	Area (km^{2})
Xiyuzhuang Subdistrict	西于庄街道	Xīyúzhuāng Jiēdào	80,888	3.89
Xianyang North Road Subdistrict	咸阳北路街道	Xiányángběilù Jiēdào	74,799	2.42
Dingzigu Subdistrict	丁字沽街道	Dīngzìgū Jiēdào	98,652	2.47
Xigu Subdistrict	西沽街道	Xīgū Jiēdào	86,971	4.77
Santiaoshi Subdistrict	三条石街道	Sāntiáoshí Jiēdào	19,255	1.37
Shaogongzhuang Subdistrict	邵公庄街道	Shàogōngzhuāng Jiēdào	54,413	3.12
Jieyuan Subdistrict	芥园街道	Jièyuán Jiēdào	33,212	1.64
Lingdangge Subdistrict	铃铛阁街道	Língdānggé Jiēdào	39,157	
Dahutong Subdistrict	大胡同街道	Dàhútòng Jiēdào	8,239	
Heyuan Subdistrict	和苑街道	Héyuàn Jiēdào	not established	

== Transportation ==
=== Metro ===
Hongqiao is currently served by one metro lines operated by Tianjin Metro:

- Line 1 - Xibeijiao, Xizhan, Honghuli, Qinjiandao, Benxilu

== Education ==
Schools include:

- Wellington College International Tianjin
- Tianjin No. 3 High School
