= Shaogongzhuang Subdistrict =

Shaogongzhuang Subdistrict 邵公庄街道
- Subdistrict
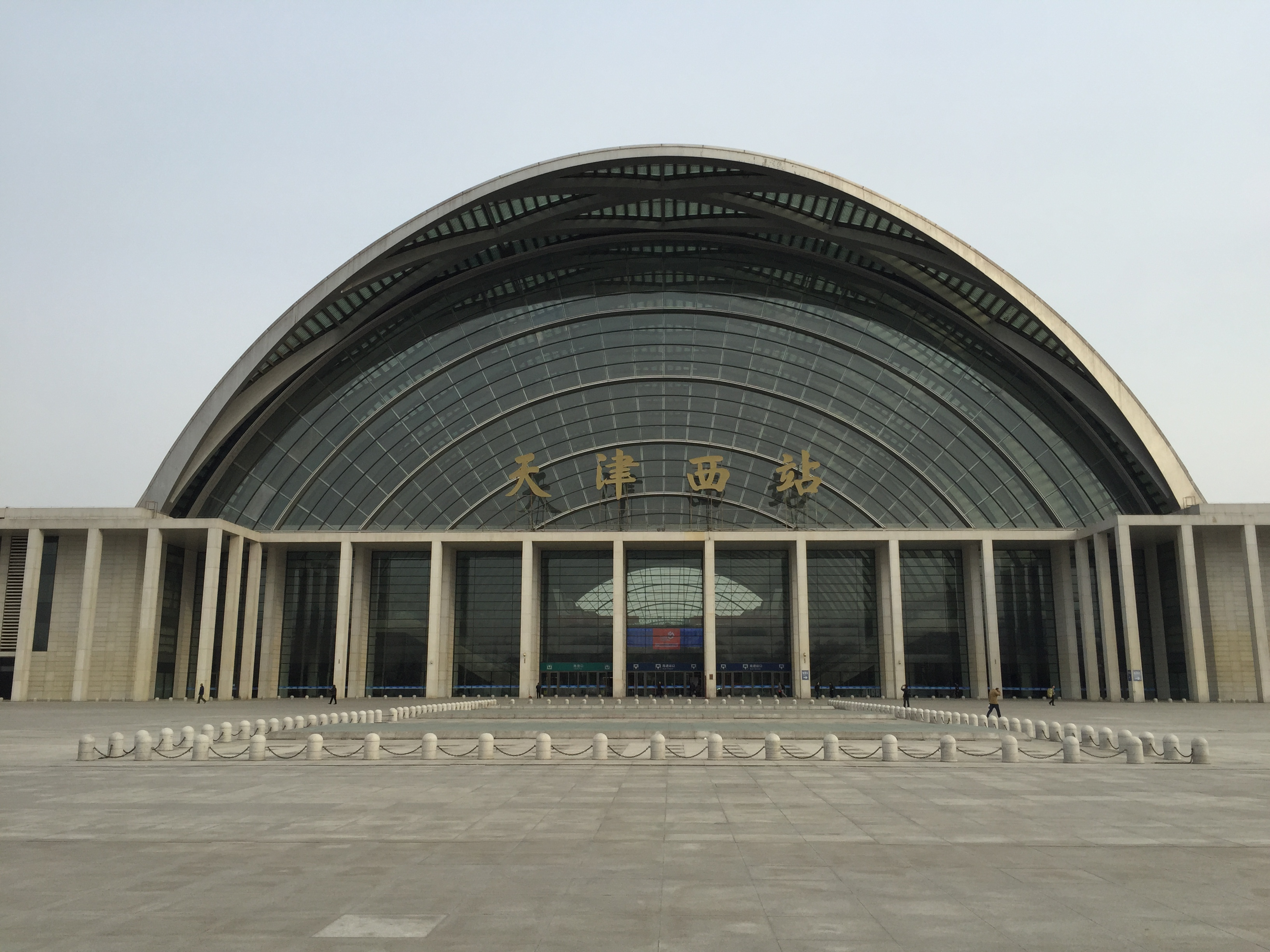
- Tianjin West Railway Station on the northeast of the subdistrict, 2016

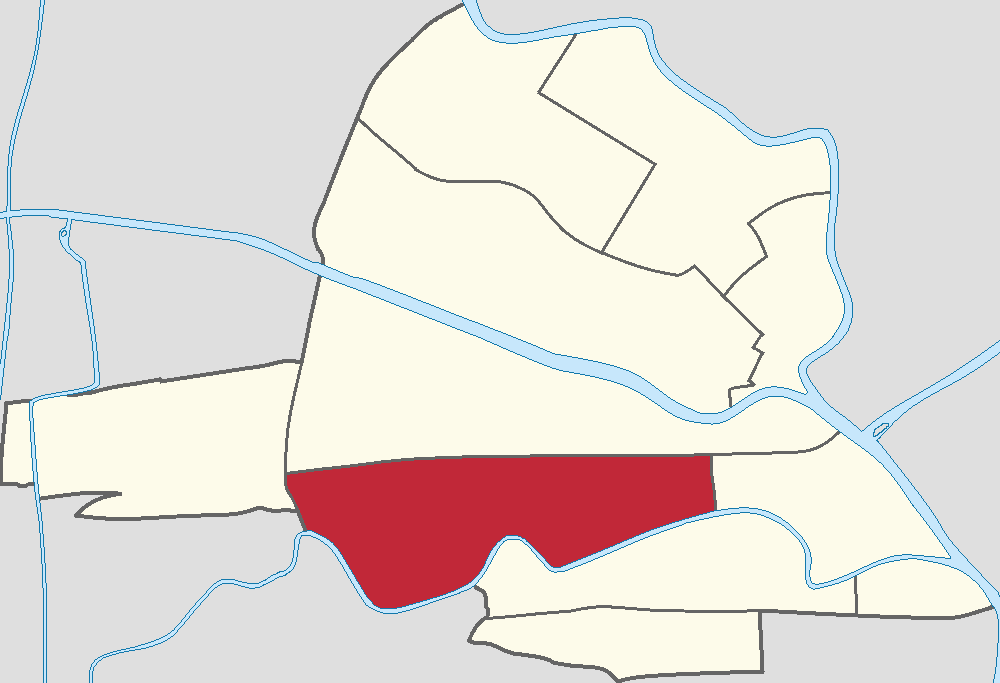
- Location of Shaogongzhuang Subdistrict in Hongqiao District

- Location within Tianjin Location within China
- Coordinates: 39°09′12″N 117°08′56″E
- Country: China
- Municipality: Tianjin
- District: Hongqiao
- Village-level Divisions: 13 communities

Area
  - Total: 2.88 km^{2} (1.11 sq mi)
- Elevation: 7 m (23 ft)

Population (2010)
  - Total: 54,413
  - Density: 18,900/km^{2} (48,900/sq mi)
- Time zone: UTC+8 (China Standard)
- Postal code: 300122
- Area code: 022

Shaogongzhuang Subdistrict (simplified Chinese: 邵公庄街道; traditional Chinese: 邵公莊街道; pinyin: Shàogōngzhuāng Jiēdào) is a subdistrict located in the south of Hongqiao District, Tianjin, China. It borders Xigu Subdistrict to the north, Santiaoshi Subdistrict to the east, Jieyuan Subdistrict to the southeast, Changhong and Xiangyang Road Subdistrict to the south, as well as Xiyingmen and Heyuan Subdsitricts to the west. It had 54,413 inhabitants as of 2010.

The subdistrict was founded in 1952. Its name literally means "Mr. Shao‘s Manor’.

== Geography ==
Shaogongzhuang subdistrict situates north of the Nanyun River.

== Administrative divisions ==
At the end of 2021, Shaogongzhuang Subdistrict was divided into 13 residential communities. They are listed as follows:

Subdivision names	Name transliterations
建设里	Jiansheli
中联	Zhonglian
西青道第二	Xiqingdao Di'er
西青道第三	Xiqingdao Disan
西青道第四	Xiqingdao Disi
杨庄子	Yangzhuangzi
咸阳	Xianyang
前园	Qianyuan
幸福里第二	Xingfuli Di'er
幸福里第一	Xingfuli Diyi
洛川里	Luochuanli
仁爱花园	Ren'ai Huayuan
千禧园	Qianxiyuan

== See also ==
- List of township-level divisions of Tianjin
