= Tianjin No. 3 High School =

School in Tianjin, China

- Traditional Chinese: 天津市第三中學
- Simplified Chinese: 天津市第三中学
Transcriptions
Standard Mandarin
- Hanyu Pinyin: Tiānjīn Shì Dì Sān Zhōngxué
- Wade–Giles: T'ien1chin1 Shih4 Ti3 San1 Chung1hsueh2
Yue: Cantonese
- Jyutping: Tin1zin1 Si5 Dai3 Saam1 Zung1hok6
- Hongqiao District, Tianjin; China

Information
- Former name: Hebei Provincial No. 1 High School (Chinese: 河北省立第一中学)
- Established: 1901
- Website: sz.hqjy.net

Tianjin No. 3 High School (Chinese: 天津市第三中学) is located on Xiangdong Road in Hongqiao District of Tianjin, China. The school was established in 1901 and is the oldest modern public middle school in Tianjin. The school was founded in 1901 as Hebei Provincial No. 1 High School (Chinese: 河北省立第一中学) before being renamed to Tianjin No. 3 High School (Chinese: 天津市第三中学) in 1949. The school had various names over the years, including Bell Tower Middle School. In 1982, UNDP and UNESCO provided the school with new equipment.

It is a key high school (Chinese: 重點中學) in Tianjin.

== Notable alumni ==
- Liu Bingsen, calligrapher
- Liu Guangjun, nuclear physicist
- Ren Zhongyi, politician

== See also ==
- Gao Lingwen
