= Xigu =

Xigu can refer to:

- Xigu District (西固区), a district in Lanzhou, Gansu, China
- Xigu Subdistrict (西沽街道), a subdistrict in Tianjin, China
- Xigu arsenal, Qing dynasty imperial arsenal
