= Xigu Subdistrict =

Xigu Subdistrict 西沽街道
- Subdistrict
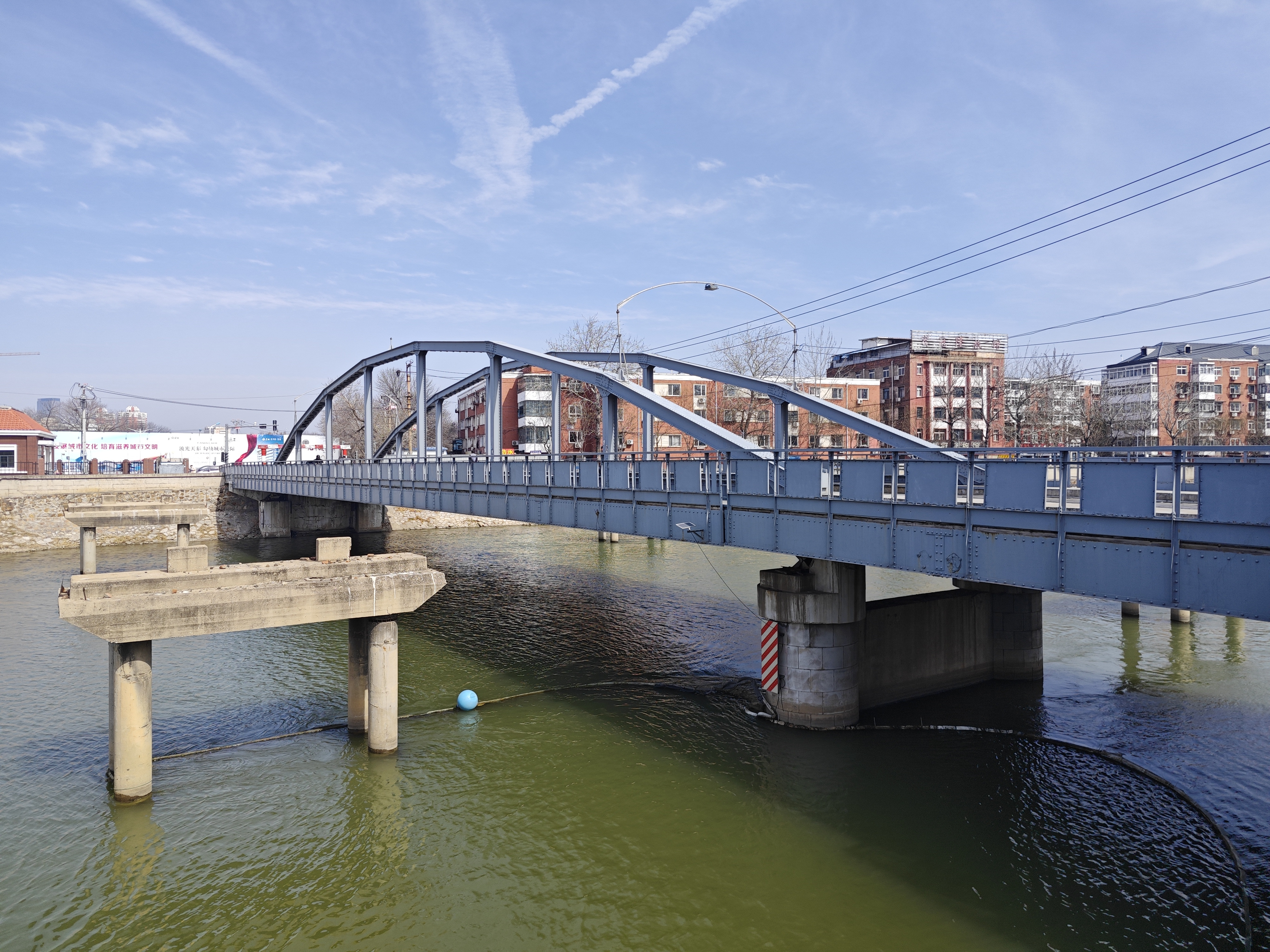
- Dahong Bridge on the eastern side of the subdistrict, 2026

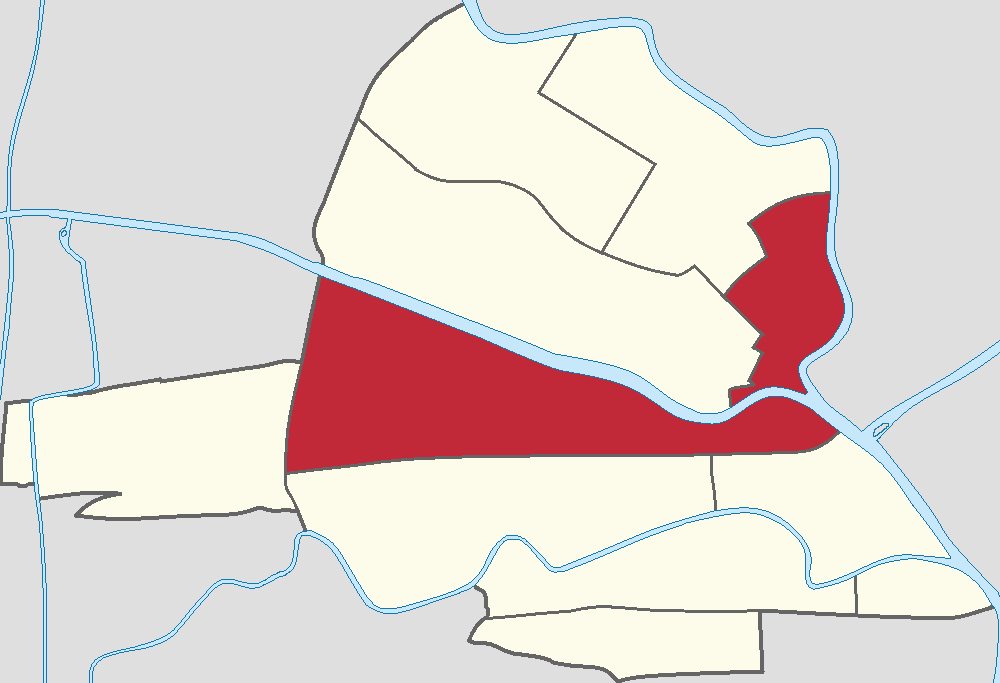
- Location of Xigu Subdistrict within Hongqiao District

- Location within Tianjin Location within China
- Coordinates: 39°10′25″N 117°09′30″E
- Country: China
- Municipality: Tianjin
- District: Hongqiao
- Village-level Divisions: 20 communities

Area
  - Total: 4.77 km^{2} (1.84 sq mi)
- Elevation: 7 m (23 ft)

Population (2010)
  - Total: 86,971
  - Density: 18,200/km^{2} (47,200/sq mi)
- Time zone: UTC+8 (China Standard)
- Postal code: 300132
- Area code: 022

Xigu Subdistrict (Chinese: 西沽街道; pinyin: Xīgū Jiēdào) is one of the 9 subdistricts of Hongqiao District, Tianjin, China. It is located to the south of Xiyuzhuang and Dingzigu Subdistricts, west of Xinkaihe Subdistrict, north of Santiaoshi and Shaogongzhuang Subdistricts, as well as east of Heyuan and Xigongmen Subdistricts. In the year 2010, the subdistrict had a population of 86,971.

Its name Xigu (Chinese: 西沽; lit. 'West Gu') refers to the subdistrict's location west of the Gu River (now known as North Canal).

== Geography ==
Xigu subdistrict is located on the north of Ziya River and west of the northern section of Grand Canal.

== History ==
Timeline of Xigu Subdistrict
Year	Status	Under
1952 - 1954	Xigu Street	8th District, Tianjin
1954 - 1956	Xigu Subdistrict	8th District, Tianjin
1956 - 1966	Xigu Subdistrict	Hongqiao District, Tianjin
1966 - 1968	Xigu Subdistrict	Hongwei District, Tianjin
1968–present	Xigu Subdistrict	Hongqiao District, Tianjin

== Administrative divisions ==
By the year 2021, Xigu Subdistrict had 20 residential communities. They are listed in the table below:

Subdivision names	Name transliterations
仁和里	Renheli
涟源里	Lianyuanli
湘潭道	Xiangtandao
桥南	Qiaonan
运河西	Yunhe Xi
东庞	Longpang
西沽大街	Xigu Dajie
桃林	Taolin
青春南里	Qingchun Nanli
燕宇	Yanyu
流霞里	Liuxiali
水竹花园	Shuizhu Huayuan
水木天成第一	Shuimu Tiancheng Diyi
水木天成第二	Shuimu Tiancheng Di'er
水木天成第三	Shuimu Tiancheng Disan
河怡花园	Heyi Huayuan
民畅园	Minchangyuan
龙禧园第一	Longxiyuan Diyi
龙禧园第二	Longxiyuan Di'er
西河名邸	Xihe Mingdi

== Gallery ==
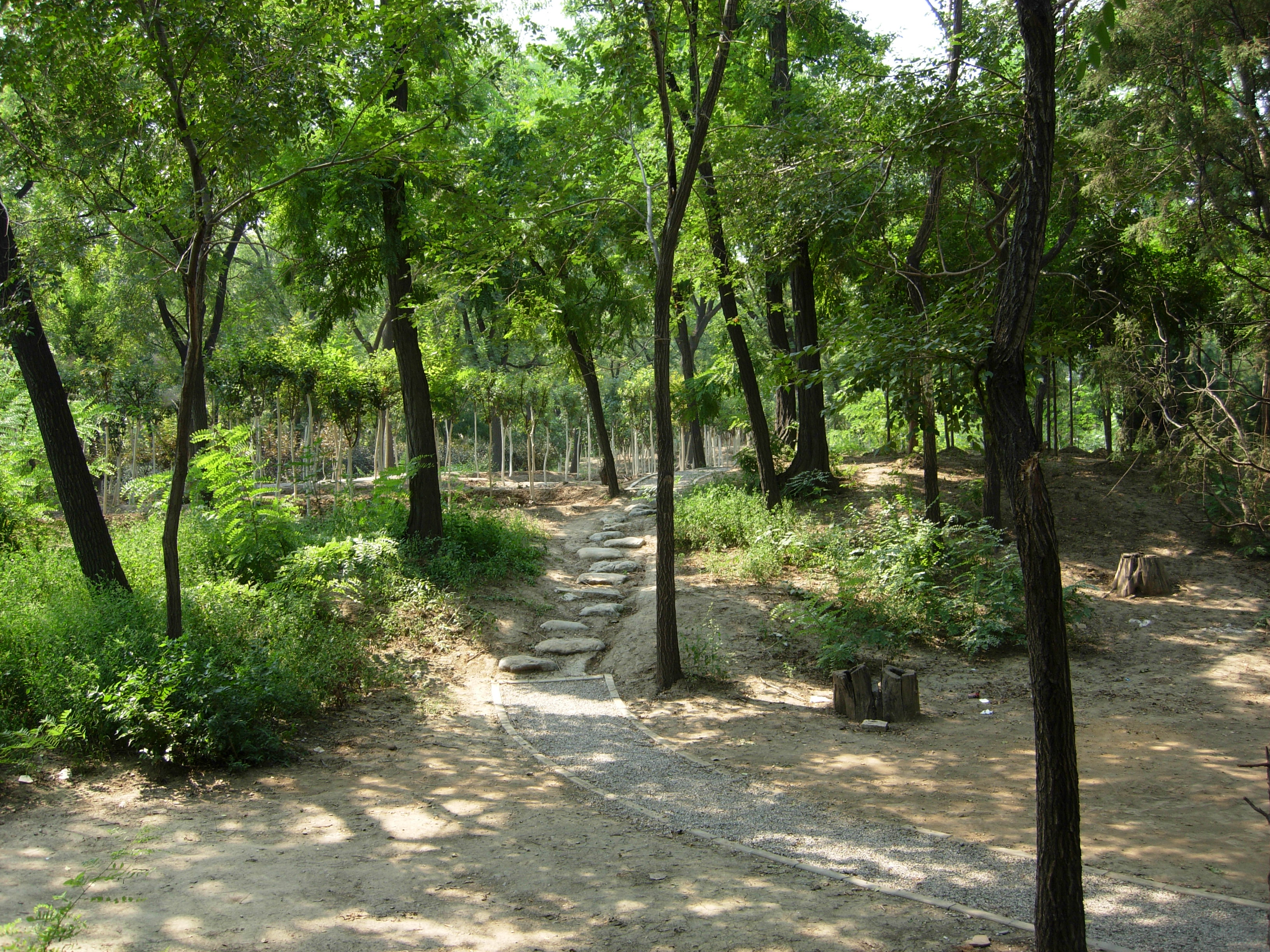
Forest trail within Xigu Park, 2007

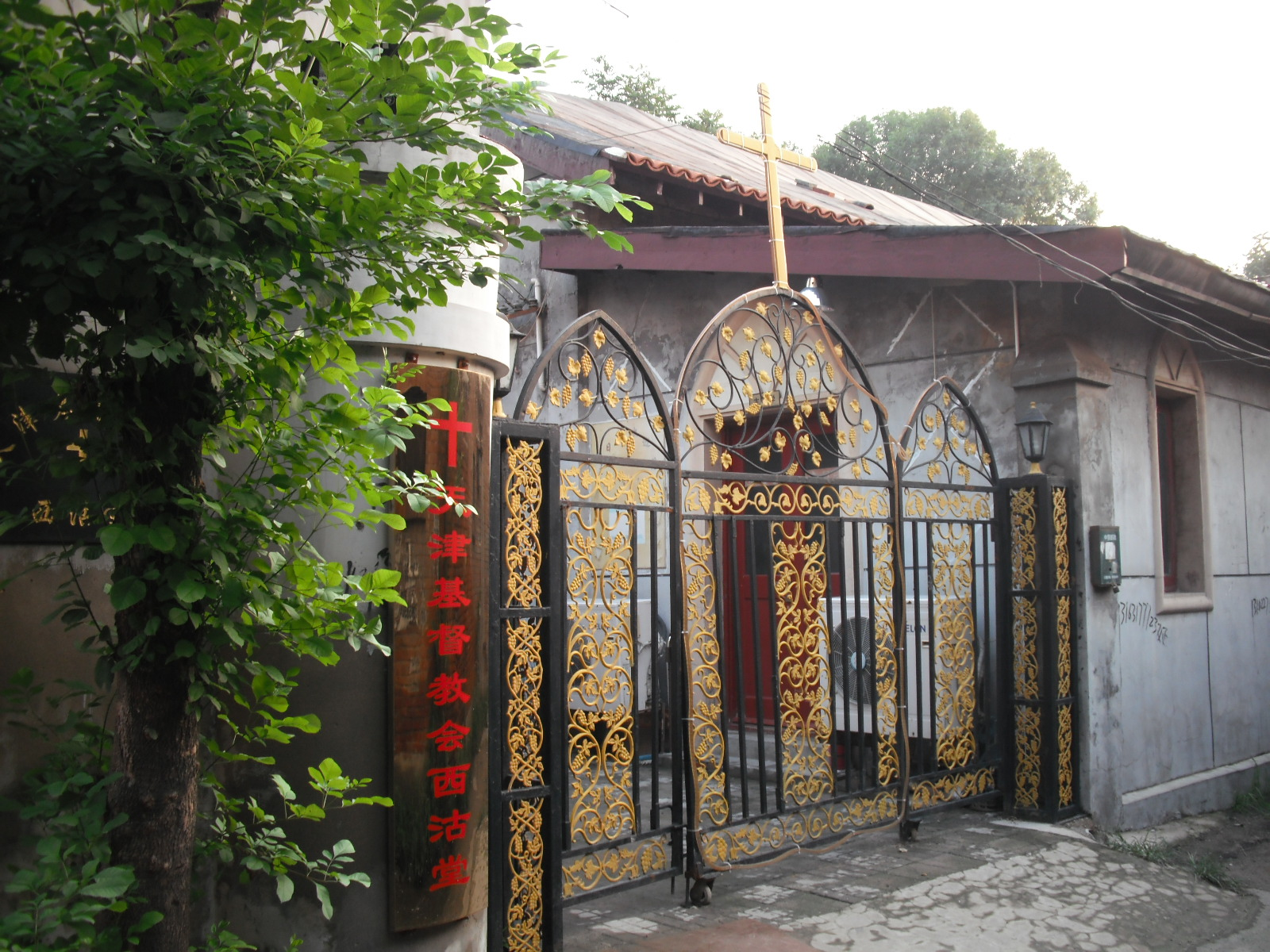
A church within the subdistrict, 2011

== See also ==
- List of township-level divisions of Tianjin
