= Dingzigu Subdistrict =

Dingzigu Subdistrict 丁字沽街道
- Subdistrict
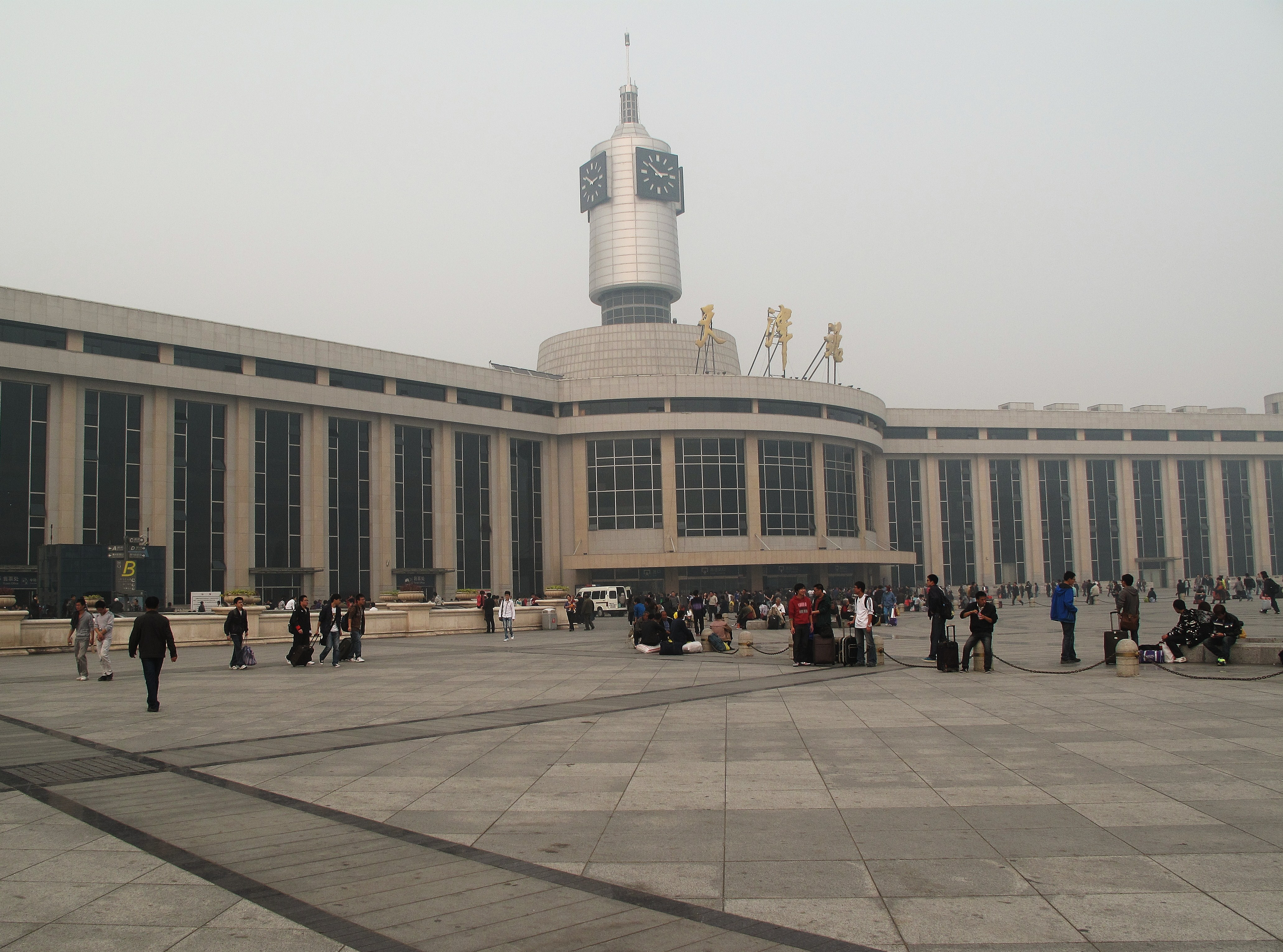
- Tianjin Train Station located inside the subdistrict, 2011

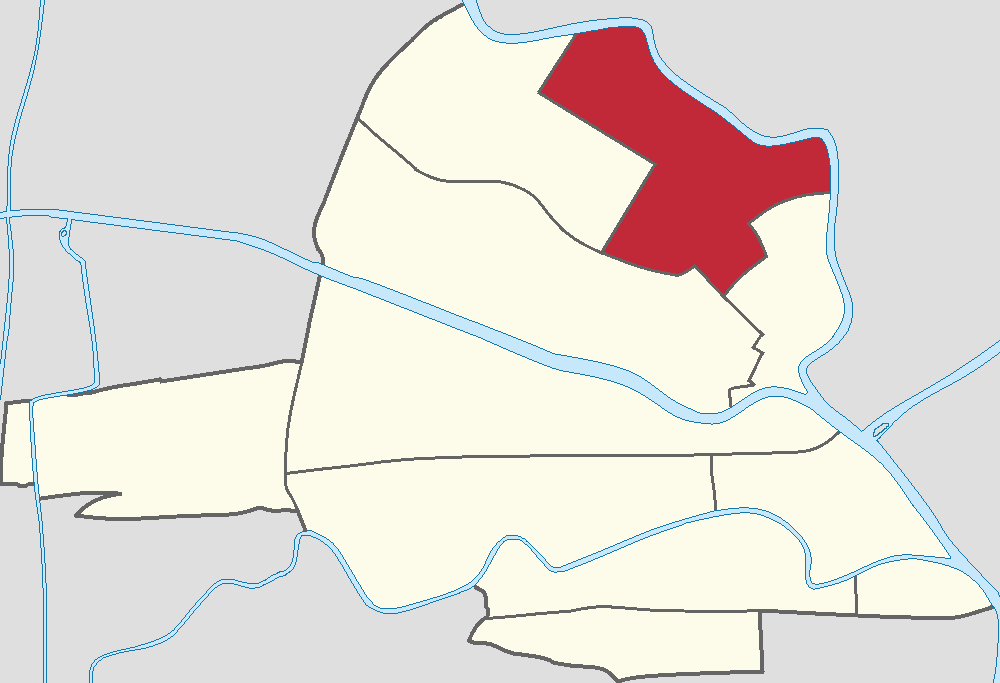
- Location in Hongqiao District

- Location within Tianjin Location within China
- Coordinates: 39°10′25″N 117°09′30″E
- Country: China
- Municipality: Tianjin
- District: Hongqiao
- Village-level Divisions: 14 communities

Area
  - Total: 2.48 km^{2} (0.96 sq mi)
- Elevation: 8 m (26 ft)

Population (2010)
  - Total: 98,652
  - Density: 39,800/km^{2} (103,000/sq mi)
- Time zone: UTC+8 (China Standard)
- Postal code: 300130
- Area code: 022

Dingzigu Subdistrict (Chinese: 丁字沽街道; pinyin: Dīngzìgū Jiēdào) is a subdistrict situated in the northern part of Hongqiao District, Tianjin, China. It borders Tianmu Town to its north, Xinkaihe Subdistrict to its east, Xigu and Xiyuzhuang Subdistricts to its south, and Xianyang North Road Subdistrict to its west. Its population was 98,652 as of 2010.

The subdistrict was formed in 1952. Its name Dingzigu comes from the fact that the section of the Grand Canal that passes through this region is shaped like a Chinese Character Ding (丁).

== Geography ==
Dingzigu subdistrict is situated on the south of Grand Canal.

== Administrative divisions ==
At the end of 2021, Dingzigu Subdistrict comprised 14 residential communities. They can be seen in the list below:

Subdivision names	Name transliterations
光采	Guangcai
风貌里	Fengmaoli
三段	Sanduan
六段	Liuduan
十段	Shiduan
勤俭桥	Qinjianqiao
桃花园	Taohuayuan
东大楼	Dongdalou
潞河园	Luheyuan
北平房	Beipingfang
胜灾	Shengzhai
十三段	Shisanduan
光荣道	Guangrongdao
南北大街	Nanbei Dajie

== See also ==
- List of township-level divisions of Tianjin
