= Jieyuan Subdistrict =

Jieyuan Subdistrict 芥园街道
- Subdistrict
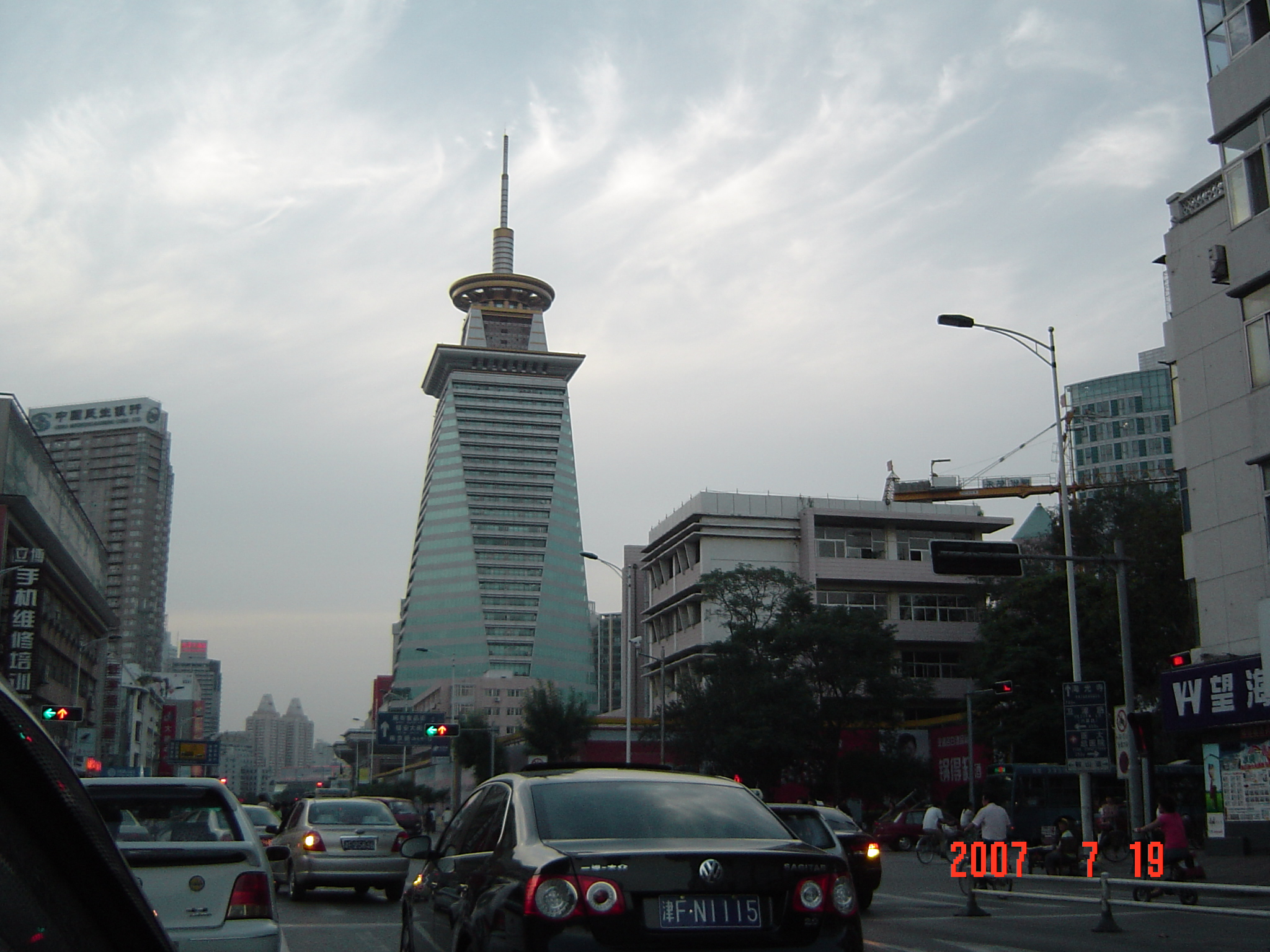
- Qingnian Road on the west of the subdistrict, 2007

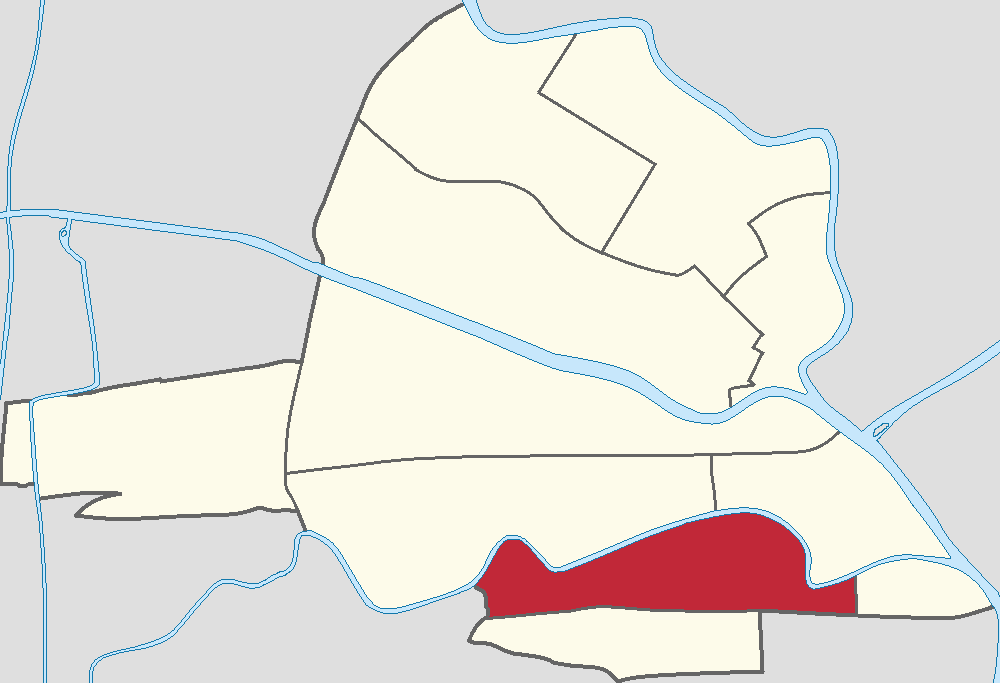
- Location of Jiyuan Subdistrict within Hongqiao District

- Location within Tianjin Location within China
- Coordinates: 39°08′40″N 117°08′22″E
- Country: China
- Municipality: Tianjin
- District: Hongqiao
- Village-level Divisions: 8 communities

Area
  - Total: 1.79 km^{2} (0.69 sq mi)
- Elevation: 7 m (23 ft)

Population (2010)
  - Total: 33,212
  - Density: 18,600/km^{2} (48,100/sq mi)
- Time zone: UTC+8 (China Standard)
- Postal code: 300121
- Area code: 022

Jieyuan Subdistrict (simplified Chinese: 芥园街道; traditional Chinese: 芥園街道; pinyin: Jièyuán Jiēdào) is a subdistrict situated on the south side of Hongqiao District, Tianjin, China. It borders Shaogongzhuang Subdistrict to the northwest, Santiaoshi Subdistrict to the northeast and east, Gulou and Lingdangge Subdistricts to the south, and Changhong Subdistrict to the west. In the year 2010, It had 33,212 people residing under its administration as of 2010.

During Qianlong Emperor's visit, the canola in this area were blooming. The region was given the name Jieyuan (Chinese: 芥园; lit. 'Canola Garden') as a result. The subdistrict was formally created in 1998.

== Geography ==
Jieyuan subdistrict is located along the southern bank of Nanyun River.

== Administrative divisions ==
In 2021, Jieyuan Subdistrict consisted of 8 residential communities. They are:

Subdivision names	Name transliterations
芥园大堤	Jieyuan Dadi
隆春里	Longchunli
弘丽园	Hongliyuan
水西园	Shuixiyuan
世春里	Shichunli
泉春里	Quanchunli
河滨花苑	Hebin Huayuan
河庭花苑	Heting Huayuan

== Gallery ==
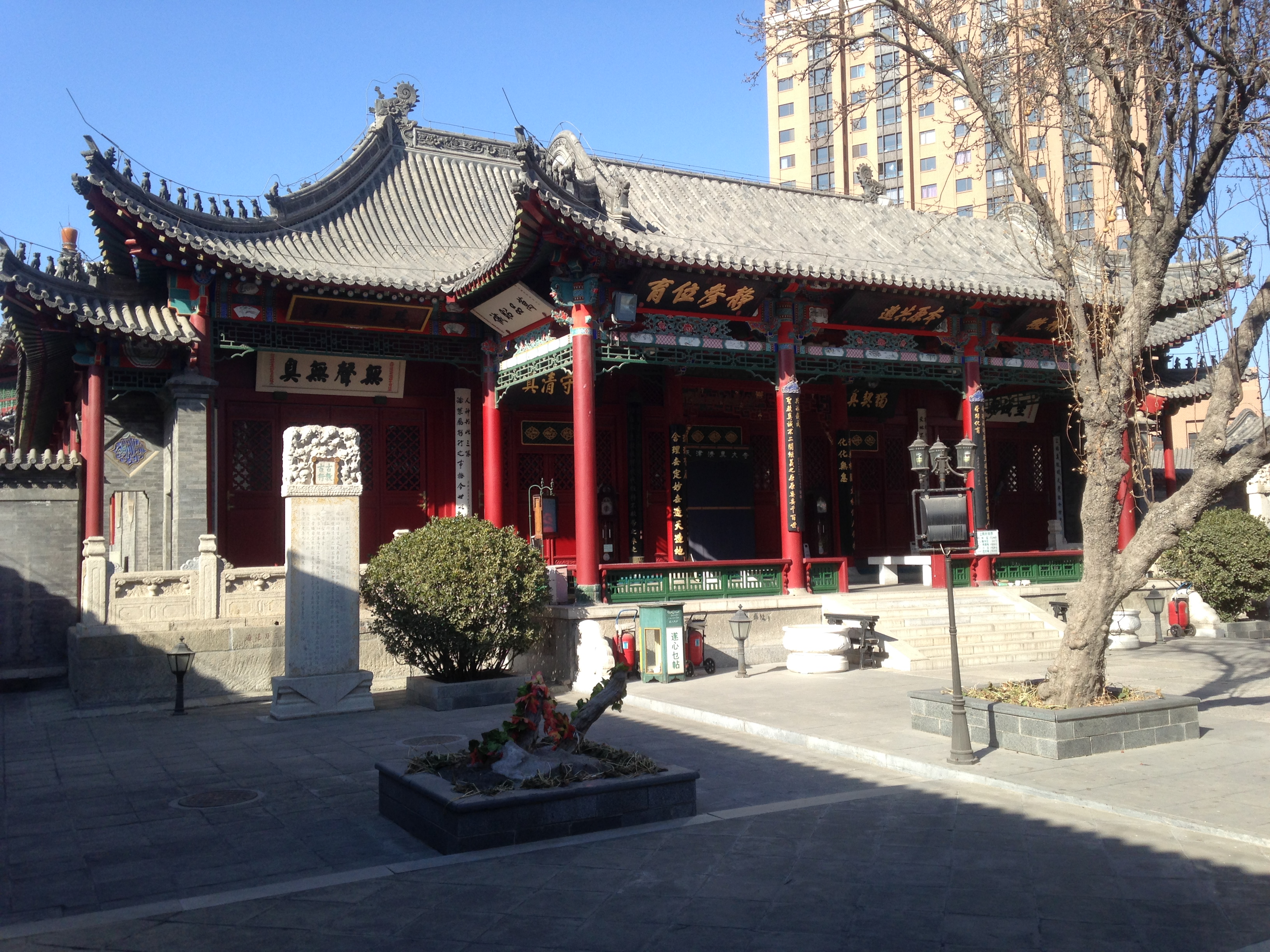
Tianjin Mosque within the subdistrict, 2014

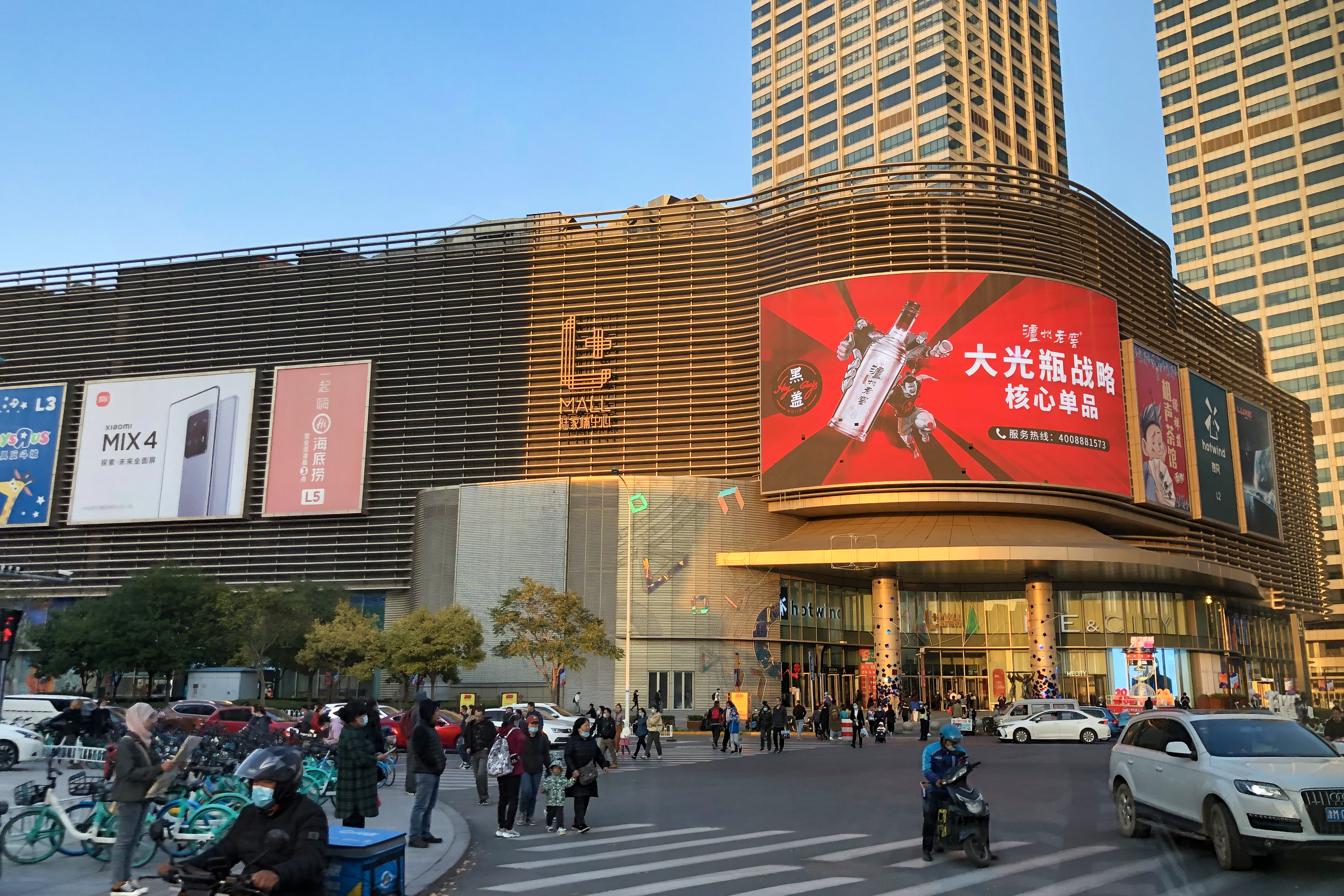
L+ Shopping Mall along Beima Road, 2021

== See also ==
- List of township-level divisions of Tianjin
