= Heyuan Subdistrict, Tianjin =

Heyuan Subdistrict 和苑街道
- Subdistrict
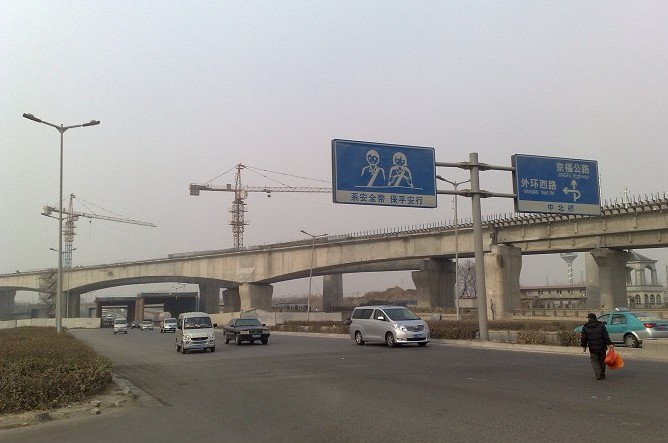
- Xiqing Road within the subdistrict, 2011

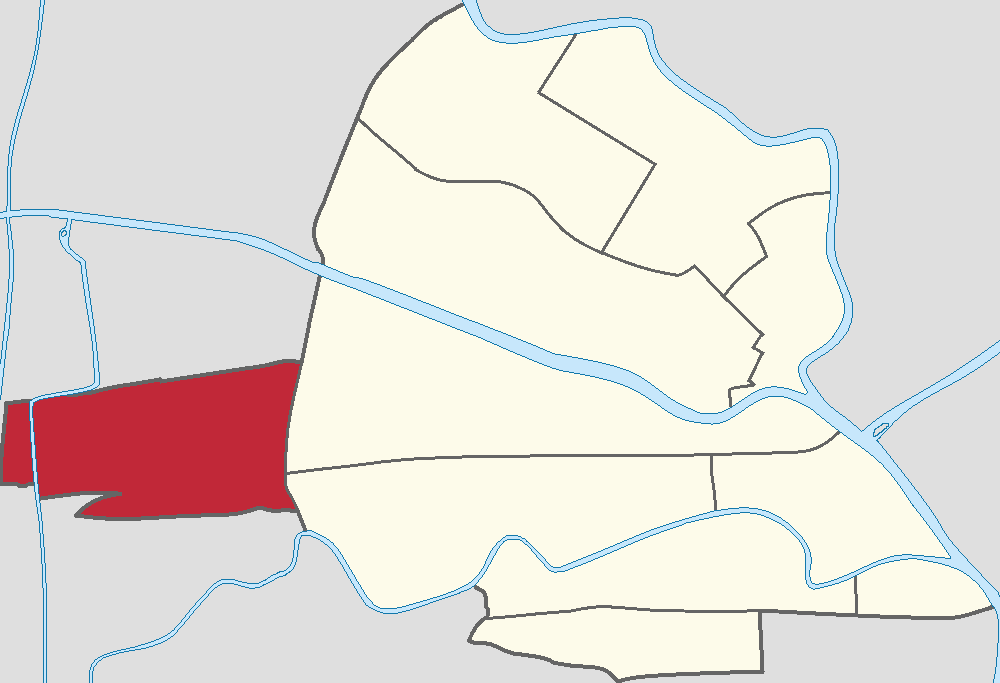
- Location in Hongqiao District

- Location within Tianjin Location within China
- Coordinates: 39°09′34″N 117°06′31″E
- Country: China
- Municipality: Tianjin
- District: Hongqiao
- Village-level Divisions: 7 communities
- Elevation: 6 m (20 ft)
- Time zone: UTC+8 (China Standard)
- Postal code: 300112
- Area code: 022

Heyuan Subdistrict (Chinese: 和苑街道; pinyin: Héyuàn Jiēdào) is a subdistrict in western Hongqiao District, Tianjin, China. It borders Xiyingmen SUbdistrict to its north and south, Xigu and Shaogongzhuang Subdistricts to its east, Zhongbei Town to its southwest, and Yangliuqing Town to its west.

The subdistrict was created in 2015. The subdistrict's name can be literally translated as "Peace Garden".

== Administrative divisions ==
In 2021, Heyuan Subdistrict consisted of 7 residential communities, all of which can be seen in the list below:

Subdivision names	Name transliterations
全和园	Quanheyuan
梦和园	Mengheyuan
康和园	Kangheyuan
营和园	Yingheyuan
和苑家园	Heyuan Jiayuan
名景家园	Mingjing Jiayuan
民康园	Minkangyuan

== See also ==
- List of township-level divisions of Tianjin
