= Xiyuzhuang Subdistrict =

Xiyuzhuang Subdistrict 西于庄街道
- Subdistrict
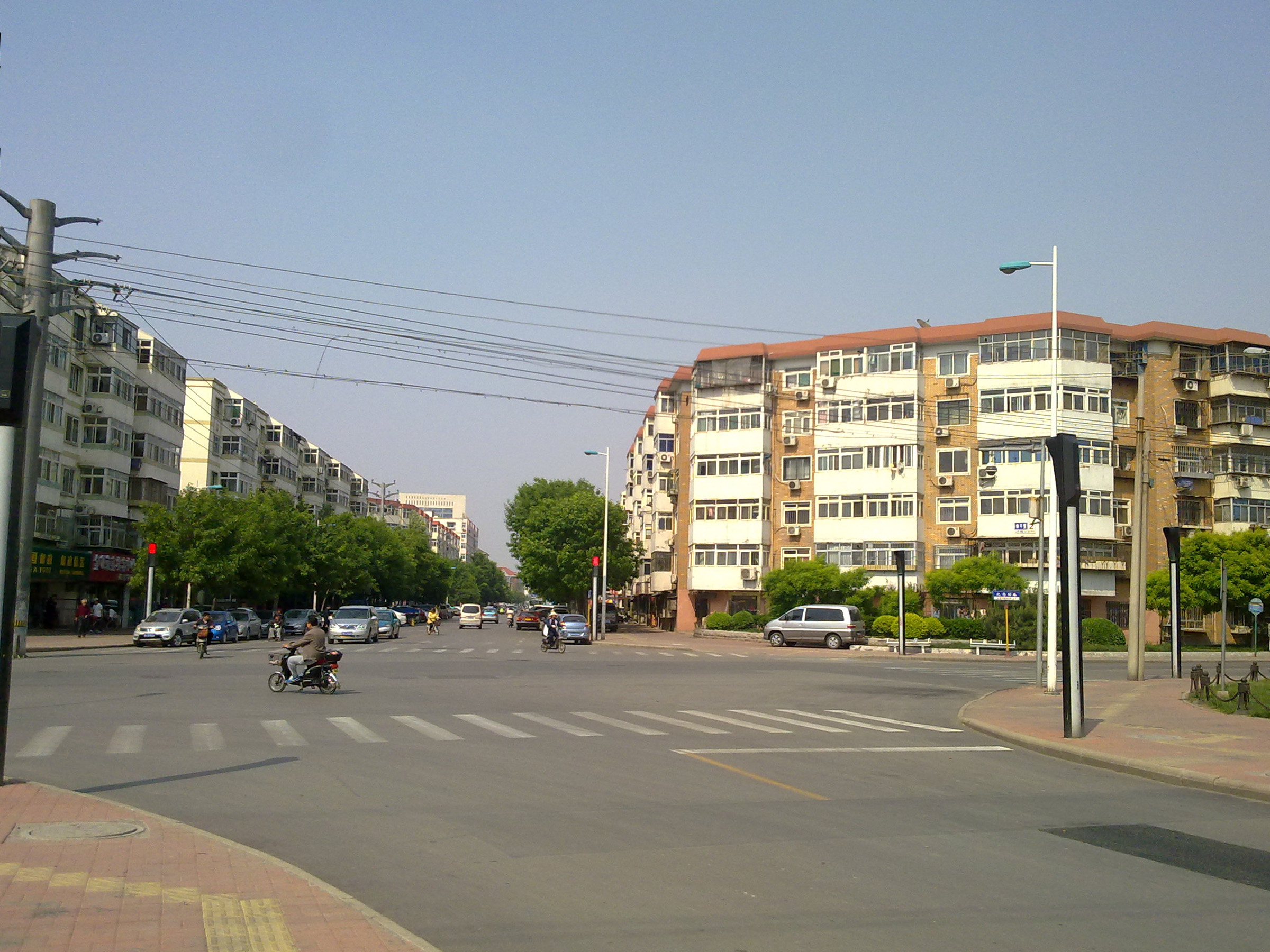
- Jipingli Residential Community within the subdistrict, 2014

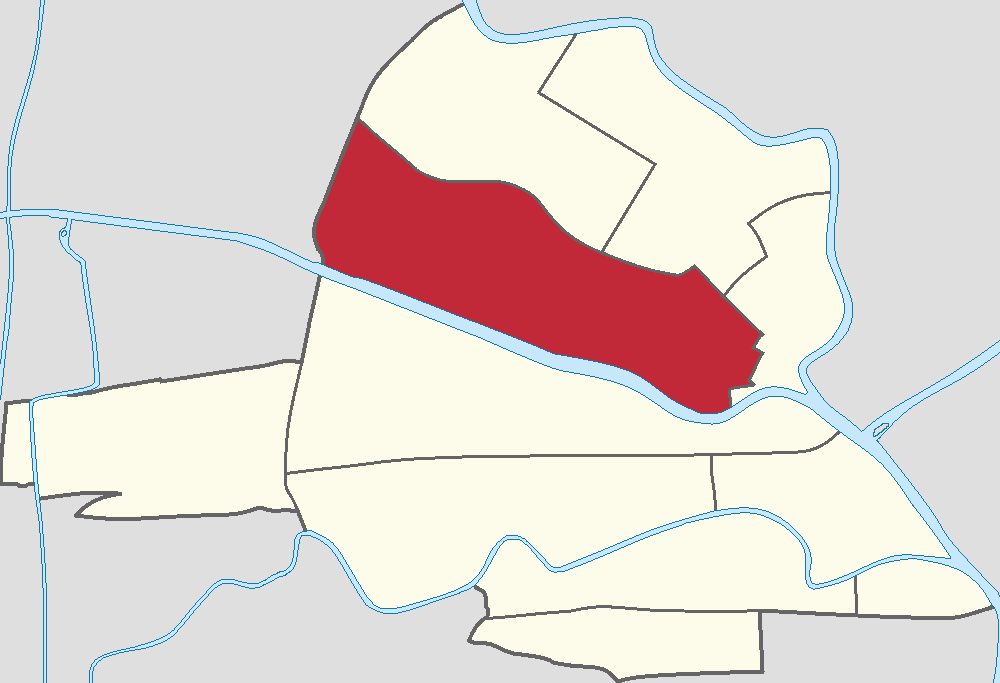
- Location within Hongqiao District

- Location within Tianjin Location within China
- Coordinates: 39°09′55″N 117°09′29″E
- Country: China
- Municipality: Tianjin
- District: Hongqiao
- Village-level Divisions: 16 communities

Area
  - Total: 3.94 km^{2} (1.52 sq mi)
- Elevation: 7 m (23 ft)

Population (2010)
  - Total: 80,888
  - Density: 20,500/km^{2} (53,200/sq mi)
- Time zone: UTC+8 (China Standard)
- Postal code: 300133
- Area code: 022

Xiyuzhuang Subdistrict (simplified Chinese: 西于庄街道; traditional Chinese: 西于莊街道; pinyin: Xīyúzhuāng Jiēdào) is a subdistrict located in the center of Hongqiao District, Tianjin, China. It shares border with Xianyang North Road and Dingzigu Subdistricts in the north, Xigu Subdistrict in the east and south, and Tianmu Town in the west. It had 80,888 people residing under its administration as of 2010.

The subdistrict was named after Xiyuzhuang Village (Chinese: 西于庄; lit. 'West Yu Village') that preceded the residential communities here.

== Geography ==
Xiyuzhuang subdistrict is located on the north of Ziya River.

== History ==
History of Xiyuzhuang Subdistrict
Year	Status	Part of
1949 - 1952	Xiyuazhuang Street	9th District, Tianjin
1952 - 1956	Xiyuazhuang Street	8th District, Tianjin
1956 - 1958	Xiyuazhuang Street	Hongqiao District, Tianjin
1958 - 1960	Within Xigu Subdistrict	Hongqiao District, Tianjin
1960 - 1962	Within Xigu People's Commune	Hongqiao District, Tianjin
1962 - 1966	Xiyuzhuang Subdistrict	Hongqiao District, Tianjin
1966 - 1968	Xiyuzhuang Subdistrict	Hongwei District, Tianjin
1968–present	Xiyuzhuang Subdistrict	Hongwei District, Tianjin

== Administrative divisions ==
As of the year 2021, Xiyuzhuang Subdistrict oversaw 16 residential communities. They are listed as follows:

Subdivision names	Name transliterations
增产里	Zengchanli
新建里	Xinjianli
西于庄	Xiyuzhuang
礼貌楼	Limaolou
祥居	Xiangju
集安里	Ji'anli
植物园	Zhiwuyuan
敦煌楼	Dunhuanglou
子牙里第一	Ziyali Diyi
子牙里第三	Ziyali Di'er
永光楼	Yongguanglou
怡水苑	Yishuiyuan
翠溪园	Cuixiyuan
绮水苑	Qishuiyuan
亿城堂庭	Yicheng Tangting
美居	Meiju

== Transport ==
- Tongchengshangwuquxiyuzhuang station, Line 4 (North Section), Tianjin Metro

== Gallery ==
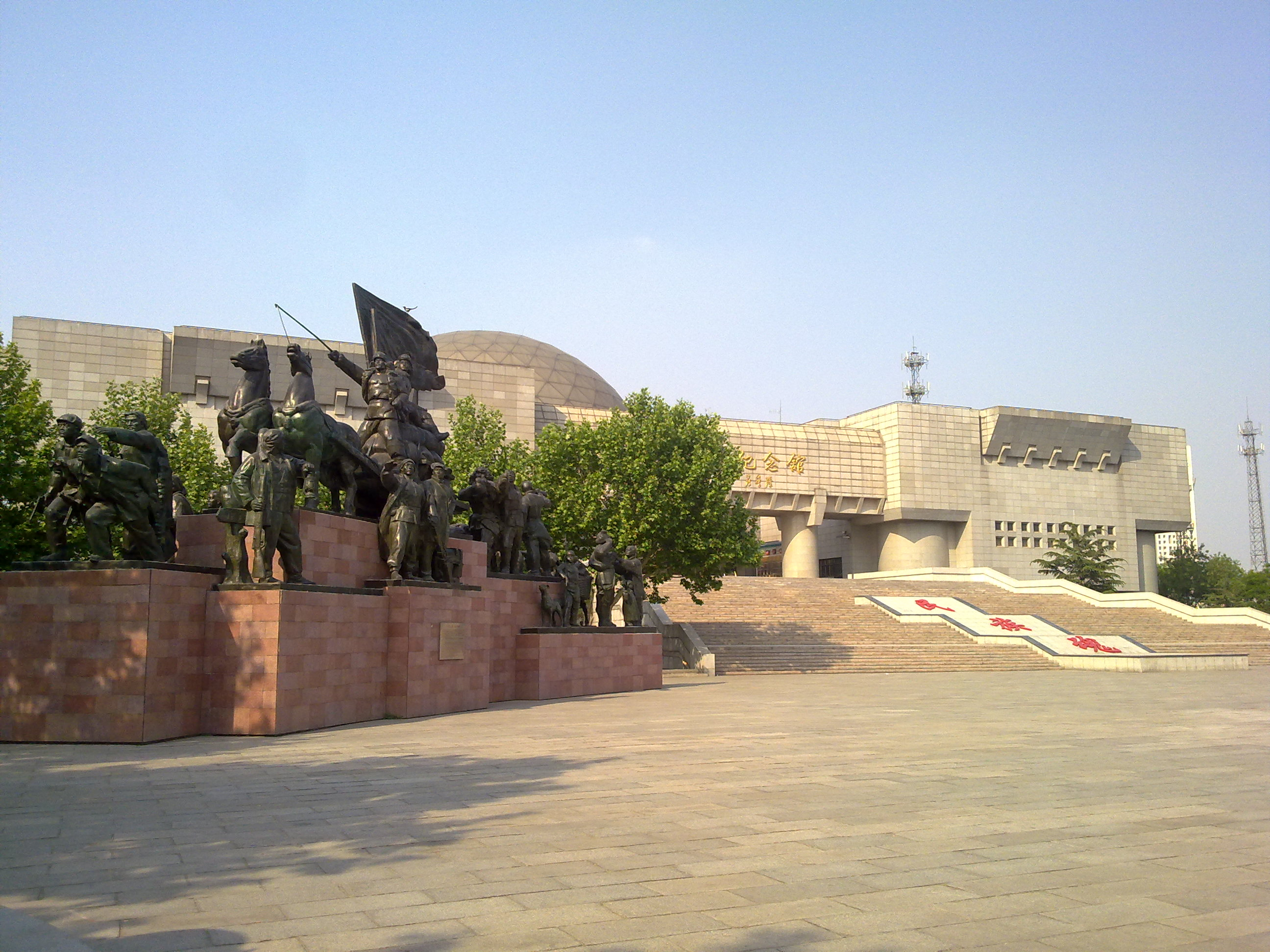
Memorial of Pingjin campaign within the subdistrict, 2014

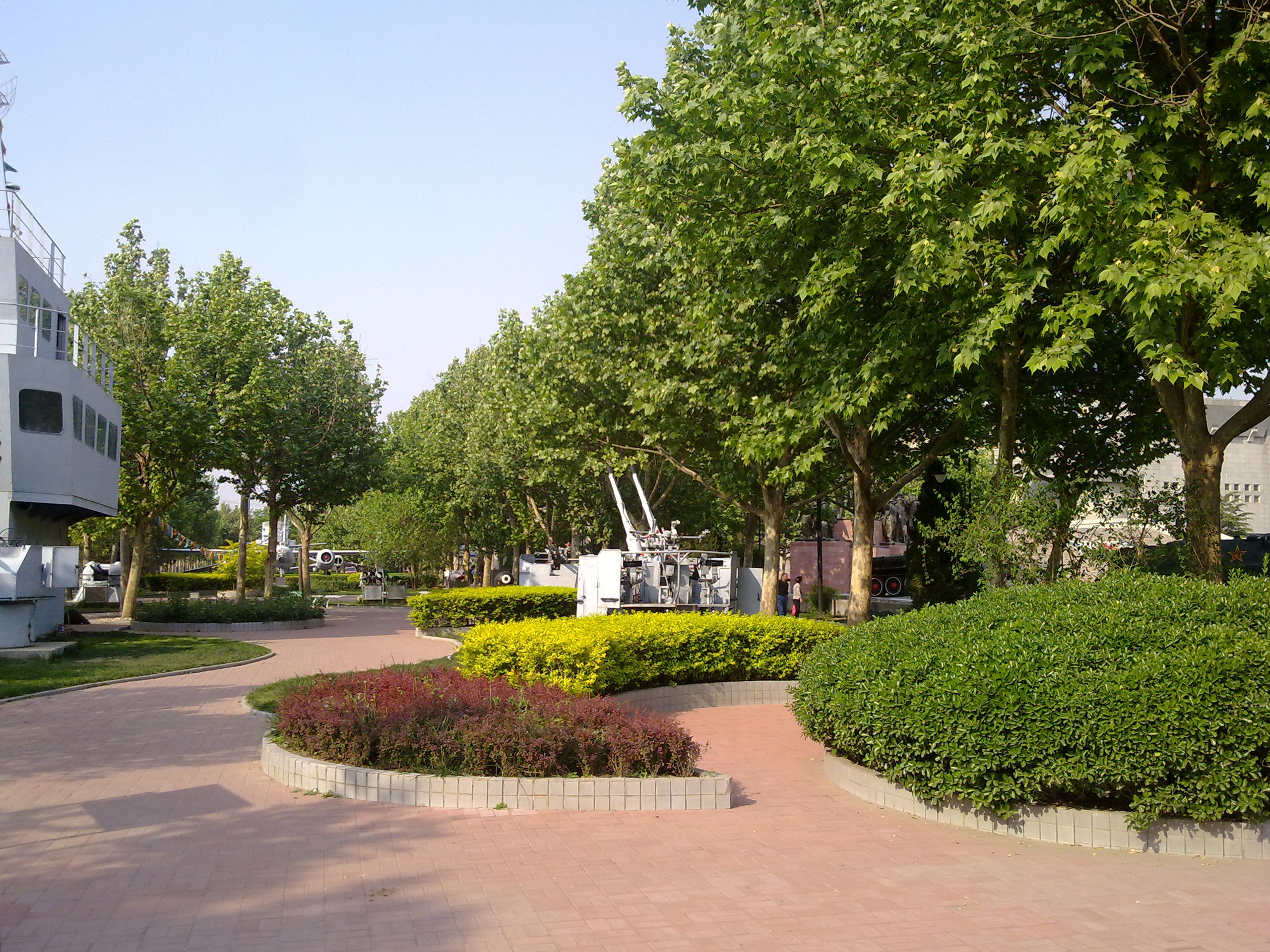
Junwei Park within the memorial, 2014

== See also ==
- List of township-level divisions of Tianjin
