= Xianyang North Road Subdistrict =

Xianyang North Road Subdistrict 咸阳北路街道
- Subdistrict
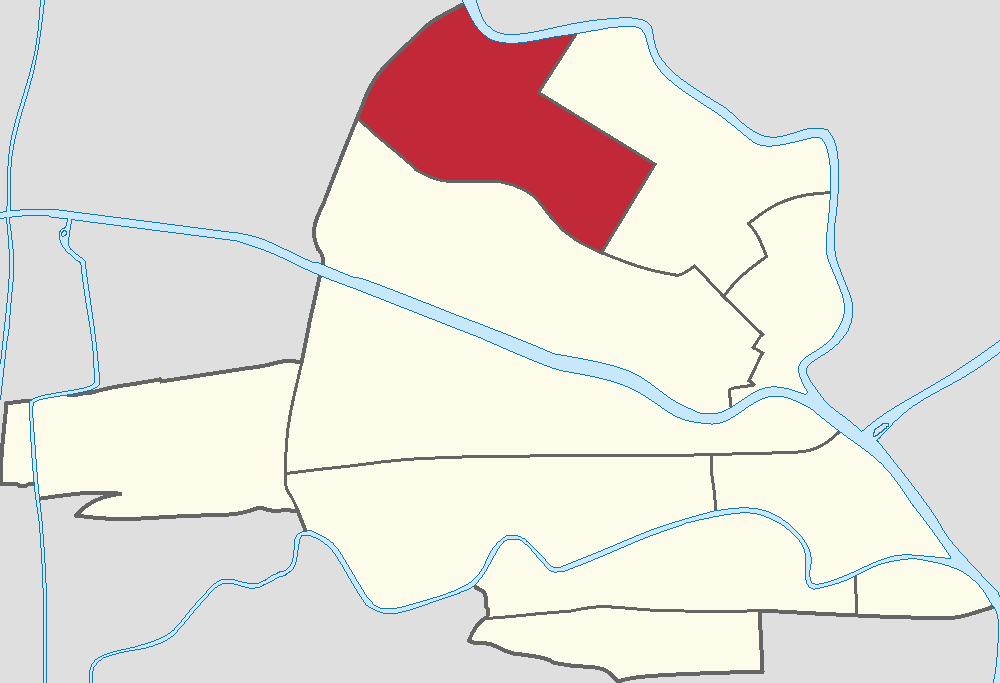
- Location within Hongqiao District

- Location within Tianjin Location within China
- Coordinates: 39°10′56″N 117°08′07″E
- Country: China
- Municipality: Tianjin
- District: Hongqiao
- Village-level Divisions: 16 communities

Area
  - Total: 2.44 km^{2} (0.94 sq mi)
- Elevation: 8 m (26 ft)

Population (2010)
  - Total: 74,799
  - Density: 30,700/km^{2} (79,400/sq mi)
- Time zone: UTC+8 (China Standard)
- Postal code: 300131
- Area code: 022

Xianyang North Road Subdistrict (simplified Chinese: 咸阳北路街道; traditional Chinese: 咸陽北路街道; pinyin: Xiányángběilù Jiēdào) is a subdistrict situated on northern Hongqiao District, Tianjin, China. It shares border with Tianmu Town to the north and west, Dingzigu Subdistrict to the east, and Xiyuzhuang Subdistrict to the south. It had 74,799 inhabitants as of 2010.

The subdistrict was established in 1980. Its name comes from Xianyang North Road that runs through the subdistrict.

== Geography ==
Xianyang North Road subdistrict is situated on the southern bank of the Grand Canal.

== Administrative divisions ==
By the end of 2021, Xianyang North Road Subdistrict had 16 residential communities. They are listed in the table below:

Subdivision names	Name transliterations
凤城楼	Fengchenglou
开源	Kaiyuan
永进	Yongjin
化工	Huagong
绥中	Suizhong
彰武	Zhangwu
七零七所	Qiling Qisuo
同心	Tongxin
宁城	Ningcheng
本溪	Benxi
永明里	Yongmingli
幸福	Xingfu
红旗	Hongqi
勤俭	Qinjian
团结	Tuanjie
北岸	Bei'an

== See also ==
- List of township-level divisions of Tianjin
