= Gao Lingwen =

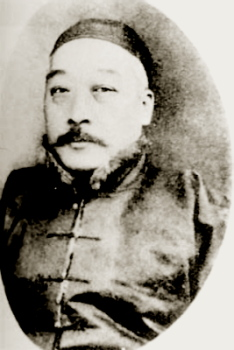

Gao Lingwen (1862–1945) was a scholar and writer from the city of Tianjin (Tientsin), China. He was the founder and principal of the first modern high school of Tianjin, the Bell Tower Middle School (铃铛阁中学), and the elder brother of China's acting President Gao Lingwei, of the Beiyang Government.

After the fall of Tianjin in 1900, Gao decided to create middle schools in Tianjin, to enlighten the general population and save them from the demise of ignorance. In 1901, he opened a private school at the Northwest Corner (西北角) of Tianjin, named the General School (普通学堂). He hired both Chinese and English-speaking teachers, and the school received about 100 students. In 1902, the General School was declared Tianjin's first public school, and changed its name to the Bell Tower Middle School. Afterwards, he also opened five elementary schools, and three lecturing houses. In 1906, rewarding him for his enormous efforts in his educational career, he was promoted to be the general manager of the Department of Education.

During 1915 to 1922, Gao was devoted to the documentation of Tianjin's history, writing The New Record of Tianjin County (天津县新志).
