= Hai River =

River in Tianjin, China

Coordinates: 38°57′N 117°43′E

Hai River Hai He
- Hai River in Tianjin

- Hai River basin
- The Hai River after the confluence of the Ziya River and the northern Grand Canal
- Native name: 海河 (Chinese)

Location
- Country: China
- State: Tianjin, Hebei, Beijing, Henan, Inner Mongolia, Shanxi, Shandong

Physical characteristics
- Source: Taihang Mountains, Yan Mountains
- Mouth: Bohai Sea
- Length: 1,329 km (826 mi)
- Basin size: 318,200 km^{2} (122,900 sq mi)
- Discharge
  - average: 717 m^{3}/s (25,300 cu ft/s)

Hai River
- Chinese: 海河
- Literal meaning: Sea River
Transcriptions
Standard Mandarin
- Hanyu Pinyin: Hǎi Hé

Peiho
- Chinese: 白河
- Literal meaning: White River
Transcriptions
Standard Mandarin
- Hanyu Pinyin: Bái Hé

The Hai River (海河, lit. "Sea River"), also known as the Peiho, Pei Ho ("White River"), or Hai Ho, is a Chinese river in Tianjin emptying into the Bohai Sea. Its drainage basin covers most of Hebei, Beijing, and Tianjin, as well as parts of Inner Mongolia, Shanxi, Henan, and Shandong.

The Hai River at is formed by the confluence of five watercourses: the Ziya River, Northern Canal, Southern Canal, Daqing River, and Yongding River. Both canals are part of the Grand Canal, the Northern Canal being the northern terminus of the Beijing-Hangzhou system connects with the Chaobai River, also called Bai He, at Tongzhou. It is the only waterway from the sea to the center of Beijing, therefore its names are sometimes used interchangeably. The Southern Canal is fed by the Wei River at Linqing. Via the Grand Canal, the Hai River is connected to the Yellow and Yangtze rivers.

The construction of the Grand Canal greatly altered the rivers of the Hai River basin. Previously, the Wei, Ziya, Yongding, and Bai Rivers flowed independently of each other into the sea. The Grand Canal cut through the lower reaches of these rivers and fused them into one outlet in the form of the current Hai River.

During the Song dynasty, the Hai River was considered the lower section of the Jie River (界河, lit. "Border River"). In the Jin and Yuan dynasties, it was named as Zhígū River (直沽河, lit. "Straight Gu River") and Dàgū River (大沽河, lit. “Great Gu River") respectively. The name Hai River first appeared towards the end of the Ming dynasty.

The Hai River is 1,329 kilometers (826 mi) long as measured from the longest tributary, or 70 kilometers (43 mi) from the confluence of the Ziya River and Northern Canal to its estuary. Its basin has an area of approximately 319,000 km^{2} (123,000 sq mi).

== History ==
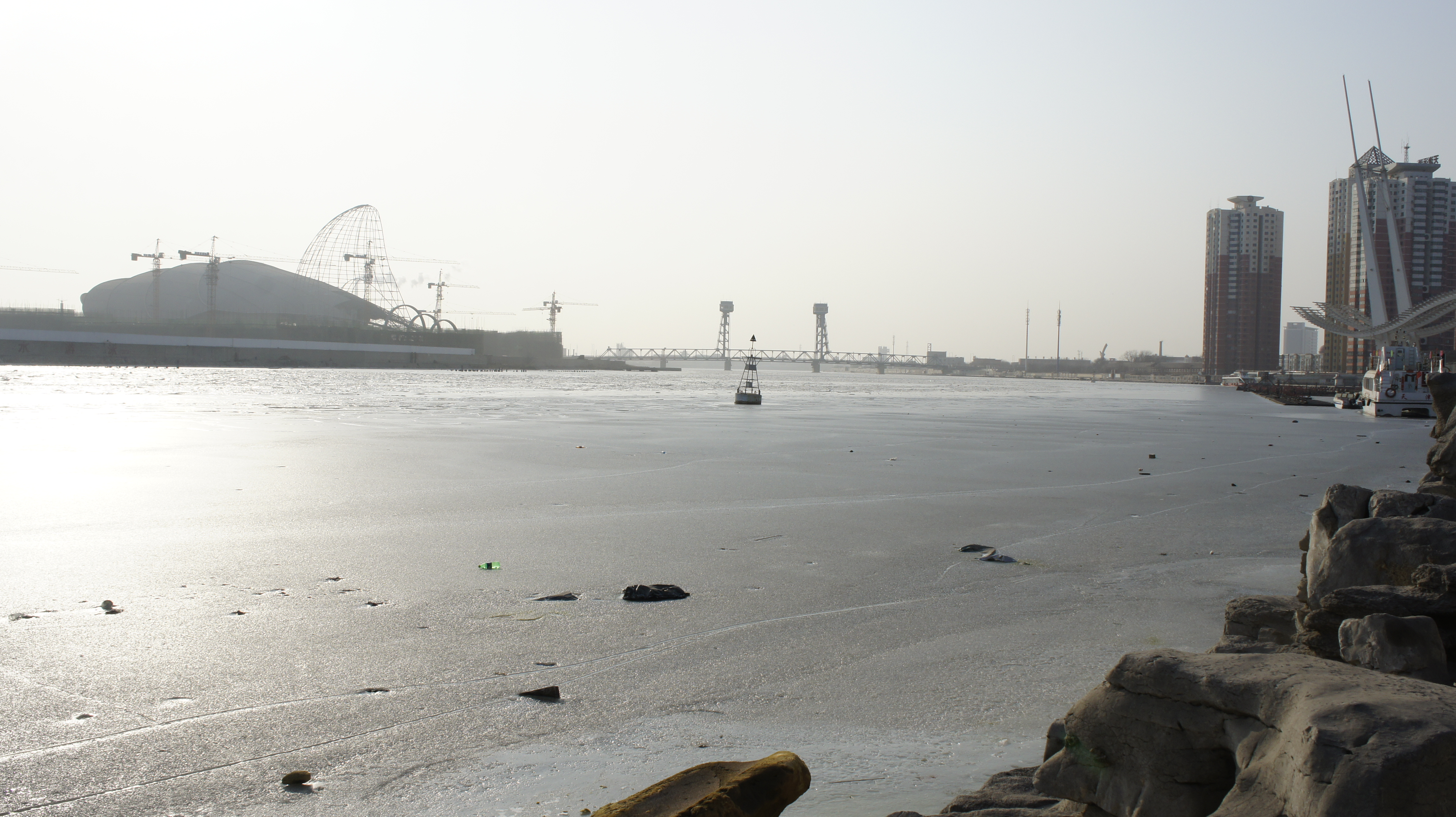
The Bund of the Hai River.

In June 1840, the river was used for negotiations between Qing Imperial Commissioner Qishan and British Plenipotentiary Charles Elliot in the First Opium War.

On 20 May 1858, the Pei-ho, as it was then known, was the scene of an invasion by Anglo-French forces during the Second Opium War whereby the Taku Forts were captured.

In 1863 seagoing ships could reach the head of navigation at Tongzhou, but the crooked river was difficult for large vessels. During the Boxer Rebellion, Imperial Chinese forces deployed a weapon called "electric mines" on June 15, at the Baihe river before the Battle of Taku Forts (1900), to prevent the western Eight-Nation Alliance from sending ships to attack. This was reported by American military intelligence in the United States. War Dept. by the United States. Adjutant-General's Office. Military Information Division.

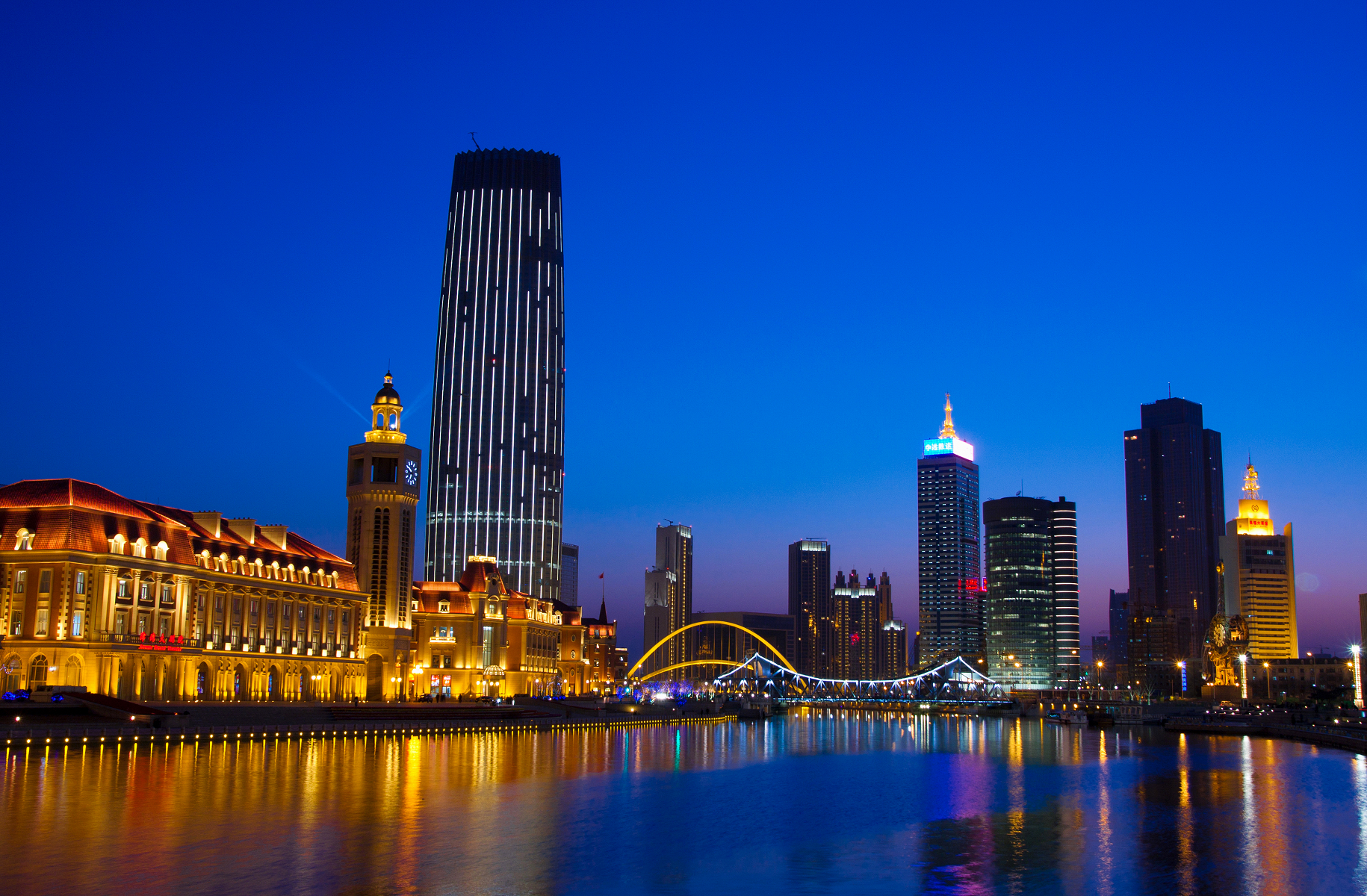
Hai River night

Like the Yellow River, the Hai is exceedingly muddy because of the powdery soil through which it flows. The silt carried by the water deposits in the lower reaches, sometimes causing flooding. The waters from the five major tributaries only have one shallow outlet to the sea, which makes such floods stronger. Because China's capital (and second largest city), Beijing, and the third largest city, Tianjin, both lie in the Hai He Basin, Hai He floods cause a significant loss. To alleviate flooding, reservoirs have been built and artificial channels dug to divert excess water directly into the sea. For example, the Chaobai River is diverted to the Chaobai Xin River and no longer joins with the Northern Canal.

Due to industrial and urban development in the Hai He Basin, the volume of water flow has greatly decreased. Many smaller tributaries and some of the major tributaries are dry for most of the year. With reduced water flow, water pollution worsens. The water shortage in the Hai He basin is expected to be alleviated by the South-North Water Transfer Project.

== See also ==
- Geography of China
- Taku (Peiho) Forts

== Bibliography ==
- This article incorporates text from Publication, Issue 33 Document (United States. War Dept.), by United States. Adjutant-General's Office. Military Information Division, a publication from 1901, now in the public domain in the United States.
- This article incorporates text from Reports on military operations in South Africa and China. July, 1901, by United States. Adjutant-General's Office. Military Information Division, Stephen L'H. Slocum, Carl Reichmann, Adna Romanga Chaffee, a publication from 1901, now in the public domain in the United States.
- This article incorporates text from Reports on military operations in South Africa and China, by Stephan L'H. Slocum, Carl Reichmann, Adna Romanza Chaffee, United States. Adjutant-General's Office. Military Information Division, a publication from 1901, now in the public domain in the United States.
