= Ziya River =

Coordinates: 38.223339°N 116.083741°E

Ziya River Ziya He
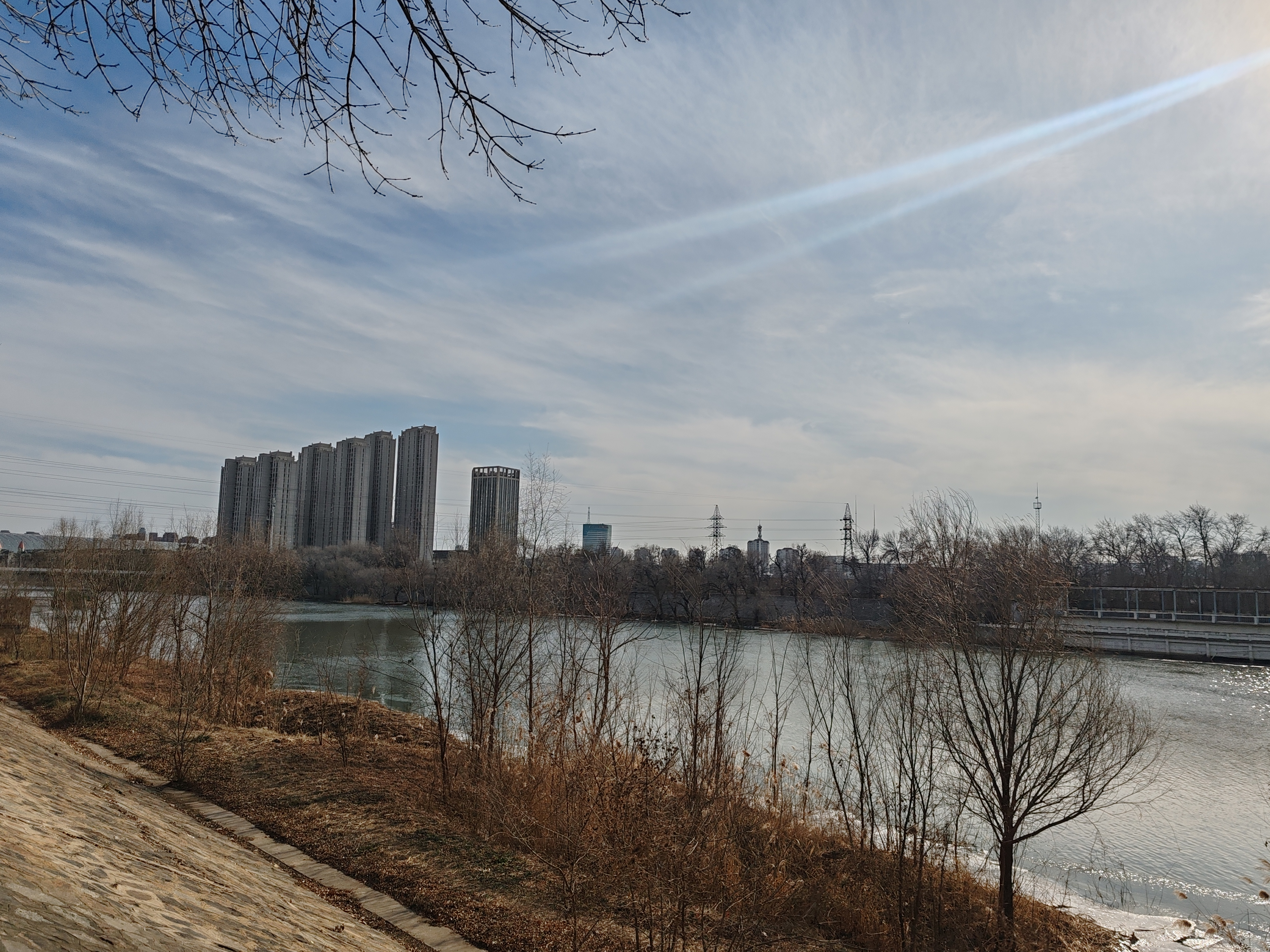
- Ziya River in Tianjin

- Ziya River in Hai River basin

- Location within China
- Native name: 子牙河

Location
- Country: China
- State: Shanxi, Hebei, Tianjin

Physical characteristics
- Source: Wutai Mountains
- Mouth: Hai River and Bohai Sea
- Length: 730 km (450 mi)
- Basin size: 78,700 km^{2} (30,400 sq mi)
- Discharge
  - average: 1 m^{3}/s (35 cu ft/s)

Ziya River
- Chinese: 子牙河
- Literal meaning: Ziya River
Transcriptions
Standard Mandarin
- Hanyu Pinyin: Zǐyáhé
- Wade–Giles: Tzu-ya Ho

The Ziya River is one of five major tributaries in the Hai River system of northern China. The total length of the Ziya River is 730 km (450 mi), its drainage basin covers 78,700 square kilometers (30,400 sq mi). The discharge rate of the Ziya River is about 1 cubic metre (35 cu ft) per second.

The Ziya River flows from Mount Wutai until it reaches the Hai River in Xian County, Hebei. Notable tributaries of the Ziya include the Ming, Hutuo, Fuyang, and Qingshui rivers. It shares a channel with the Hai River near the Southern Canal. A new artificial channel was constructed to connect it to the Bohai Sea near Tianjin under the name New Ziya River.
