= Changhong Subdistrict, Tianjin =

Changhong Subdistrict 长虹街道
- Subdistrict
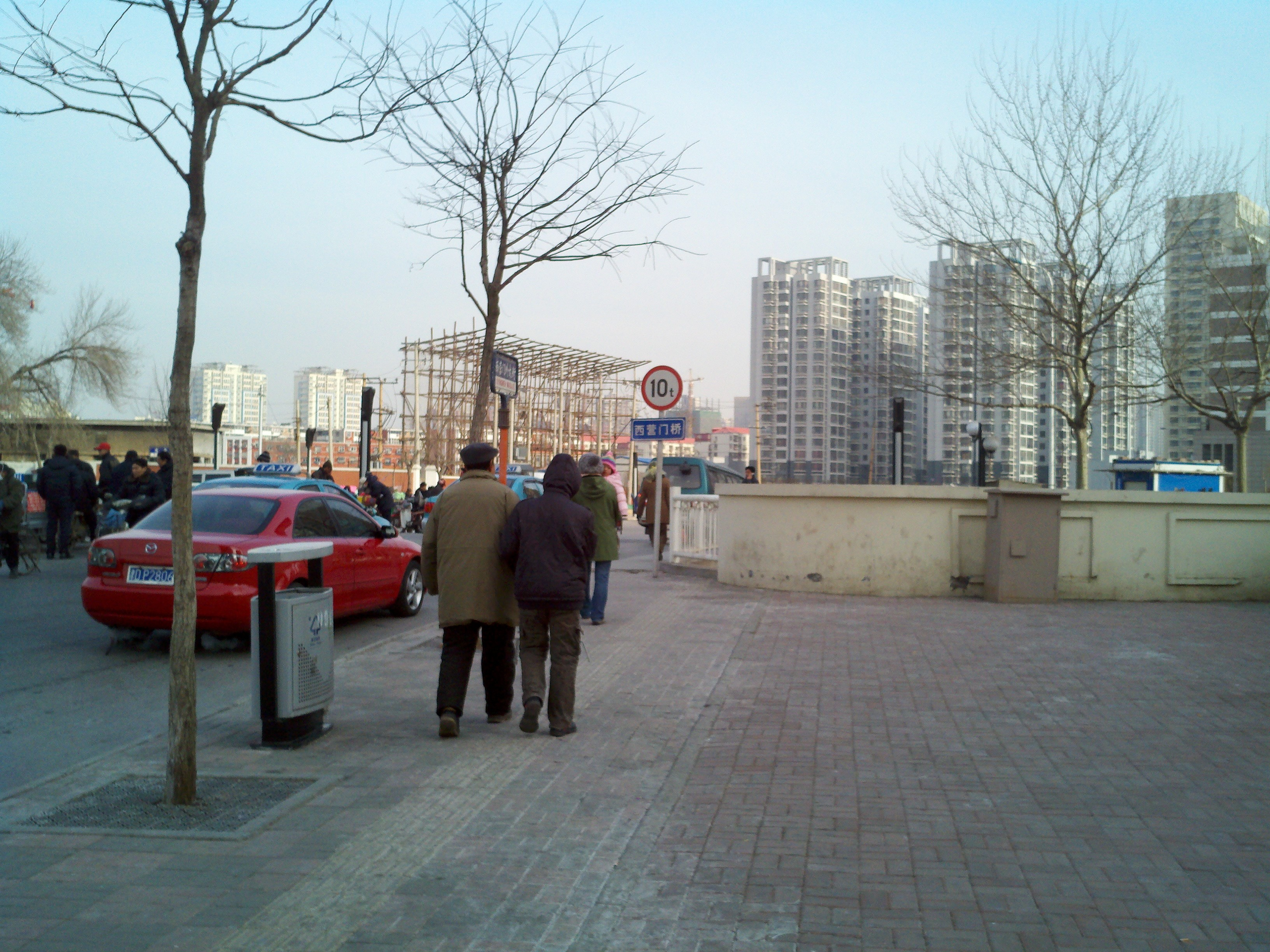
- Xiyingmen Bridge on the east of the subdistrict, 2011

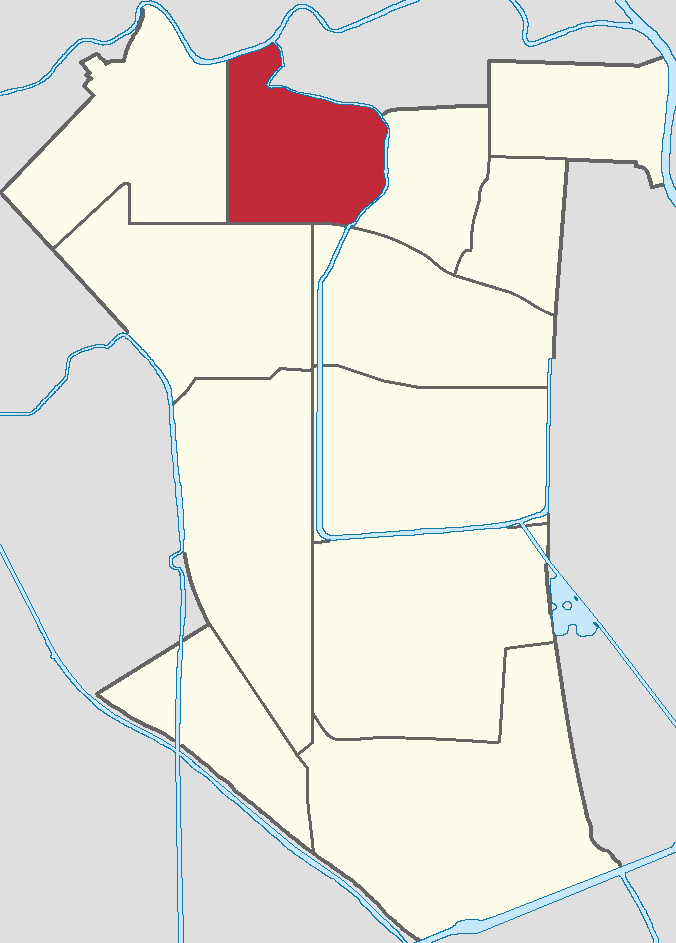
- Location in Nankai District

- Location within Tianjin Location within China
- Coordinates: 39°08′13″N 117°08′36″E
- Country: China
- Municipality: Tianjin
- District: Nankai
- Village-level Divisions: 13 communities

Area
  - Total: 2.63 km^{2} (1.02 sq mi)
- Elevation: 6 m (20 ft)

Population (2010)
  - Total: 73,346
  - Density: 27,900/km^{2} (72,200/sq mi)
- Time zone: UTC+8 (China Standard)
- Postal code: 300110
- Area code: 022

Changhong Subdistrict (simplified Chinese: 长虹街道; traditional Chinese: 長虹街道; pinyin: Chánghóng Jiēdào) is a subdistrict located within Nankai District, Tianjin, China. It borders Shaogongzhuang and Jieyuan Subdistricts to the north, Lingdangge and Guangkai Subdistricts to the east, Wanxing and Jialing Street Subdistricts to the south, and Xiangyang Road Subdistrict to the west. Its total population was 73,346 as of 2010.

The name Changhong (Chinese: 长虹; lit. 'Long Rainbow') is taken from Changhong Park that is located on the southeastern section of the subdistrict.

== Geography ==
Changhong subdistrict is on the southern bank of Nanyun River and western bank of Jin River.

== History ==
Timeline of Changhong Subdistrict
Year	Status	Part of
1958 - 1960	Dongshengli Subdistrict	Nankai District, Tianjin
1960 - 1962	Dongshengli People's Commune	Nankai District, Tianjin
1962 - 1966	Dongshengli Subdistrict Xiyingmenwai Subdistrict	Nankai District, Tianjin
1966 - 1968	Dongshengli Subdistrict Xiyingmenwai Subdistrict	Dongfanghong District, Tianjin
1968 - 1978	Dongshengli Subdistrict	Nankai District, Tianjin
1978 - 1999	Dongshengli Subdistrict Xiyingmenwai Subdistrict	Nankai District, Tianjin
1999–present	Changhong Subdistrict	Nankai District, Tianjin

== Administrative divisions ==
So far in 2021, Changhong Subdistrict composes of 13 residential communities, all of which are listed below:

Subdivision names	Name transliterations
光明路	Guangminglu
雅云里	Yayunli
翰园里	Hanyuanli
雅美里	Yameili
建华里	Jianhuali
平陆东里	Pinglu Dongli
东王台	Dongwangtai
幸福南里	Xingfu Nanli
广灵里	Guanglingli
华美里	Huameili
天香水畔	Tianxiang Shuipan
雅园里	Yayuanli
盛达园	Shengdali

== Gallery ==
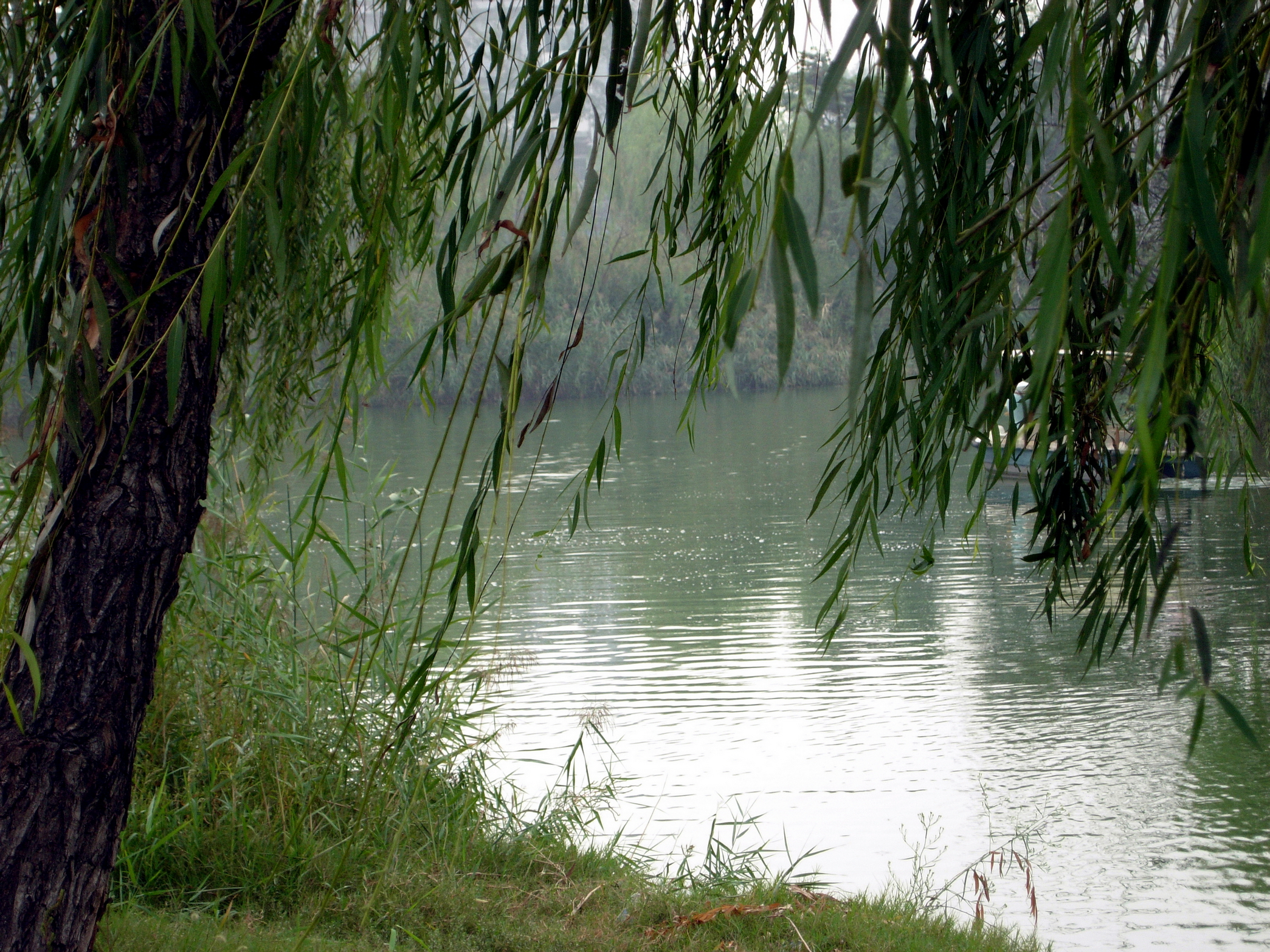
Lake within Changhong Park, 2007

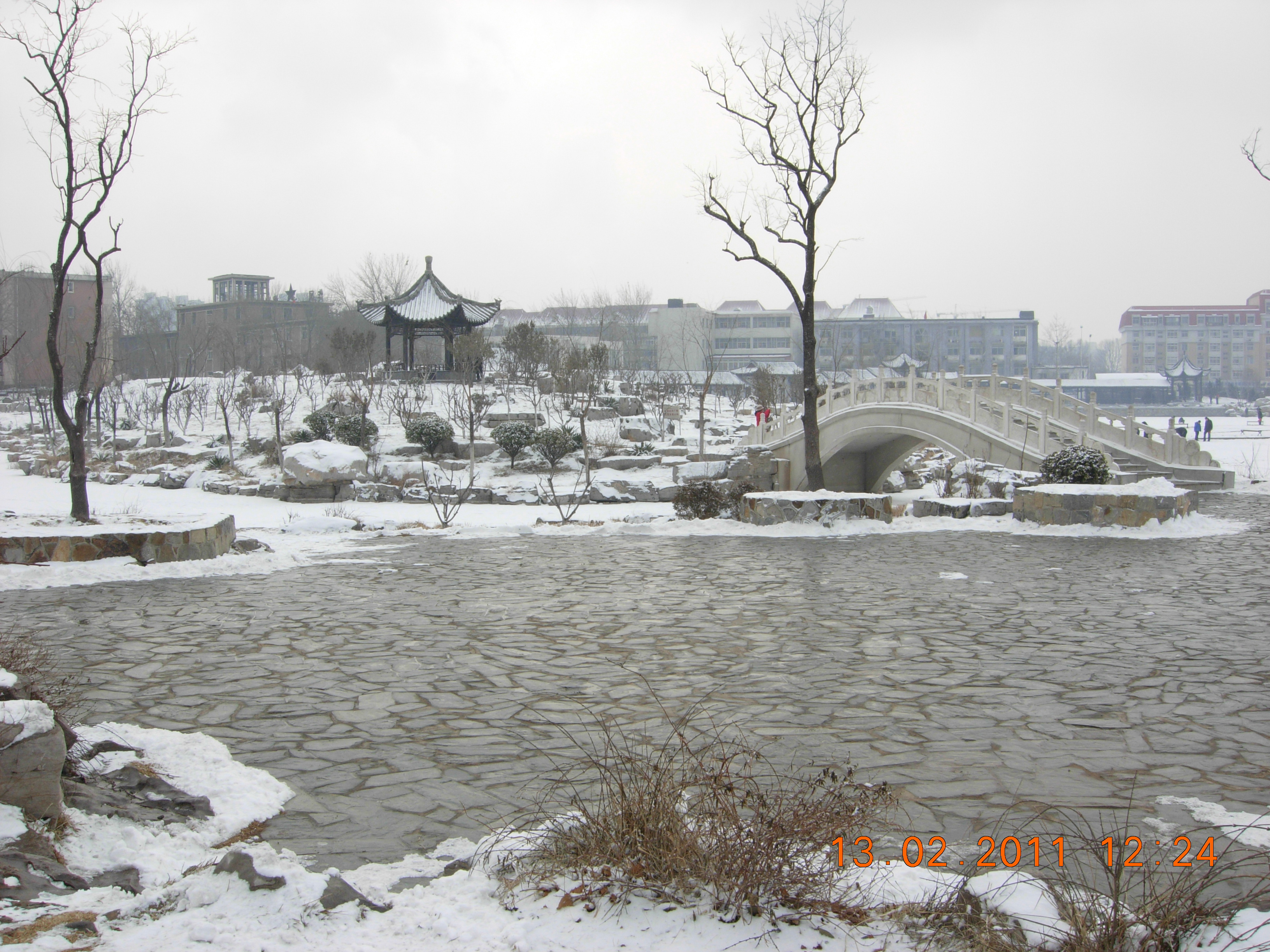
Changhong Park in the winter, 2011

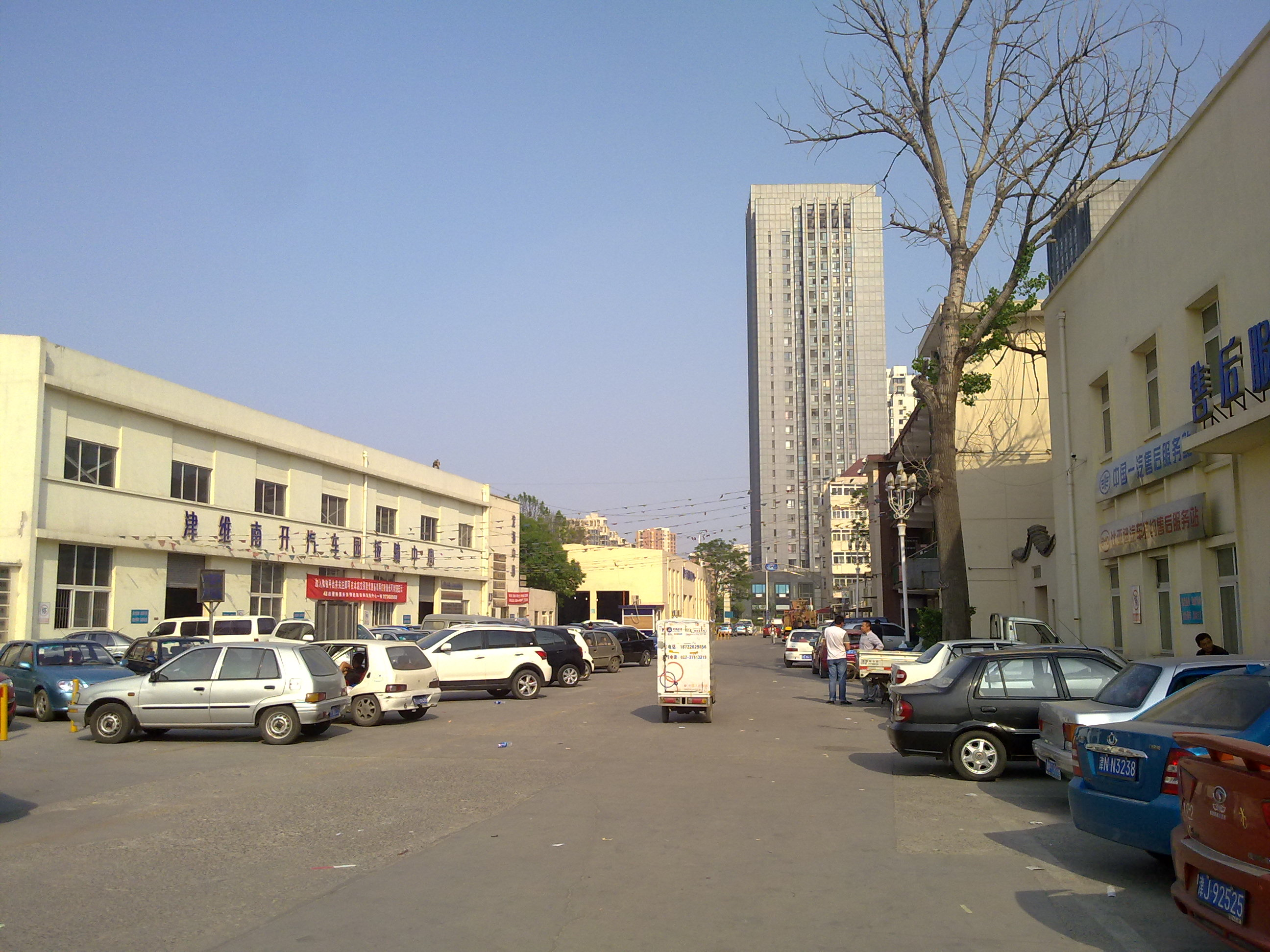
Street view near Fenshui Avenue, 2014

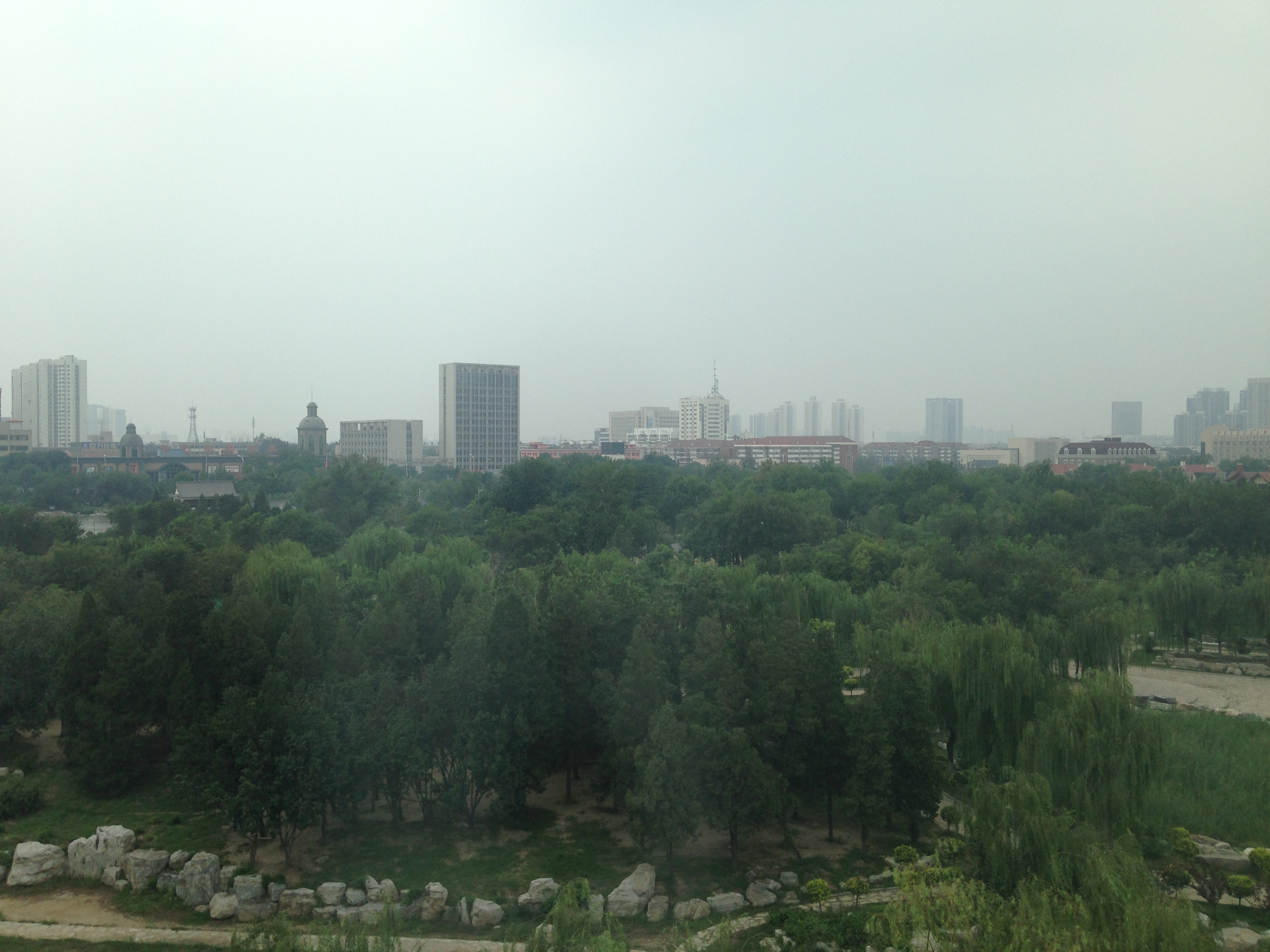
Aerial view of the Changhong Park, 2016
