= Tiyuzhongxin Subdistrict =

Tiyuzhongxin Subdistrict 体育中心街道
- Subdistrict
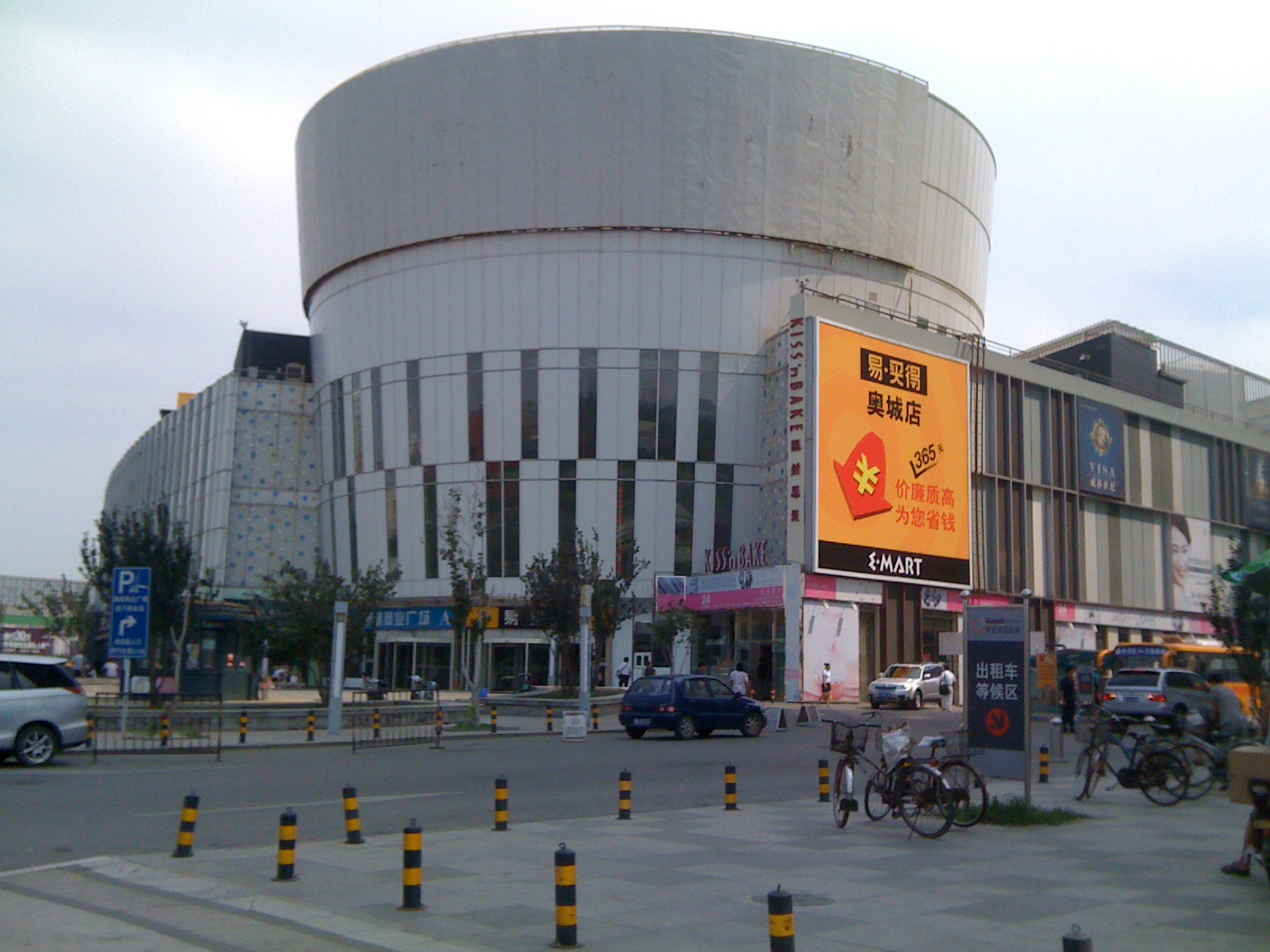
- E-Mart within the subdistrict, 2010

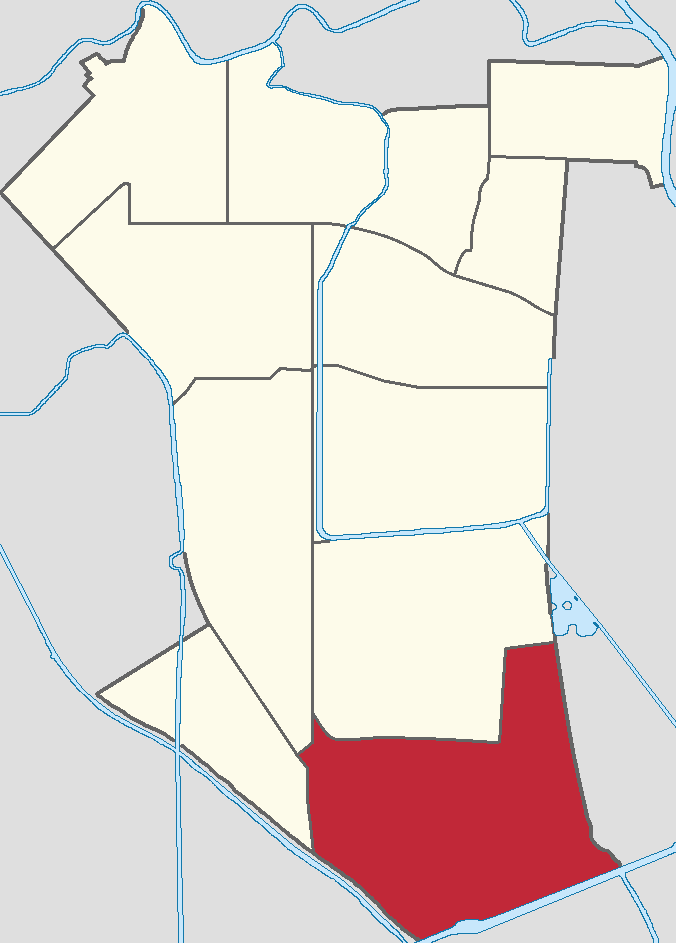
- Location in Nankai District

- Location within Tianjin Location within China
- Coordinates: 39°04′01″N 117°10′17″E
- Country: China
- Municipality: Tianjin
- District: Nankai
- Village-level Divisions: 12 communities

Area
  - Total: 5.84 km^{2} (2.25 sq mi)
- Elevation: 6 m (20 ft)

Population (2010)
  - Total: 66,948
  - Density: 11,500/km^{2} (29,700/sq mi)
- Time zone: UTC+8 (China Standard)
- Postal code: 300110
- Area code: 022

Tiyuzhongxin Subdistrict (simplified Chinese: 体育中心街道; traditional Chinese: 體育中心街道; pinyin: Tǐyùzhōngxīn Jiēdào) is a subdistrict in southern Nankai District, Tianjin, China. It shares border with Wangdingdi and Shuishanggongyuan Subdistricts in its north, Tianta Subdistrict in its east, Jiqizhuang Subdistrict in its south, and Huayuan Subdistrict in its west. It was home to 66,948 as of 2010.

The name Tiyuzhongxin (Chinese: 体育中心; lit. 'Sports Center') refers to the Tianjin Olympic Sports Center Park located on the southeast of the subdistrict.

== Geography ==
Tiyuzhongxin subdistrict borders Sihua River in its southeast. Sections of Tianjin–Pukou railway traverses through the south of the subdistrict.

== History ==
History of Tiyuzhongxin Subdistrict
Year	Status	Belong to
1952 - 1958		Xijiao District, Tianjin
1958 - 1962	Part of Dongfeng People's Commune	Nankai District, Tianjin
1962 - 1984	Part of Dongfeng People's Commune	Xijiao District, Tianjin
1984 - 1986	Part of Balitai Subdistrict	Nankai District, Tianjin
1986 - 1999	Lingzhuangzi Subdistrict	Nankai District, Tianjin
1999–present	Tiyuzhongxin Subdistrict	Nankai District, Tianjin

== Administrative divisions ==
At the time of writing, Tiyuzhongxin Subdistrict has 12 residential communities. They are:

Subdivision names	Name transliterations
宁乐里	Ningleli
金谷园	Jinguyuan
凌研里	Lingyanli
星城	Xingcheng
龙滨园	Longbinyuan
金禧园	Jinxiyuan
仁爱濠景	Renai Haojing
宁发阳光	Ningfa Yangguang
时代奥城	Shidai Aocheng
阳光壹佰国际新城	Yangguang Yibai Guoji Xincheng
俊城浅水湾	Juncheng Qianshuiwan
凌奥	Ling'ao

== Gallery ==
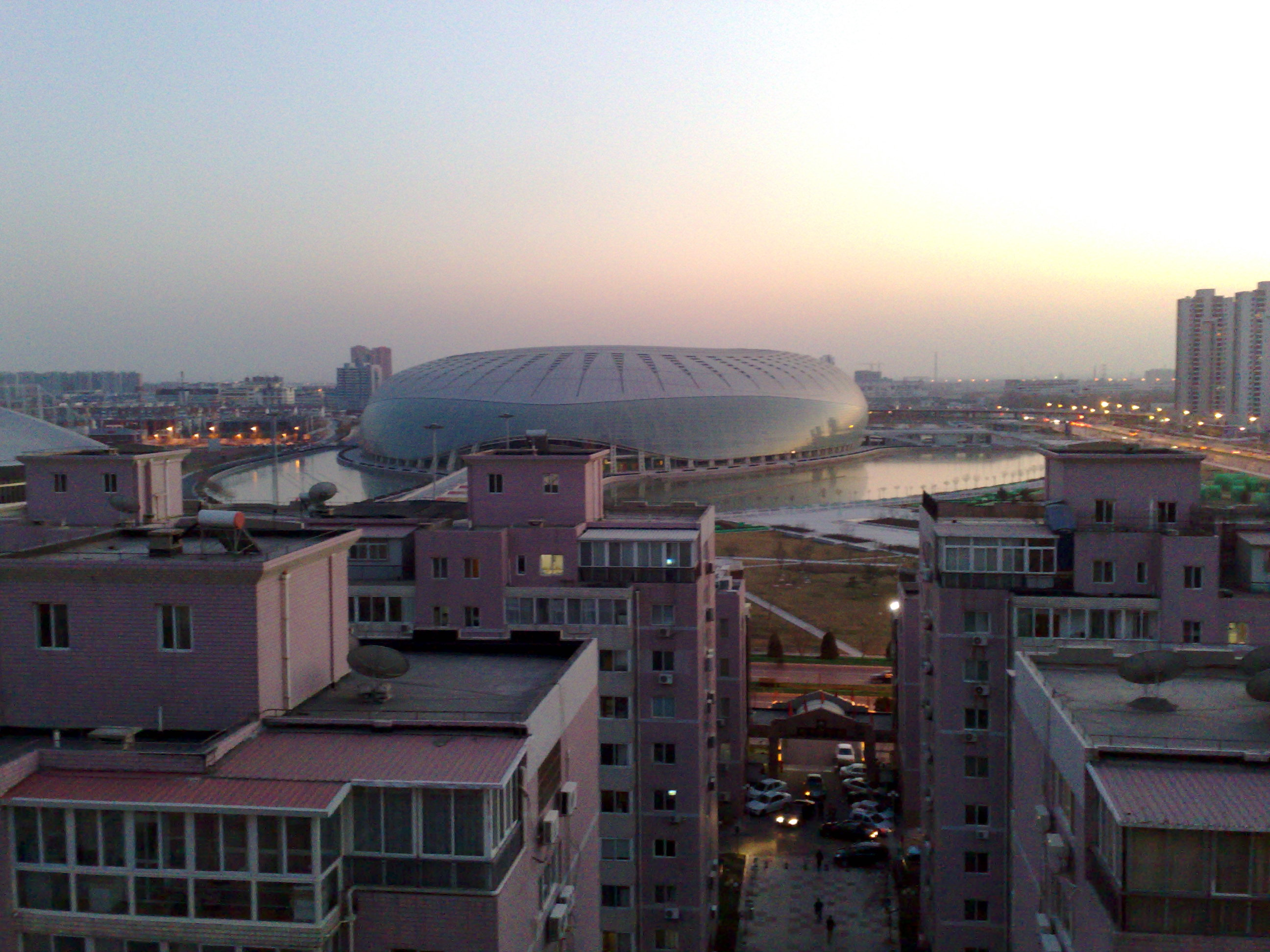
Tianjin Olympic Stadium from afar, 2008

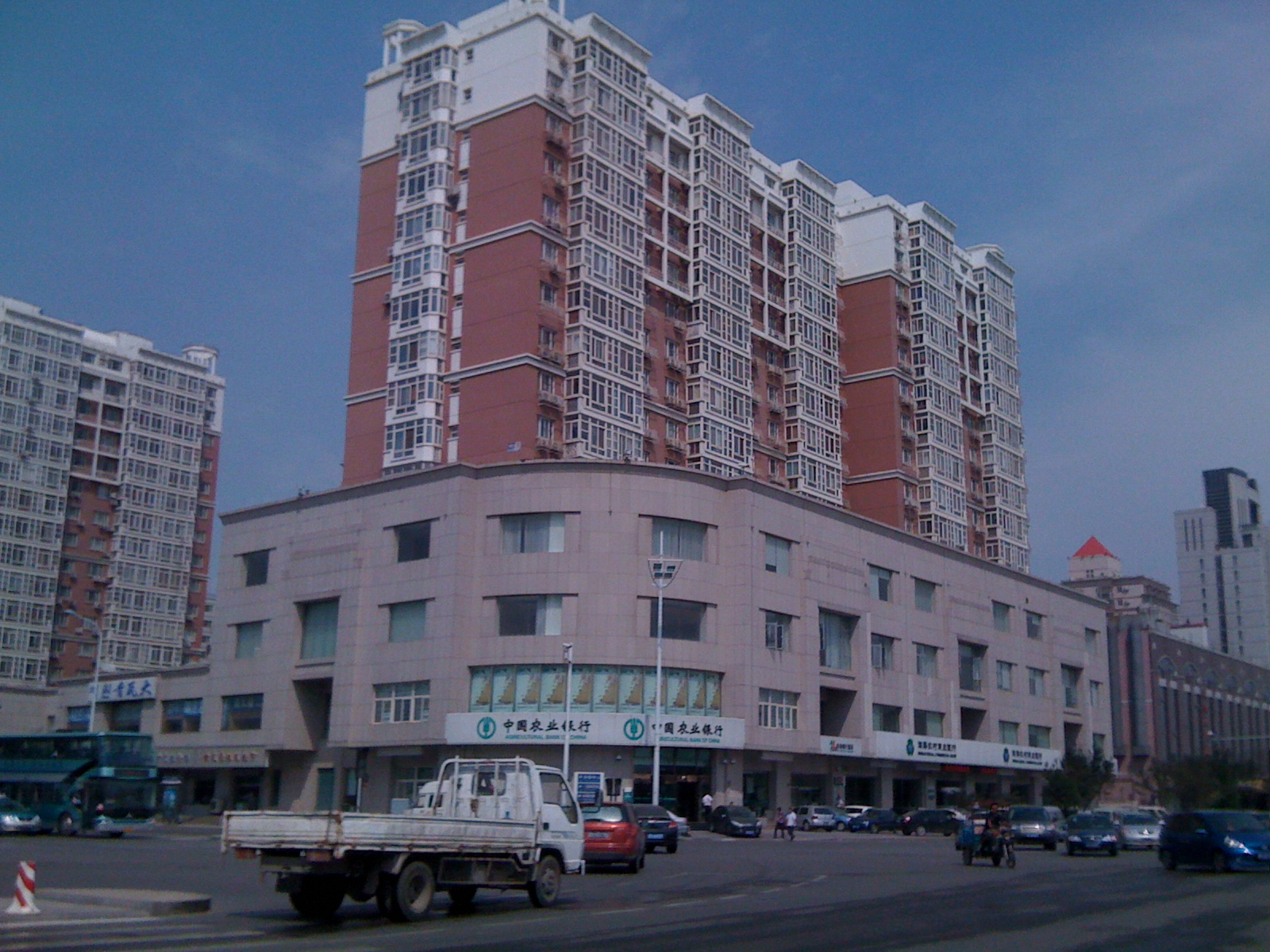
Intersection of Binshui West Avenue and Lingbin Road, 2010

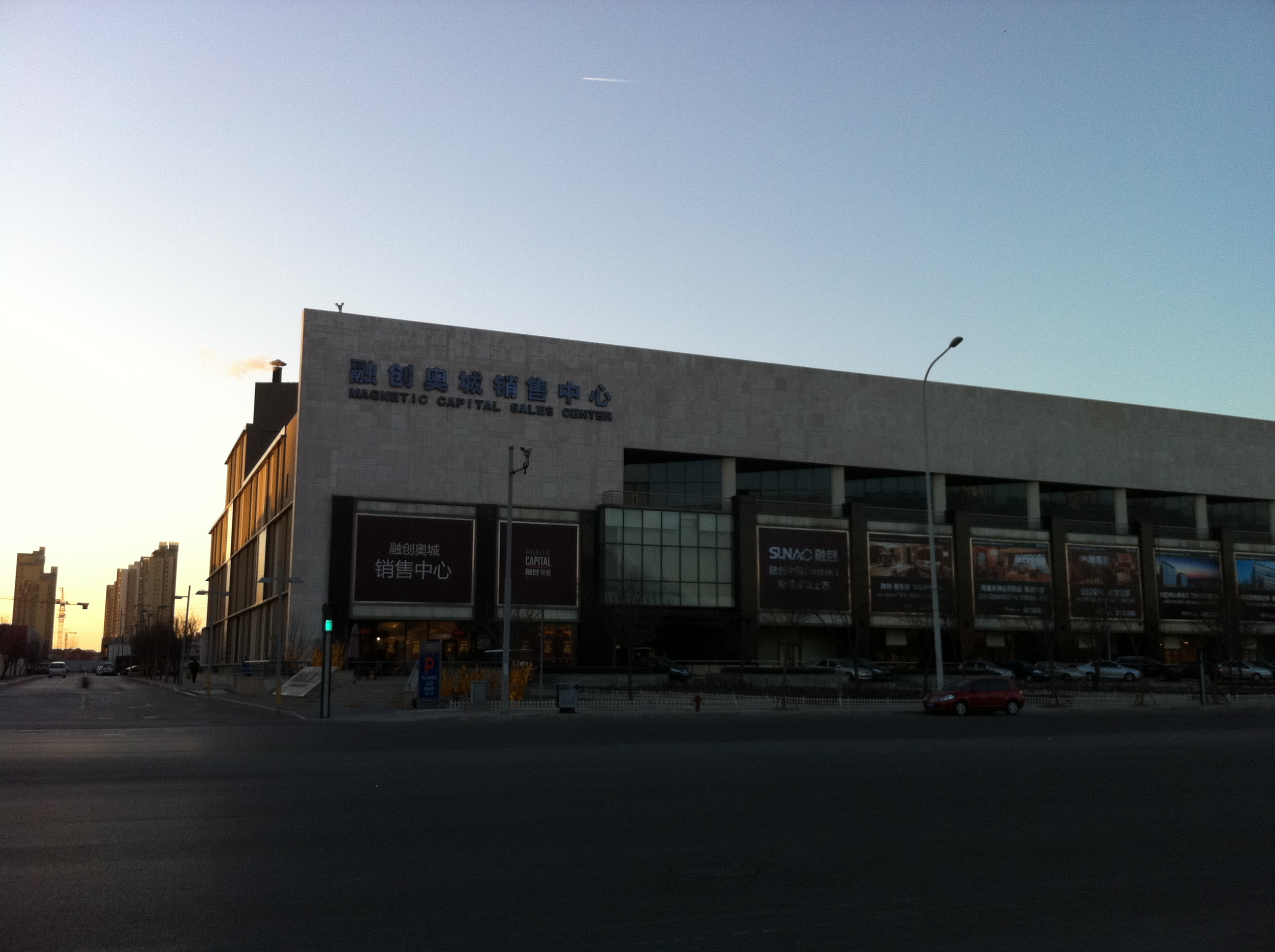
Magnetic Capital Sales Center, 2011

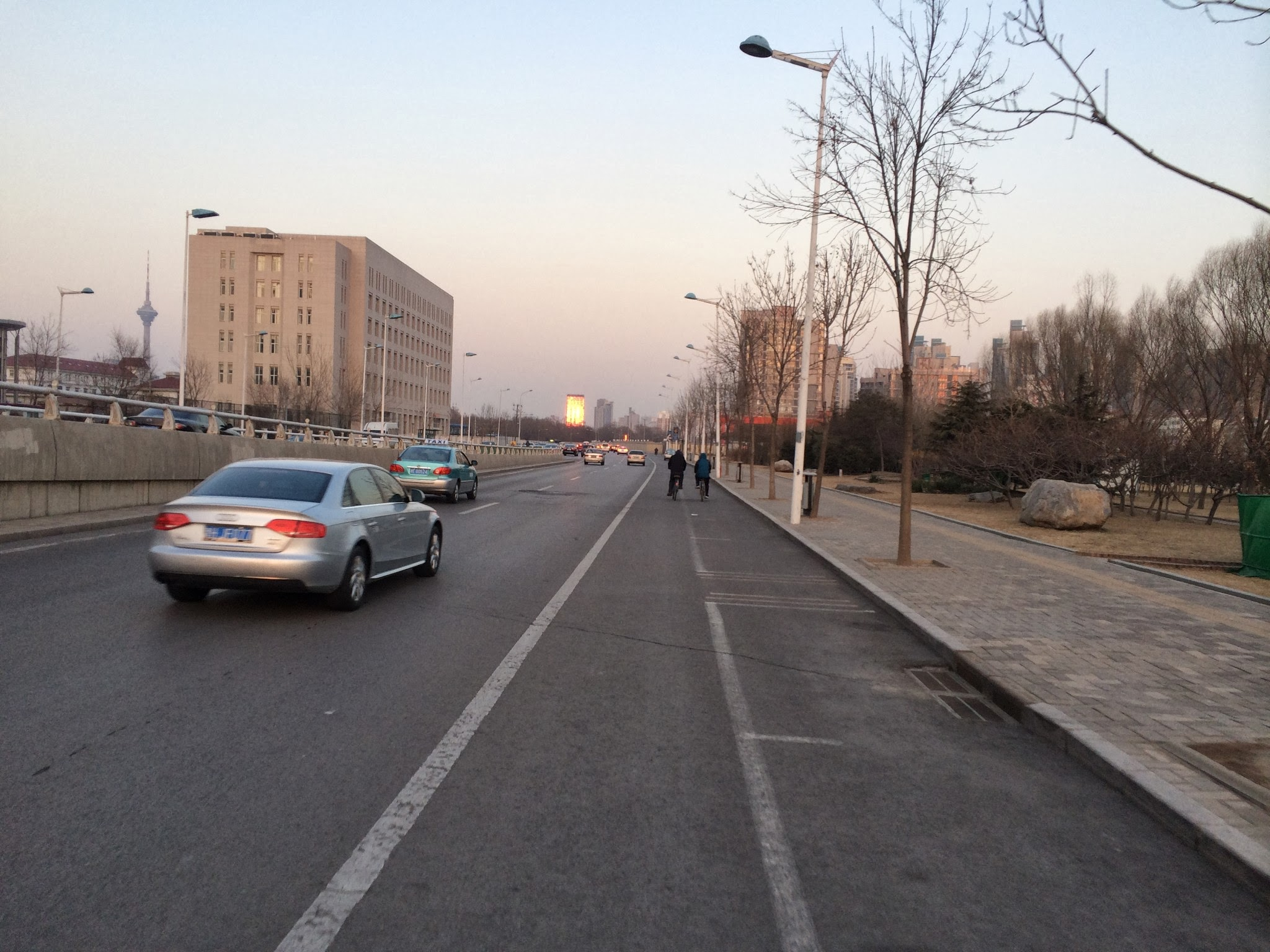
Binshui West Avenue on the northwest of the subdistrict, 2014
