= Tianjin Second People's Hospital =

Hospital in Tianjin, China

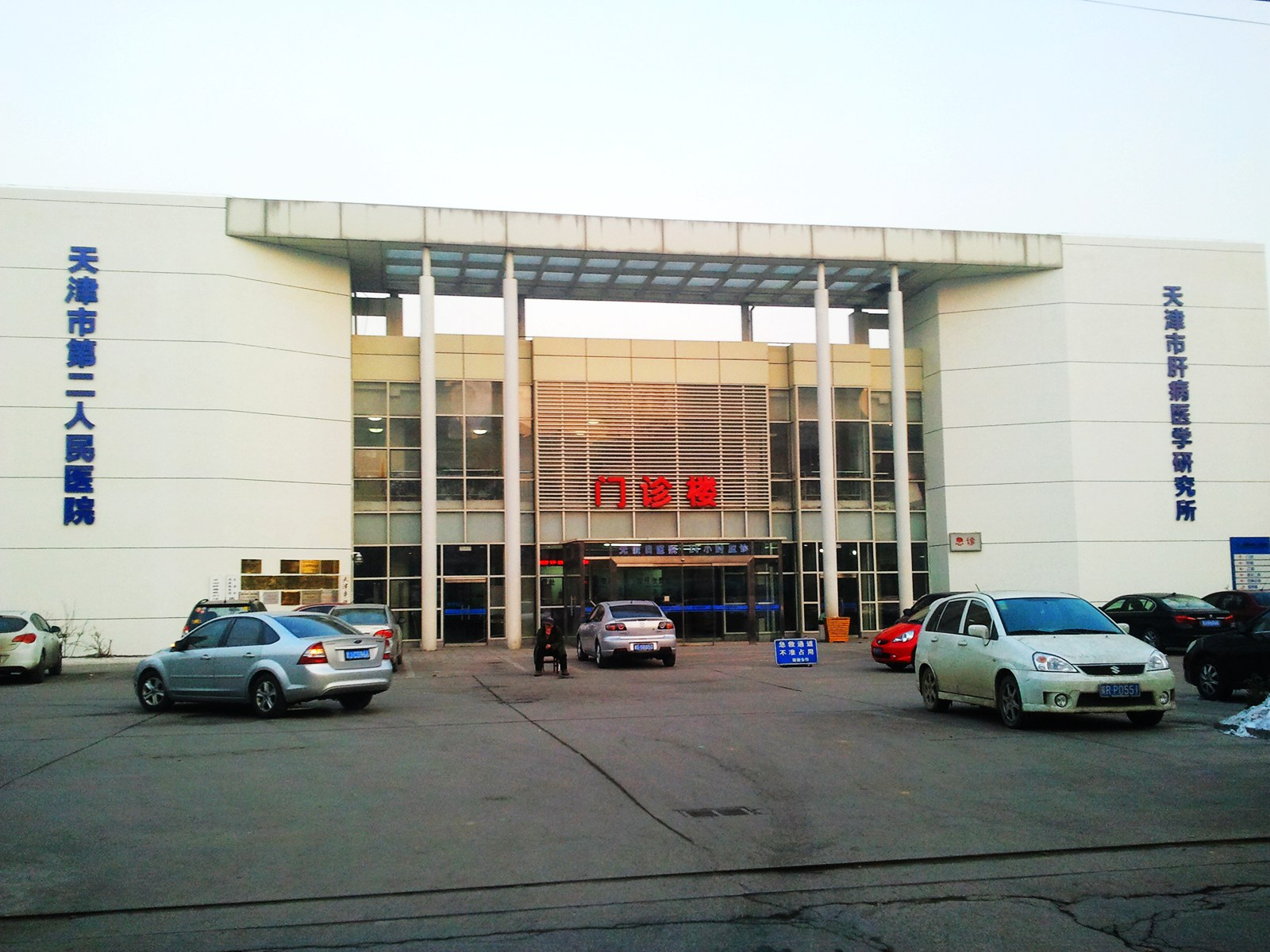
Tianjin Second People's Hospital

Tianjin Second People's Hospital, formerly known as Tianjin Infectious Disease Hospital, was founded in 1920. It is located on the west side of Jinhe River, No. 75 Sudi Road, Nankai District, Tianjin, People's Republic of China. It is a Class-A tertiary specialized hospital with the specialty of "infectious diseases". It is also one of the largest Class-A tertiary specialized hospitals for infectious diseases in the country.
