= Jialing Avenue Subdistrict =

Jialing Avenue Subdistrict 嘉陵道街道
- Subdistrict
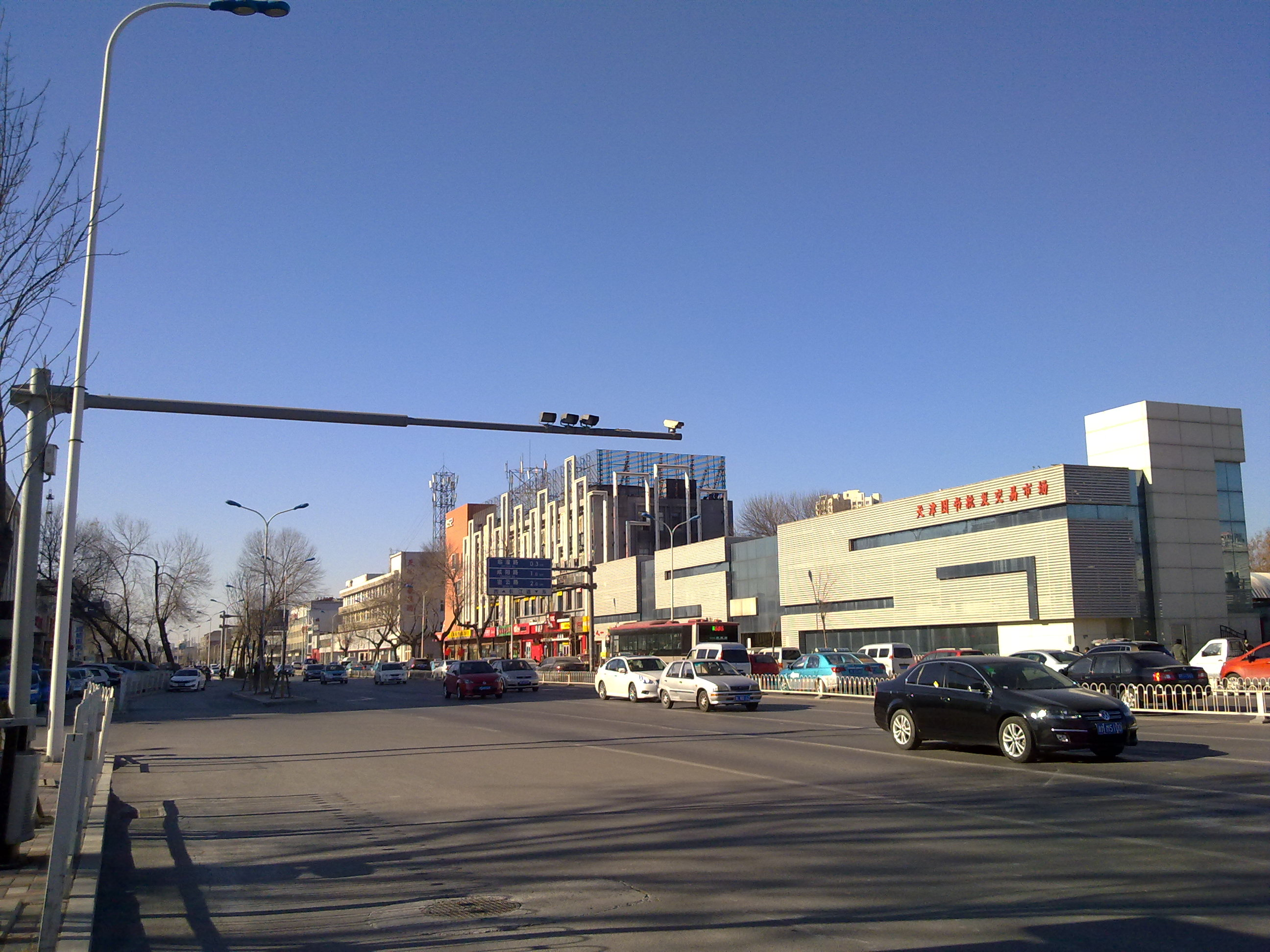
- Books Wholesale Market along Changjiang Avenue, 2013

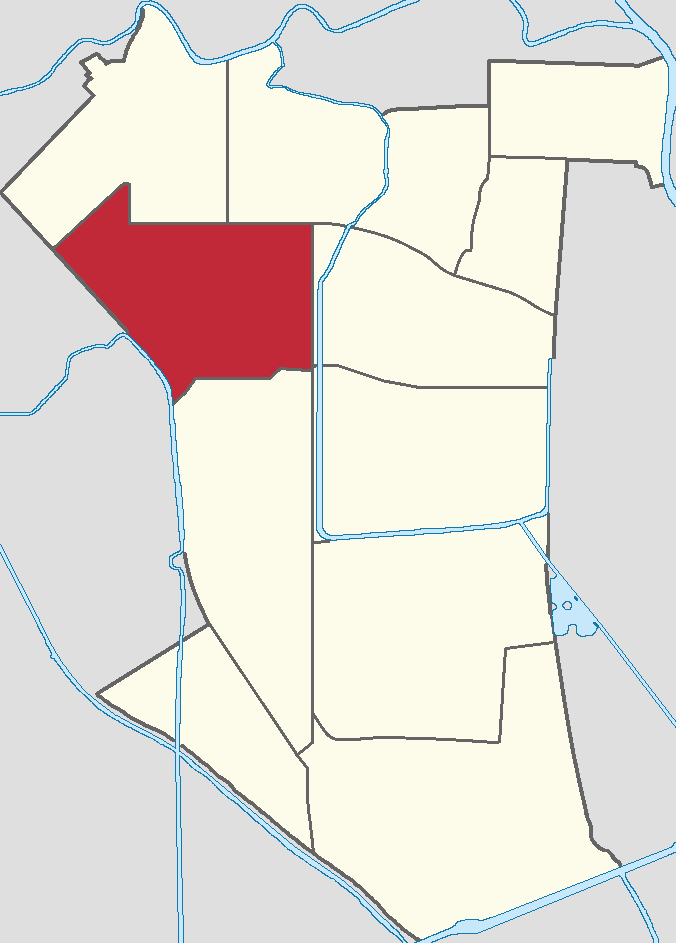
- Location within Nankai District

- Location within Tianjin Location within China
- Coordinates: 39°07′35″N 117°08′05″E
- Country: China
- Municipality: Tianjin
- District: Nankai
- Village-level Divisions: 16 communities

Area
  - Total: 3.92 km^{2} (1.51 sq mi)
- Elevation: 6 m (20 ft)

Population (2010)
  - Total: 102,405
  - Density: 26,100/km^{2} (67,700/sq mi)
- Time zone: UTC+8 (China Standard)
- Postal code: 300113
- Area code: 022

Jialing Avenue Subdistrict (Chinese: 嘉陵道街道; pinyin: Chánghóng Jiēdào) is a subdistrict in western Nankai District, Tianjin, China. It shares border Xiangyang Road and Changhong Subdistricts to its north, Wanxing Subdistrict to its east, Wangdingdi Subdistrict to its south, and Zhongbei Town in its west. The population for this subdistrict was 102,405 as of the 2010 census.

The region was developed into a residential area in 1976, formed as Changjiang Avenue Subdistrict in 1981, and renamed to Jialing (Chinese: 嘉陵; lit. 'Jia's Tomb') Avenue in 1984.

== Geography ==
Jialing Avenue subdistrict is located on the eastern bank of Chentaizi Paishui River. Chentangzhuang Branch Railway passes through the western portion of the subdistrict.

== Administrative divisions ==
By the end of 2021, Jialing Avenue Subdistrict comprised these 16 residential communities:

Subdivision names	Name transliterations
宜宾东里	Yibin Dongli
宜宾西里	Yibin Xili
泊江里	Bojiangli
罗江里	Luojiangli
雅安东里	Ya'an Dongli
咸阳里	Xianyangli
嘉陵北里	Jialing Beili
南江东里	Nanjiang Dongli
南江西里	Nanjiang Xili
雅安西里	Ya'an Xili
金川里	Jinchuanli
汶川里	Wenchuanli
易川里	Yichuanli
川南里	Chuannanli
云龙里	Yunlongli
桂荷园	Guiheyuan

== Gallery ==
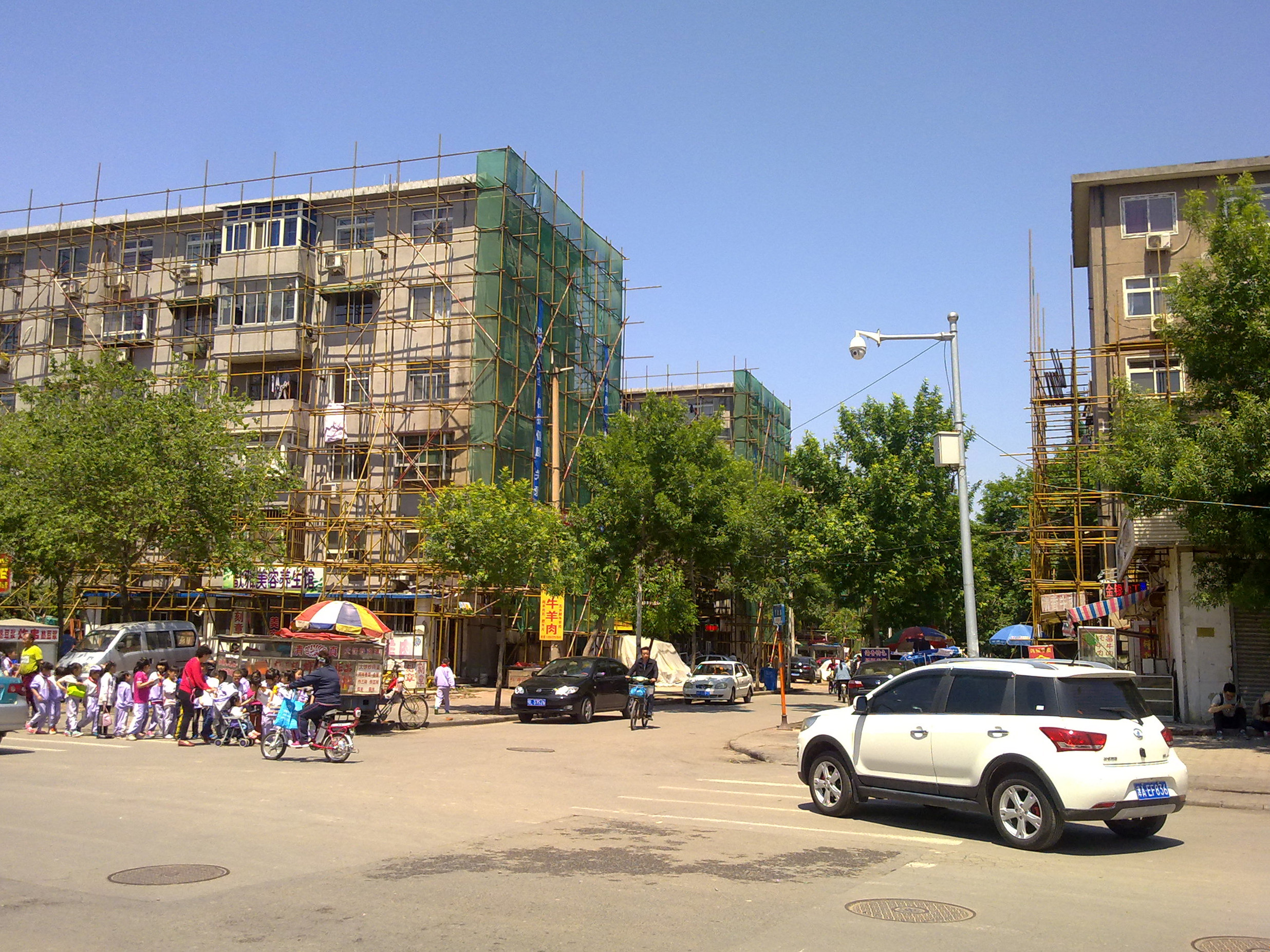
Intersection of Jialing Avenue and Luojiang Road, 2014

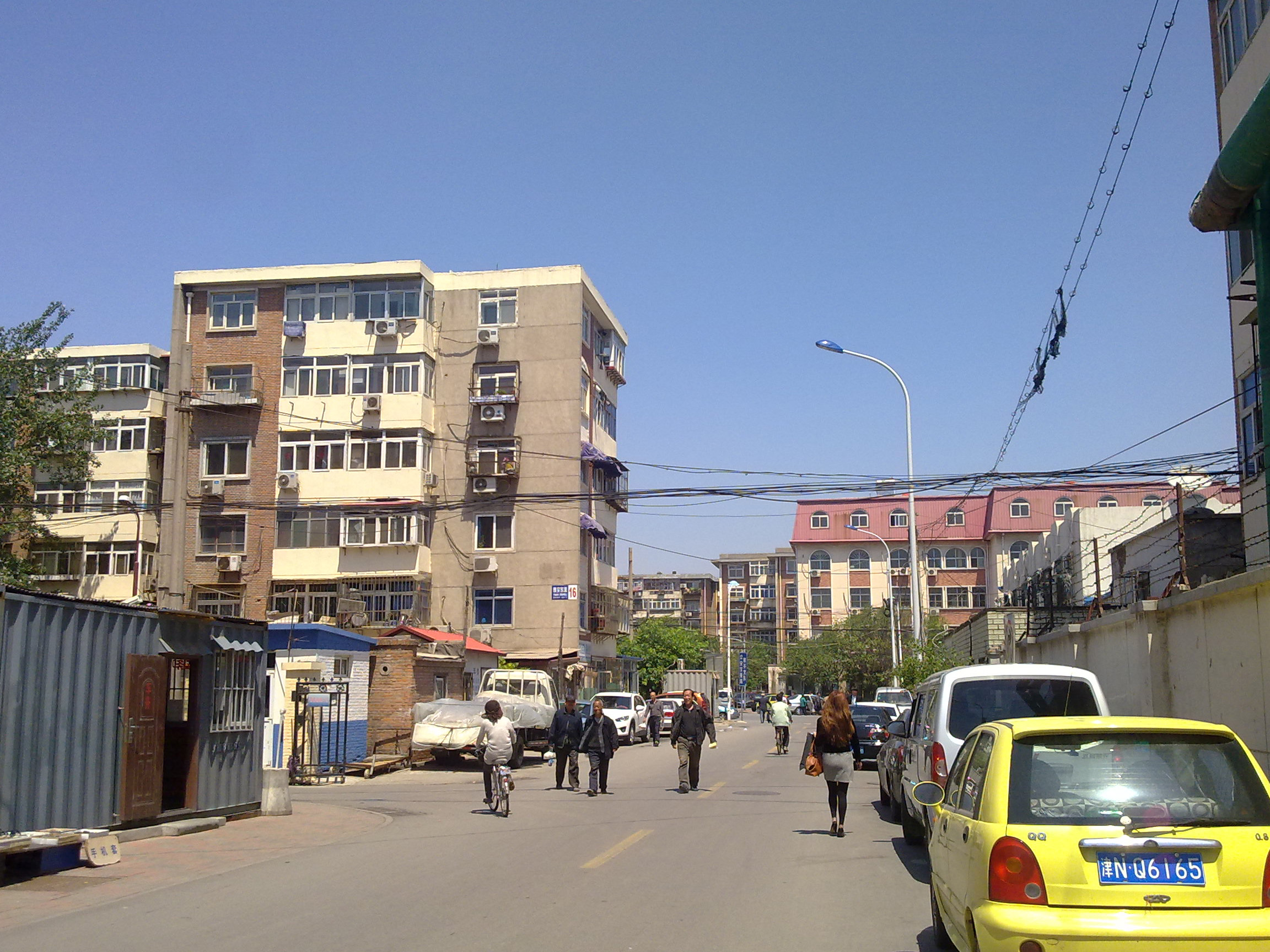
Yunyang Avenue, 2014
