= Guangkai Subdistrict =

Guangkai Subdistrict 广开街道
- Subdistrict
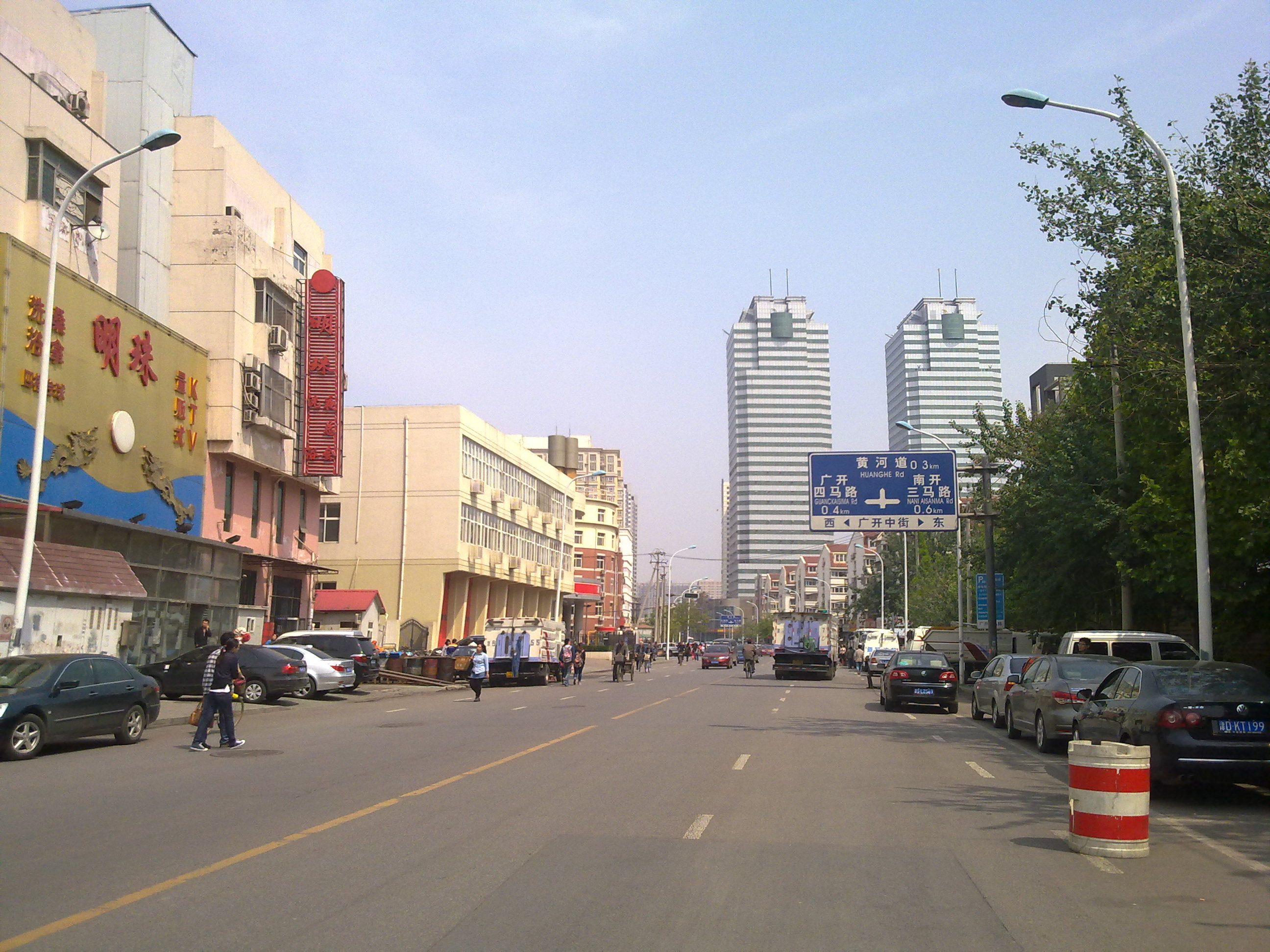
- Guangkai'er Road within the subdistrict, 2014

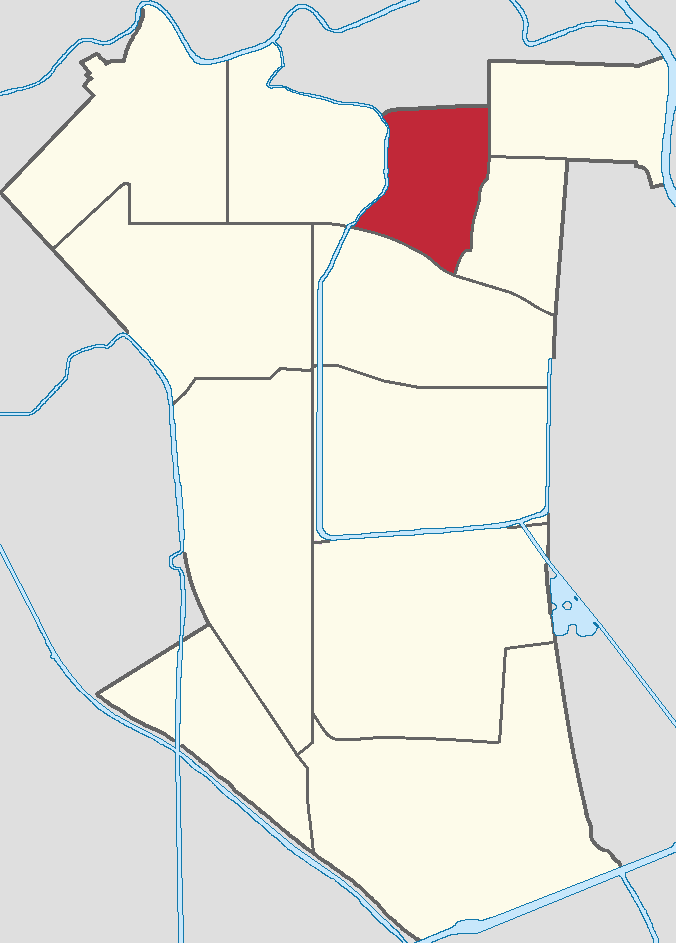
- Location in Nankai District

- Location within Tianjin Location within China
- Coordinates: 39°07′45″N 117°09′46″E
- Country: China
- Municipality: Tianjin
- District: Nankai
- Village-level Divisions: 13 communities

Area
  - Total: 1.72 km^{2} (0.66 sq mi)
- Elevation: 6 m (20 ft)

Population (2010)
  - Total: 73,299
  - Density: 42,600/km^{2} (110,000/sq mi)
- Time zone: UTC+8 (China Standard)
- Postal code: 300102
- Area code: 022

Guangkai Subdistrict (simplified Chinese: 广开街道; traditional Chinese: 廣開街道; pinyin: Guǎngkāi Jiēdào) is a subdistrict on the northern part of Nankai District, Tianjin, China. It borders Lingdangge Subdistrict to its north, Gulou and Xingnan Subdistircts to its east, Wanxing Subdistrict to its south, and Changhong Subdistrict to its west. In the year 2010, the subdistrict was home to 73,299 residents.

== History ==
History of Guangkai Subdistrict
Year	Status	Part of
1954 - 1956	Xushuichi Subdistrict Ximennan Subdistrict Liuhe Shichang Subdistrict Dongshengli Subdistrict	7th District, Tianjin
1956 - 1958	Xushuichi Subdistrict Ximennan Subdistrict Liuhe Shichang Subdistrict Dongshengli Subdistrict	Nankai District, Tianjin
1958 - 1960	Xushuichi Subdistrict Ximennan Subdistrict Dongshengli Subdistrict	Nankai District, Tianjin
1960 - 1962	Xushuichi People's Commune Ximennan People's Commune Dongshengli People's Commune	Nankai District, Tianjin
1962 - 1966	Xushuichi Subdistrict Ximennan Subdistrict Liuhe Shichang Subdistrict Dongshengli Subdistrict	Nankai District, Tianjin
1966 - 1968	Xushuichi Subdistrict Ximennan Subdistrict Liuhe Shichang Subdistrict Dongshengli Subdistrict	Dongfanghong District, Tianjin
1968 - 1978	Ximennan Subdistrict	Nankai District, Tianjin
1978 - 1999	Xushuichi Subdistrict Ximennan Subdistrict Liuhe Shichang Subdistrict Dongshengli Subdistrict	Nankai District, Tianjin
1999–present	Guangkai Subdistrict	Nankai District, Tianjin

== Administrative divisions ==
As of 2021, Guangkai Subdistrict was made up of 13 residential communities. They are listed in the table below:

Subdivision names	Name transliterations
桦林园	Hualinyuan
朝园里	Chaoyuanli
颂禹里	Songyuli
康舜里	Kangshunli
级升里	Jishengli
卫安西里	Wei'an Xili
卫安中里	Wei'an Zhongli
新丽里	Xinlili
瑞德里	Ruideli
凯兴天宝公寓	Kaixing Tianbao Gongyu
格调春天	Gediao Chuntian
宝龙湾	Baolongwan
风荷天江	Fenghe Tianjiang

== Gallery ==
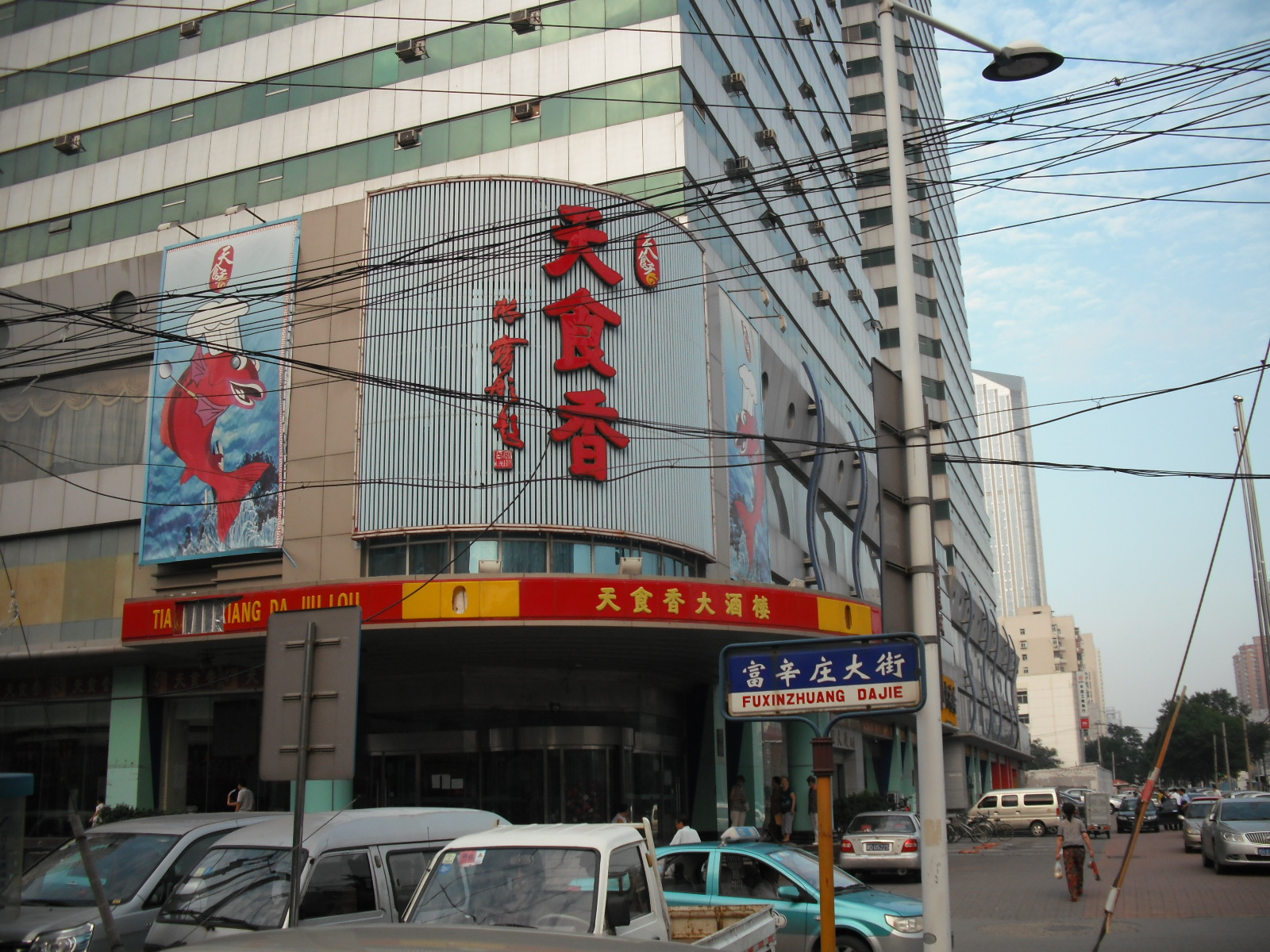
Huanghe Avenue, 2011

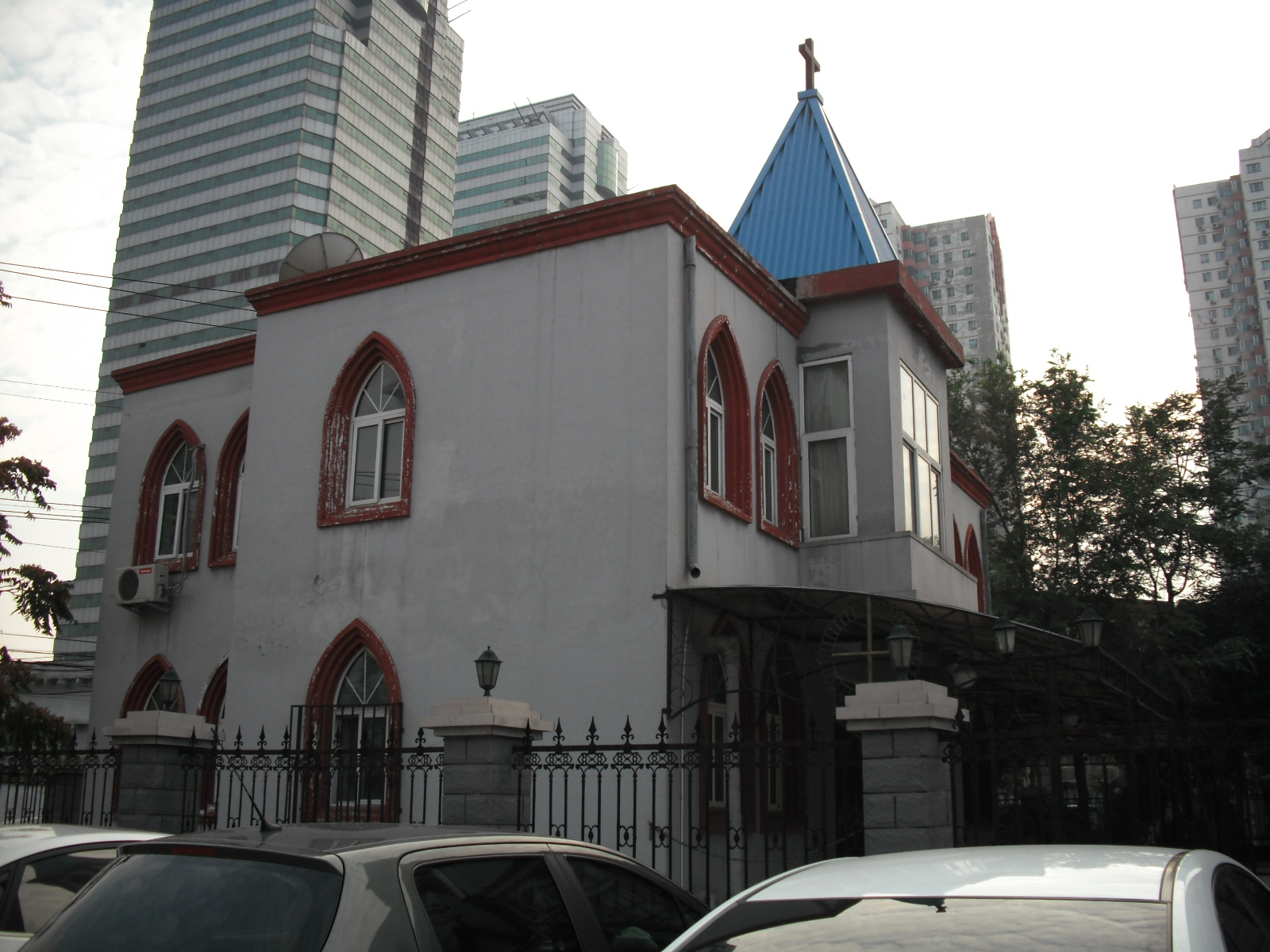
Fuxinzhuang Catheral, 2011

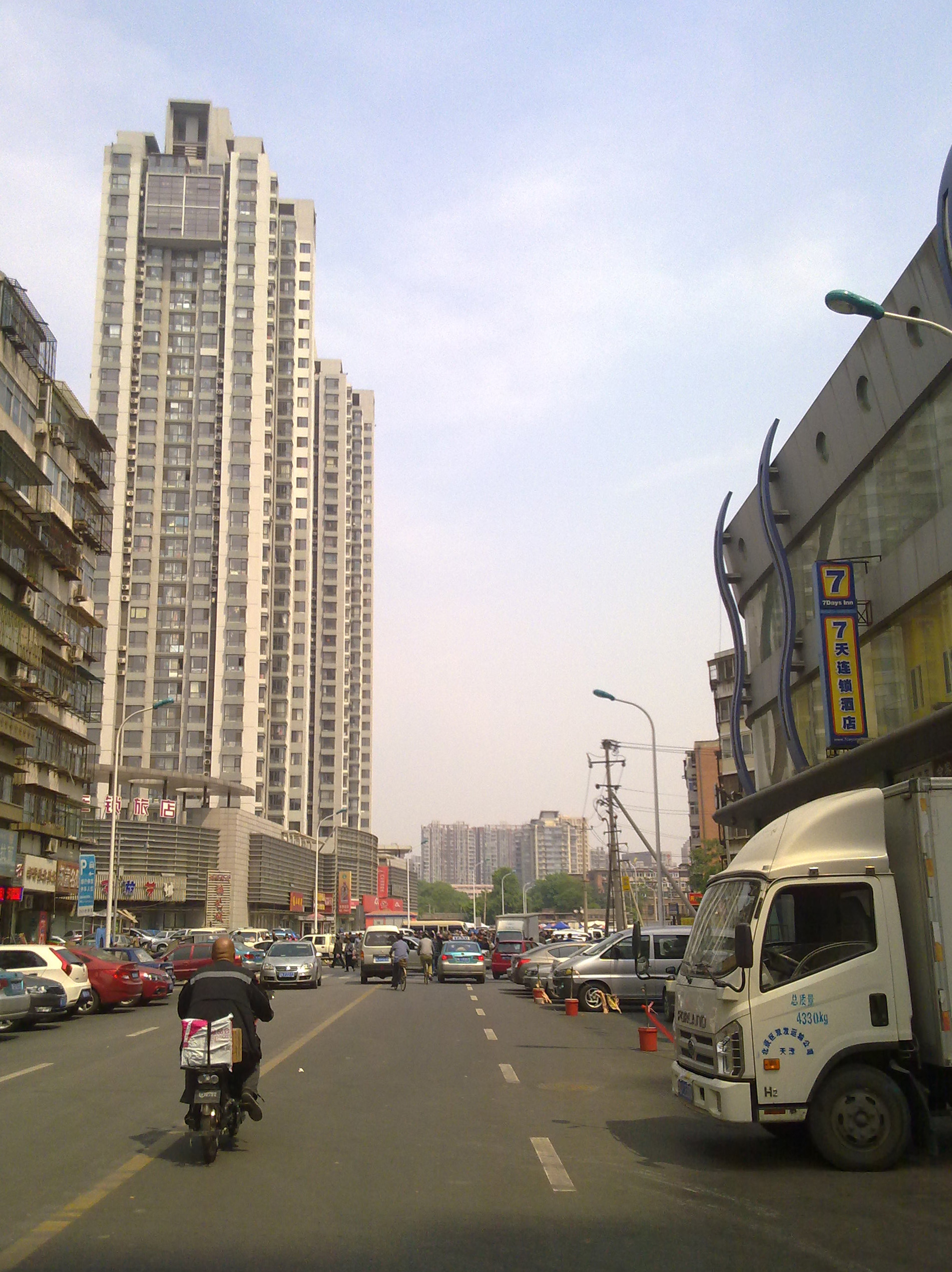
Street view of Fuxinzhuang Avenune, 2014

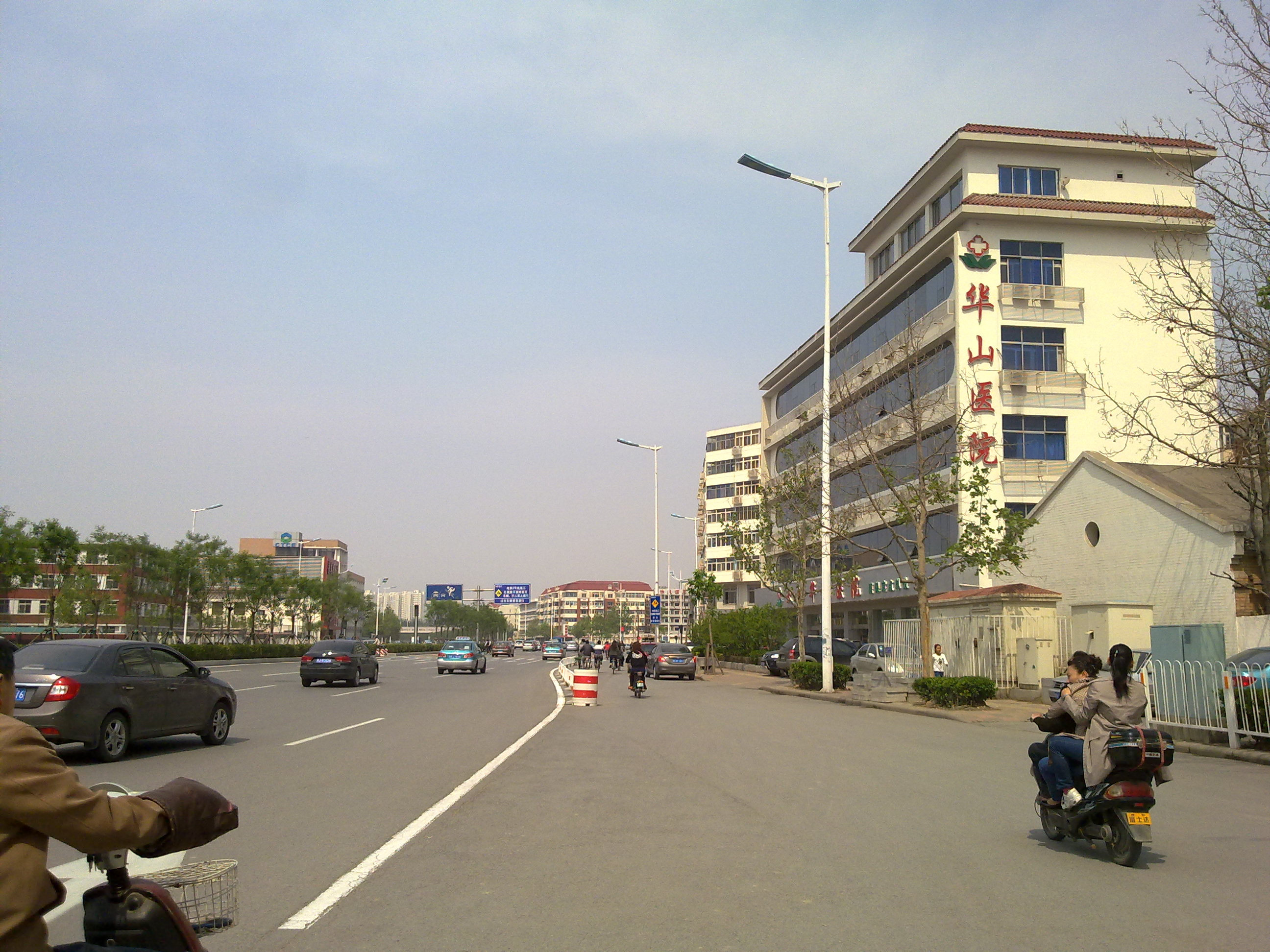
Changjiang Avenue, 2014
