= Wangdingdi Subdistrict =

Wangdingdi Subdistrict 王顶堤街道
- Subdistrict
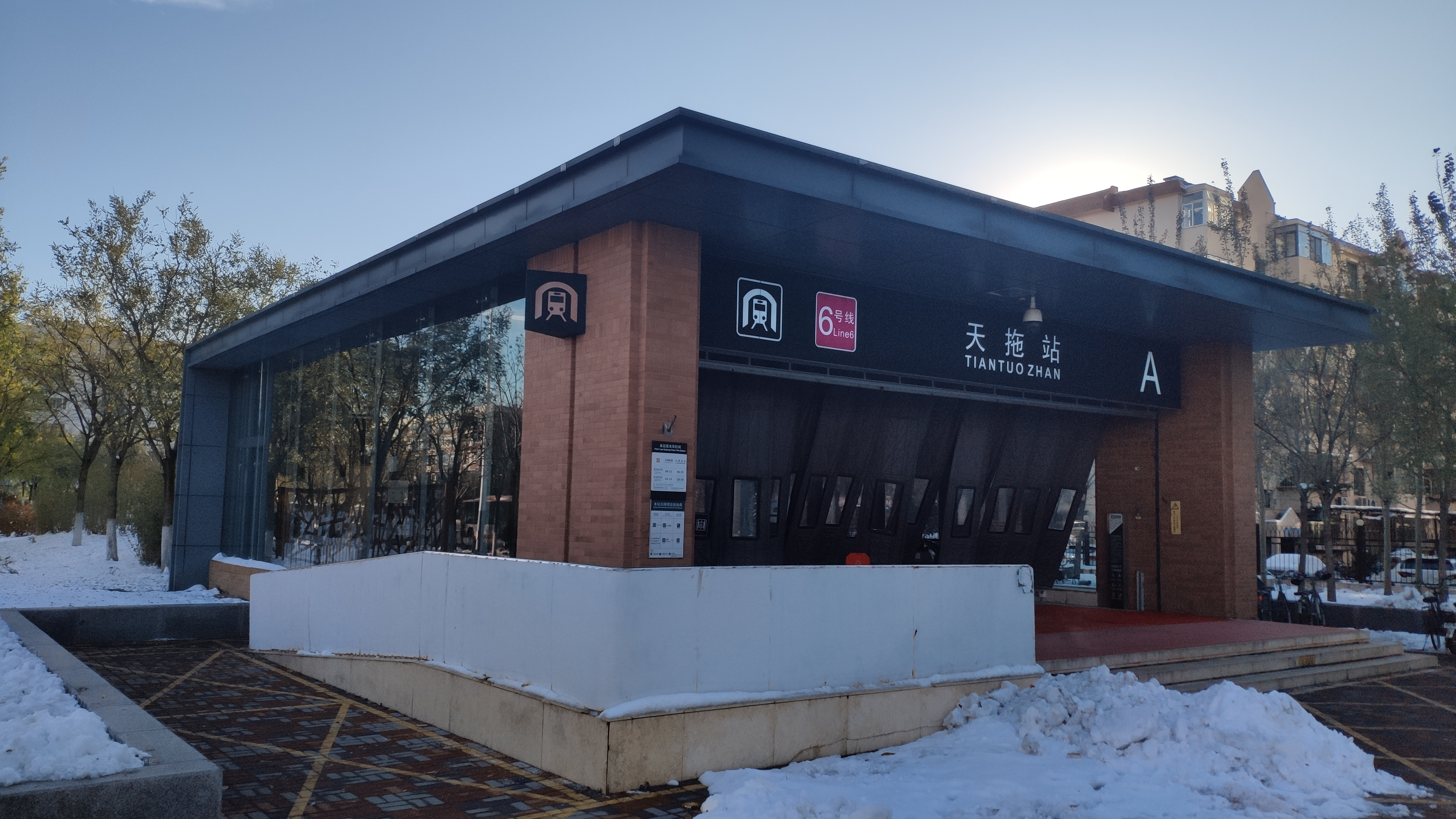
- Tiantuo Station of Tianjin Subway within the subdistrict, 2021

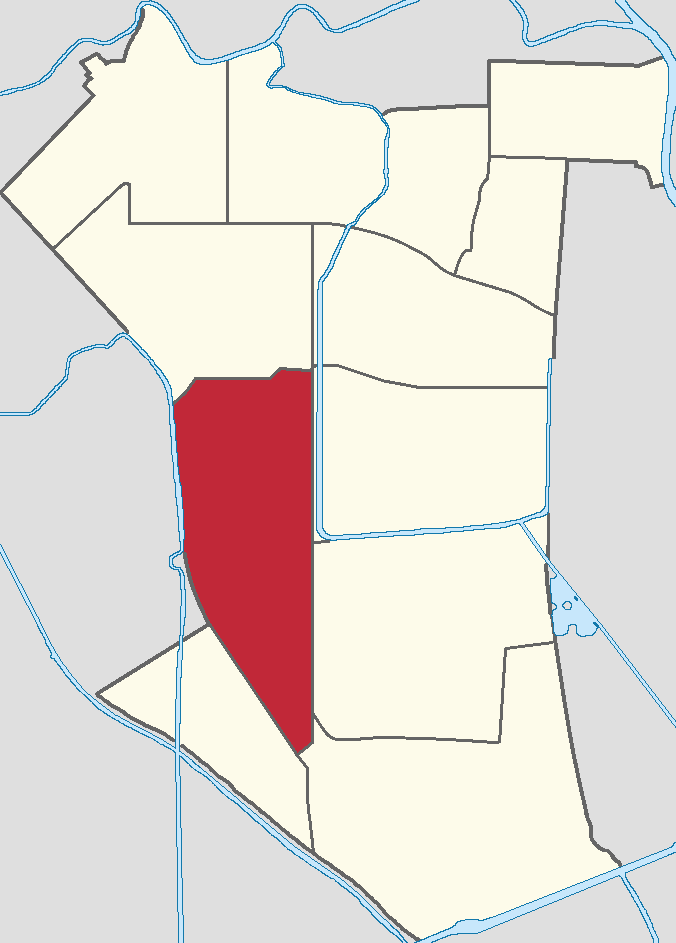
- Location in Nankai District

- Location within Tianjin Location within China
- Coordinates: 39°06′05″N 117°08′20″E
- Country: China
- Municipality: Tianjin
- District: Nankai
- Village-level Divisions: 26 communities

Area
  - Total: 4.69 km^{2} (1.81 sq mi)
- Elevation: 7 m (23 ft)

Population (2010)
  - Total: 122,599
  - Density: 26,100/km^{2} (67,700/sq mi)
- Time zone: UTC+8 (China Standard)
- Postal code: 300190
- Area code: 022

Wangdingdi Subdistrict (simplified Chinese: 王顶堤街道; traditional Chinese: 王頂堤街道; pinyin: Wángdǐngdī Jiēdào) is one of the 12 subdistricts within Nankai District, Tianjin, China. It is located in the south of Jialing Avenue Subdistrict, west of Xuefu and Shuishanggongyuan Subdistricts, north of Tiyuzhongxin and Huayuan Subdistricts, and east of New Technology Industrial Park and Xiyingmen Subdistrict. According to the 2010 Chinese Census, Wangdingdi Subdistrict was home to 122,599 inhabitants.

The name Wangdingdi (Chinese: 王顶堤; lit. 'Wang Top Dam') comes from a village by the same name that used to exist within the region.

== Geography ==
Wangdingdi subdistrict lies on the eastern bank of Chentaizi Paishui River.

== History ==
Timeline of Wangdingdi's History
Year	Status	Part of
1952 - 1984		Xijiao District, Tianjin
1984 - 1986	Chengjiang Road Subdistrict	Nankai District, Tianjin
1986 - 1999	Chengjiang Road Subdistrict; Wangdingdi Subdistrict	Nankai District, Tianjin
1999–present	Wangdingdi Subdistrict	Nankai District, Tianjin

== Administrative divisions ==
Below is a table listing all 26 residential communities of Wangdingdi Subdistrict:

Subdivision names	Name transliterations
昌宁里	Changningli
保山北里	Baoshan Beili
保山南里	Baoshan Nanli
淦江里	Ganjiangli
华宁南里	Huaning Nanli
华宁北里	Huaning Beili
横江里	Hengjiangli
盈江西里	Yingjiang Xili
盈江东里	Yingjiang Dongli
金环里	Jinhuanli
迎水里	Yingshuili
金厦里	Jinshali
凤园北里	Fengyuan Beili
凤园南里	Fengyuan Nanli
迎风里	Yingfengli
林苑东里	Linyuan Dongli
园荫里	Yuanyinli
林苑西里	Linyuan Xili
鹤园北里	Heyuan Beili
林苑北里	Linyuan Beili
美云里	Meiyunli
金典花园	Jindian Huayuan
金冠里	Jinguanli
天拖西	Tiantuoxi
天拖东	Tiantuodong
艳阳路	Yanyanglu

== Gallery ==
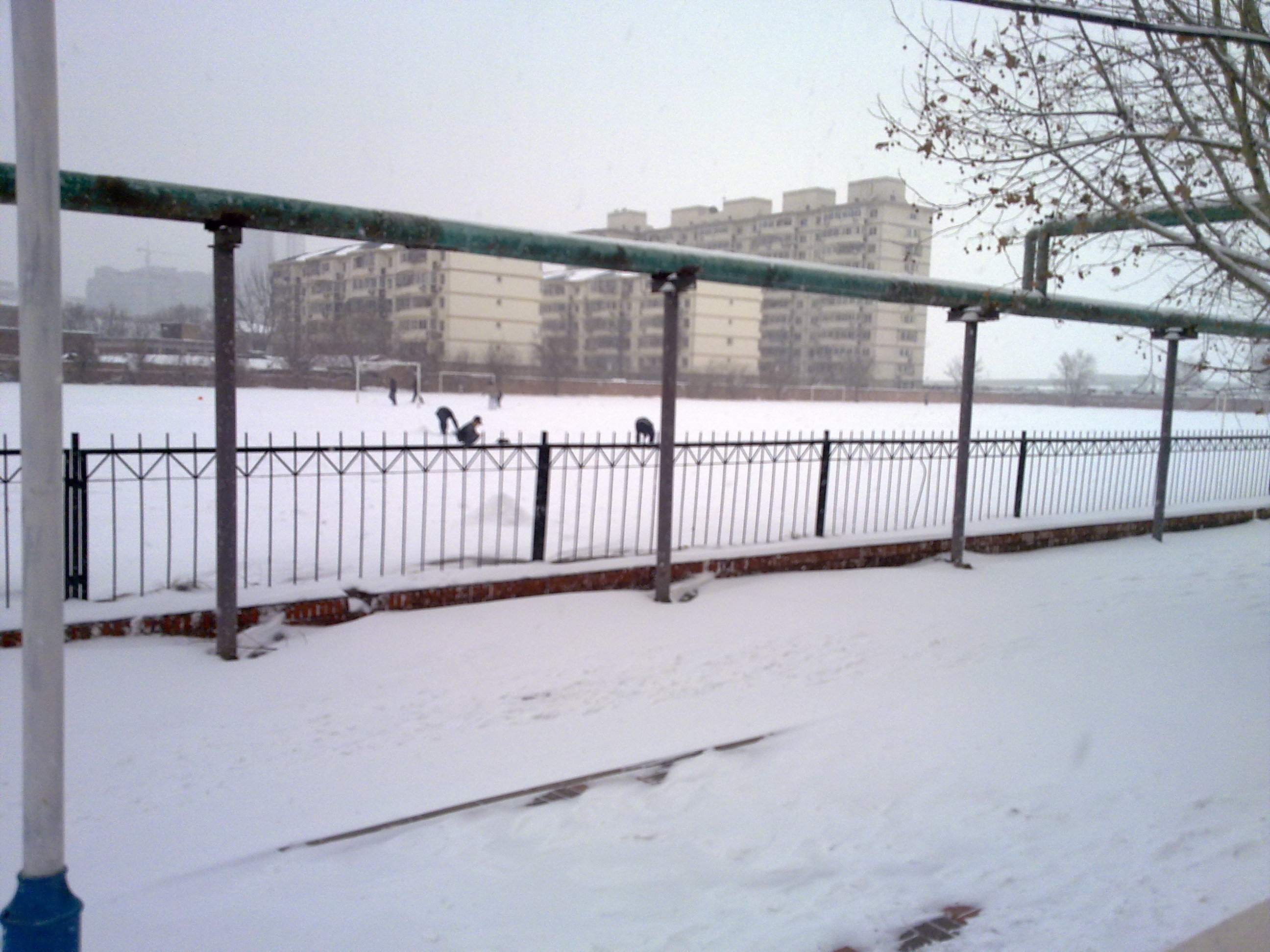
Yingshuidao Campus of Nankai University, 2010

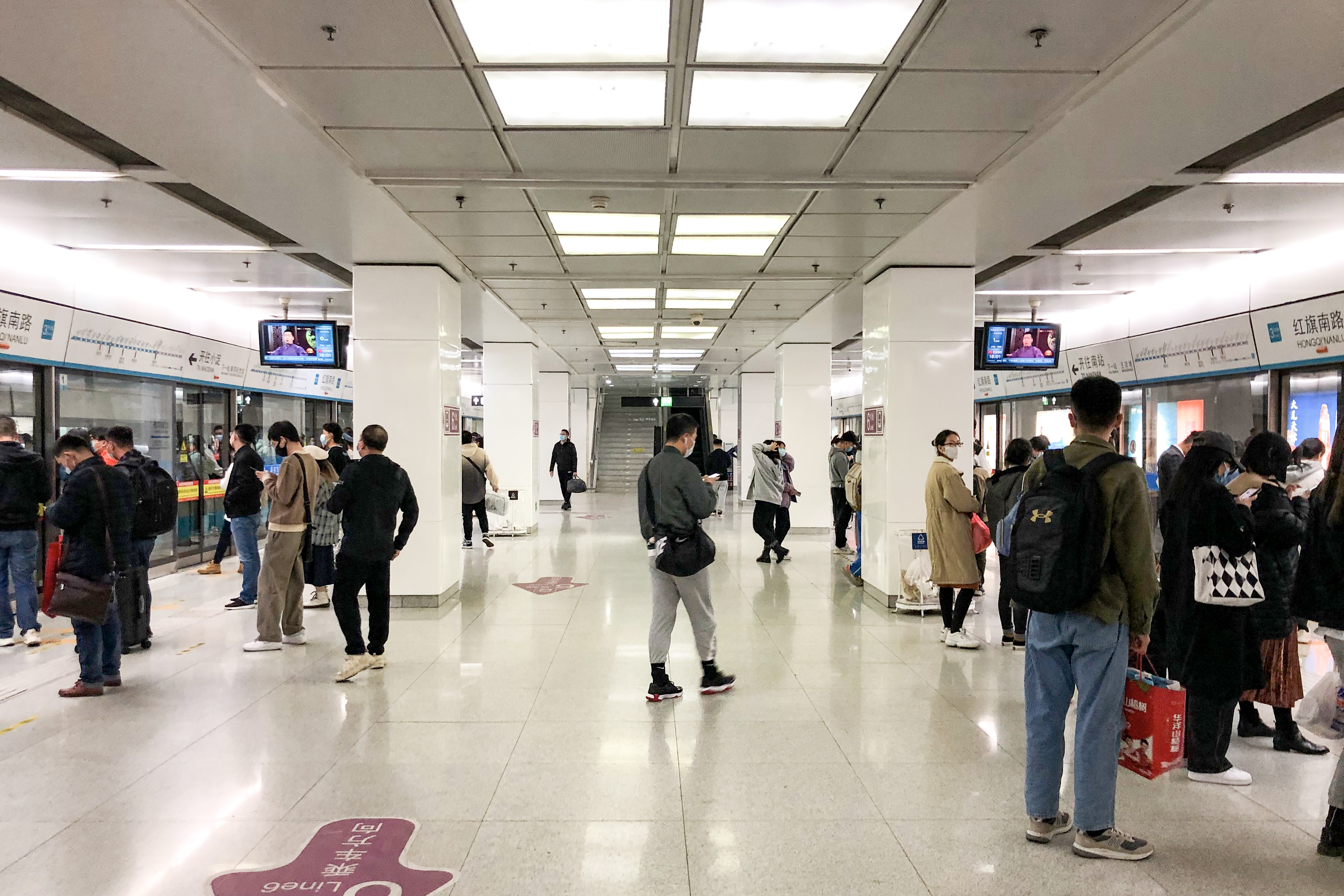
Platform of Hongqi'nanlu Station, 2021
