= Shuishanggongyuan Subdistrict =

Shuishanggongyuan Subdistrict 水上公园街道
- Subdistrict
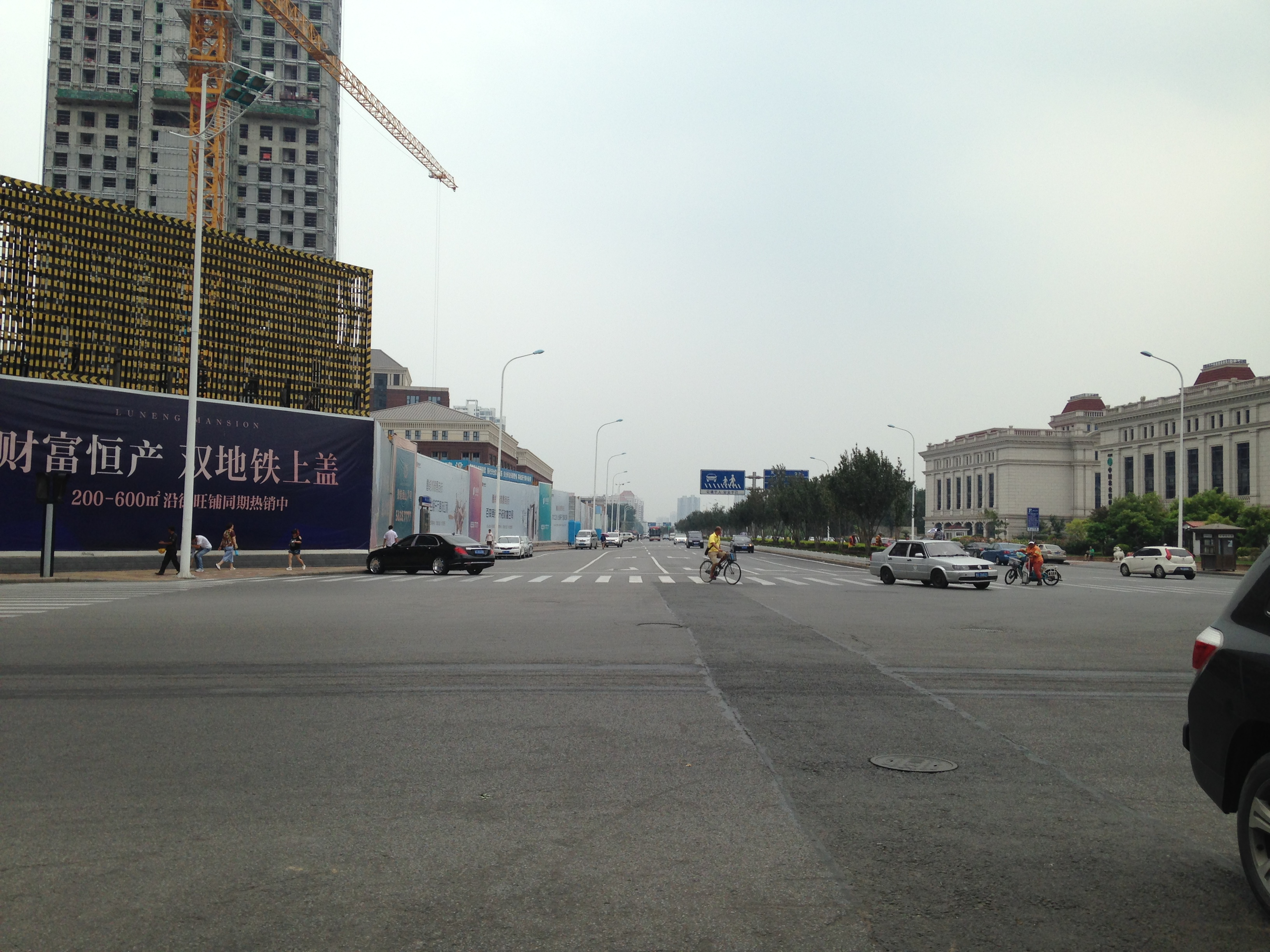
- Shuishang Gongyuan Road within the subdistrict, 2016

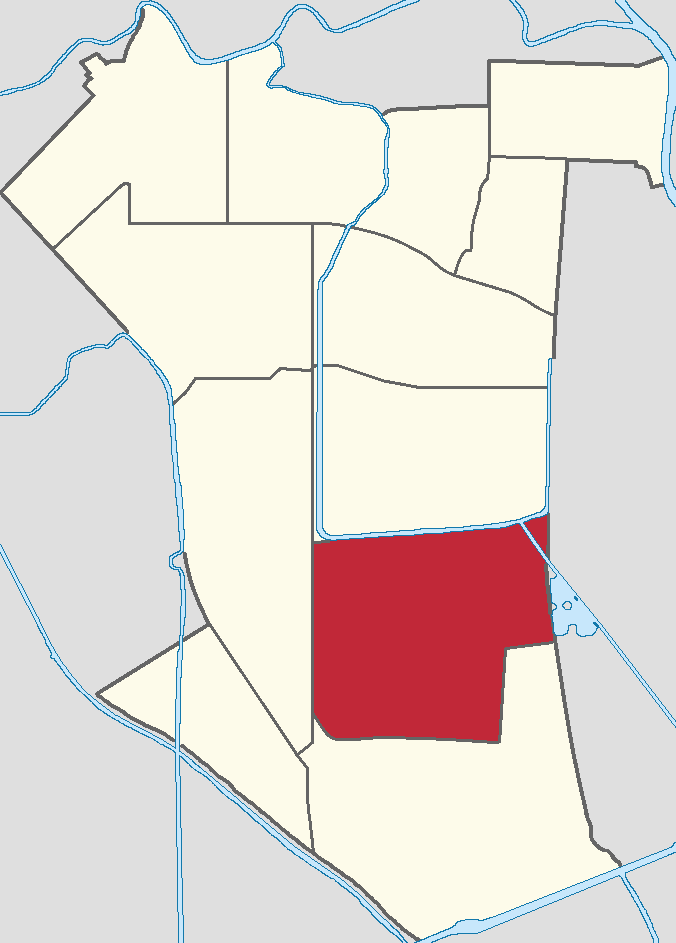
- Location of Shuishanggongyuan Subdistrict in Nankai District

- Location within Tianjin Location within China
- Coordinates: 39°05′44″N 117°09′13″E
- Country: China
- Municipality: Tianjin
- District: Nankai
- Village-level Divisions: 10 communities

Area
  - Total: 5.26 km^{2} (2.03 sq mi)
- Elevation: 7 m (23 ft)

Population (2010)
  - Total: 64,853
  - Density: 12,300/km^{2} (31,900/sq mi)
- Time zone: UTC+8 (China Standard)
- Postal code: 300191
- Area code: 022

Shuishanggongyuan Subdistrict (simplified Chinese: 水上公园街道; traditional Chinese: 水上公園街道; pinyin: Shuǐshànggōngyuán Jiēdào) is a subdistrict situated on the south of Nankai District, Tianjin, China. It borders Xuefu Subdistrict to the north, Machang and Tianta Subdistricts to the east, Tiyuzhongxin Subdistrict to the south, and Wangdingdi Subdistrict to the west. Its population was 64,853 as of 2010.

The subdistrict's name literally means "Water Park", which is referring to the Tianjin Water Park on the southeast of the subdistrict.

== Geography ==
Shuishanggongyuan subdistrict is on the south of Fukang River, and west of Weijin River and Tianta Lake.

== History ==
History of Shuishanggongyuan Subdistrict
Year	Status	Belong to
1949 - 1952	32nd Street	11th District, Tianjin
1952 - 1954	Balitai Street	7th District, Tianjin
1954 - 1956	Balitai Subdistrict	7th District, Tianjin
1956 - 1958	Balitai Subdistrict	Nankai District, Tianjin
1958 - 1966	Under Wandezhuang Subdistrict	Nankai District, Tianjin
1966 - 1968	Under Wandezhuang Subdistrict	Dongfanghong District, Tianjin
1968 - 1984	Under Wandezhuang Subdistrict	Nankai District, Tianjin
1984 - 2006	Balitai Subdistrict	Nankai District, Tianjin
2006–present	Shuishanggongyuan Subdistrict	Nankai District, Tianjin

== Administrative divisions ==
As of 2021, Shuishanggongyuan Subdistrict consisted of 10 residential communities. They can be seen in the list below:

Subdivision names	Name transliterations
荣迁里	Rongqianli
临园里	Linyuanli
复康里	Fukangli
鲁能公馆	Luneng Gongguan
宁福里	Ningfuli
利德公寓	Lide Gongyu
观景里	Guanjingli
观园里	Guanyuanli
水上公寓	Shuishang Gongyu
欣苑公寓	Xinyuan Gongyu

== Gallery ==
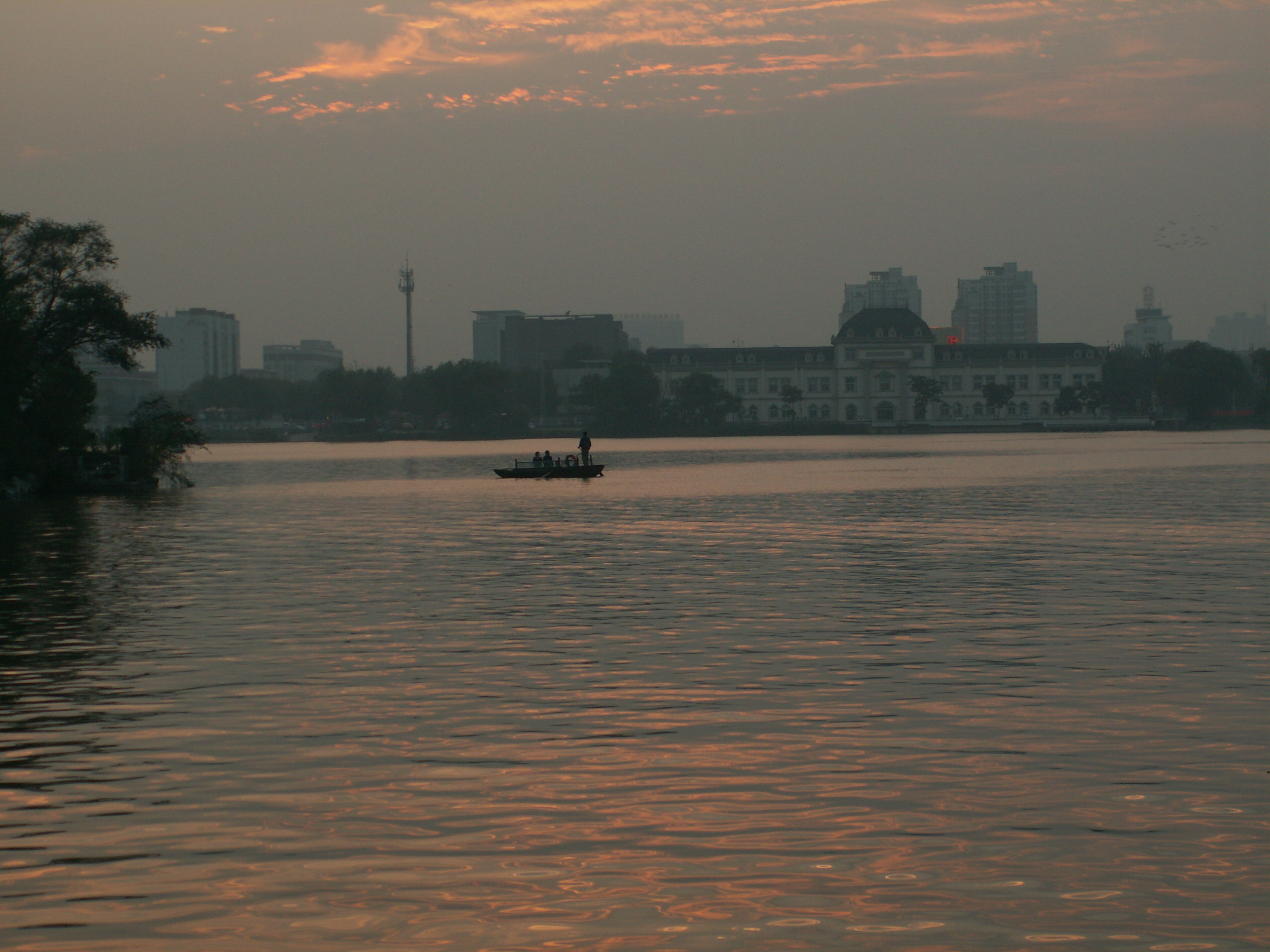
East Lake of the Tianjin Water Park, 2007

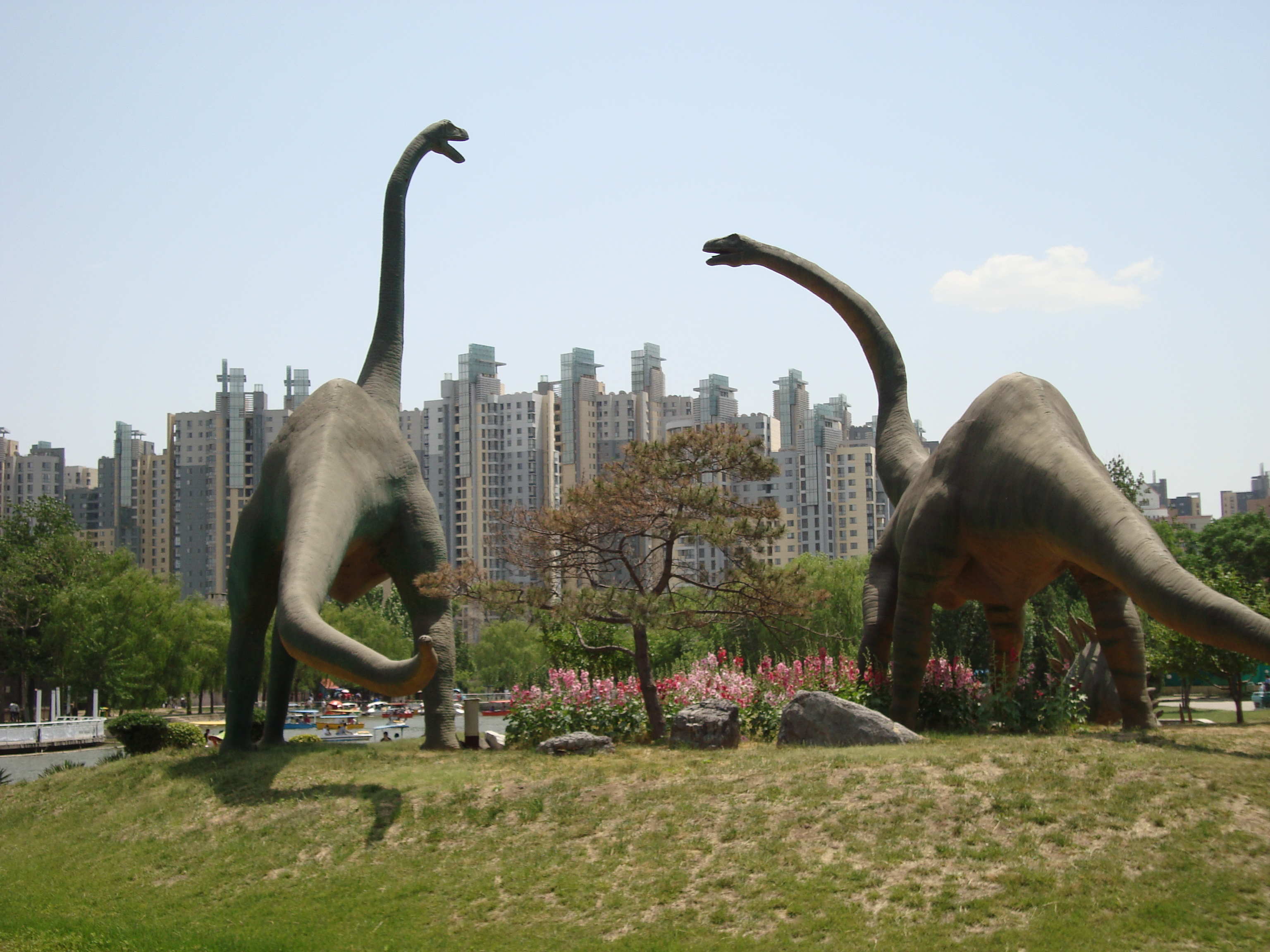
Statues of Dinosaurs near Tianjin Zoo, 2009

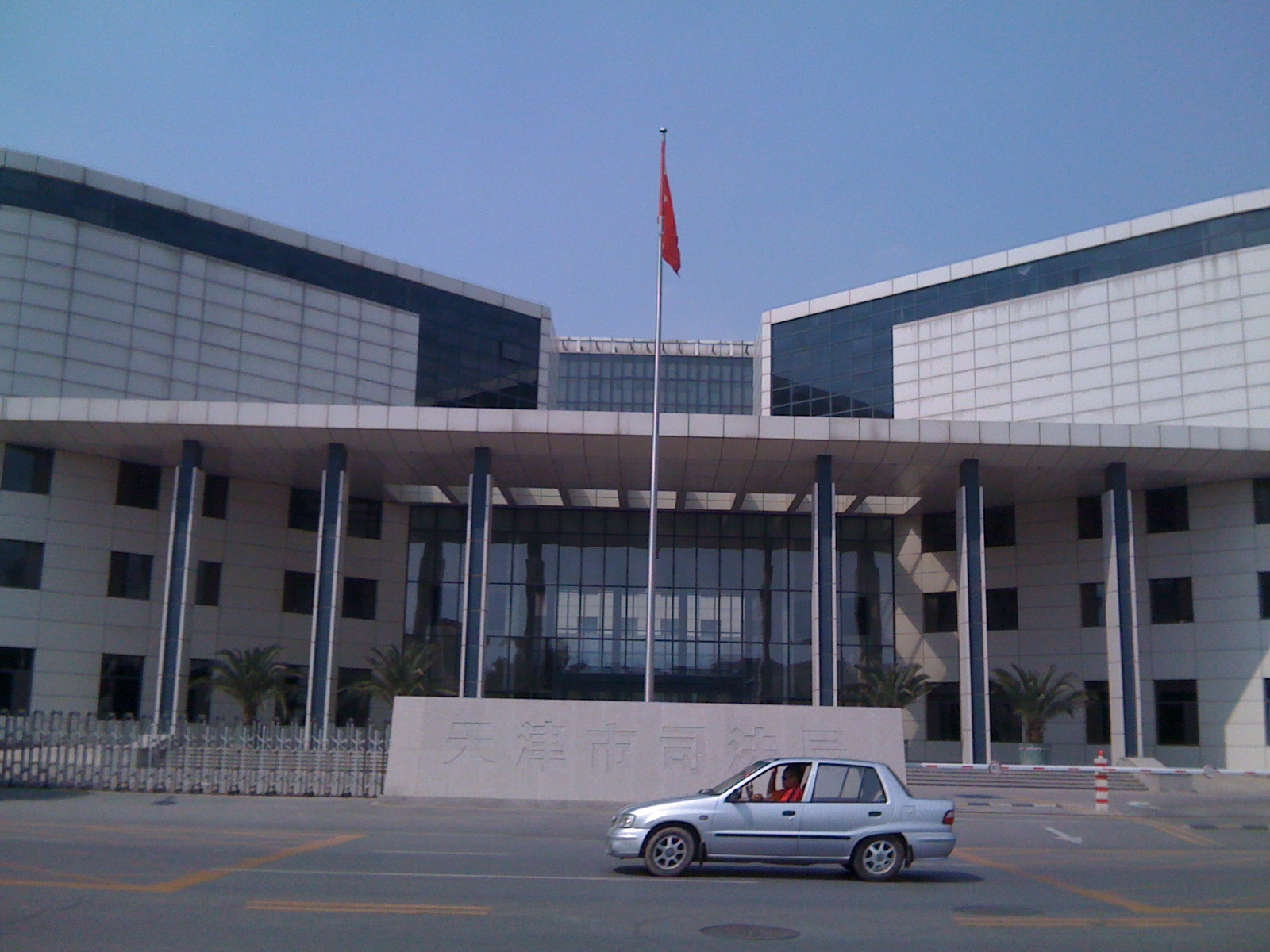
Headquarter of Tianjin City Justice Bureau, 2010

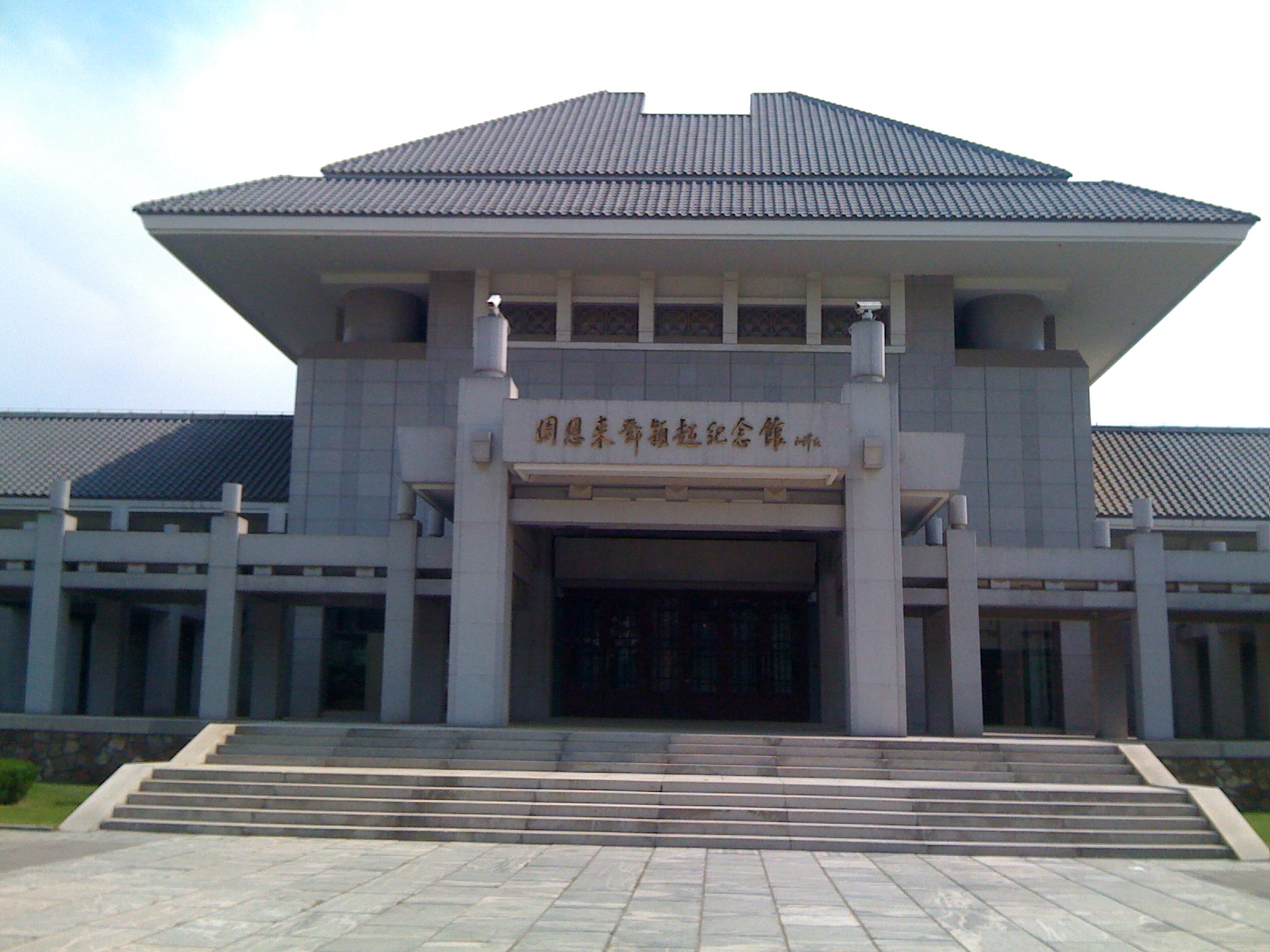
Zhou Enlai Museum on the eastern side of the subdistrict, 2010
