= Tianjin Zoo =

- Interactive map of Tianjin Zoo
- 39.0812567°N 117.1596408°E
- Date opened: 1980
- Location: Nankai District, Tianjin, China
- No. of animals: 3000
- No. of species: 200
- Website: www.tjzoo.com.cn

Tianjin Zoo (Chinese: 天津动物园; pinyin: Tiānjīn dòngwùyuán) is located in Nankai District, Tianjin, China, as the south-most part of the Water Park complex. It covers an area of 53.77 hectares (132.9 acres), which includes about 10.68 hectares (26.4 acres) of lakes. Construction began in 1975 and it was opened to the public on January 1, 1980. It houses approximately 3,000 animals of 200 species.

The zoo is divided into separate habitats for: monkeys/apes, bears, lions, pandas, songbirds, elephants, hippos/rhinos and amphibians.
