= Huayuan Subdistrict =

Huayuan Subdistrict 华苑街道
- Subdistrict
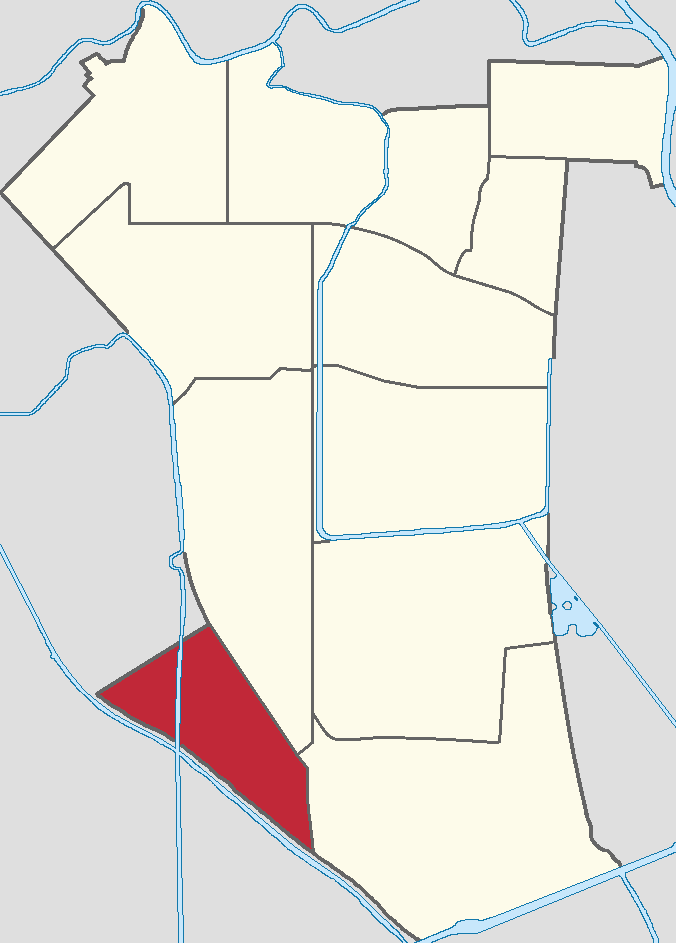
- Location of Huayuan Subdistrict in Nankai District

- Location within Tianjin Location within China
- Coordinates: 39°05′05″N 117°07′12″E
- Country: China
- Municipality: Tianjin
- District: Nankai
- Village-level Divisions: 12 communities

Area
  - Total: 2.08 km^{2} (0.80 sq mi)
- Elevation: 6 m (20 ft)

Population (2010)
  - Total: 52,948
  - Density: 25,500/km^{2} (65,900/sq mi)
- Time zone: UTC+8 (China Standard)
- Postal code: 300191
- Area code: 022

Huayuan Subdistrict (simplified Chinese: 华苑街道; traditional Chinese: 華苑街道; pinyin: Huáyuàn Jiēdào) is a subdistrict located on southwest side of Nankai District, Tianjin, China. It shares border with New Technology Industrial Park and Wangdingdi Subdistrict to the north, Tiyuzhongxin Subdistrict to the east, as well as Liqizhuang Subdistrict and Jingwu Town to the south. As of 2010, its total population was 52,948.

The subdistrict was established in 1998 as Huayuannan Subdistrict, and renamed to Huayuan Subdistrict a year later. Its name literally translates to "Chinese Garden".

== Geography ==
Chentaizi Paishui River passes through the western portion of the subdistrict.

== Administrative divisions ==
So far in 2021, Huayuan Subdistrict consists of 12 residential communities, all of which are listed in the table below:

Subdivision names	Name transliterations
日华里	Rihuali
碧华里	Bihuali
天华里	Tianhuali
安华里	Anhuali
居华里	Juhuali
莹华里	Yinghuali
程华里	Chenghuali
绮华里	Qihuali
长华里	Changhuali
地华里	Dihuali
久华里	Jiuhuali
竹华里	Zhuhuali
