= Nankai, Tianjin =

Nankai 南开区
- District
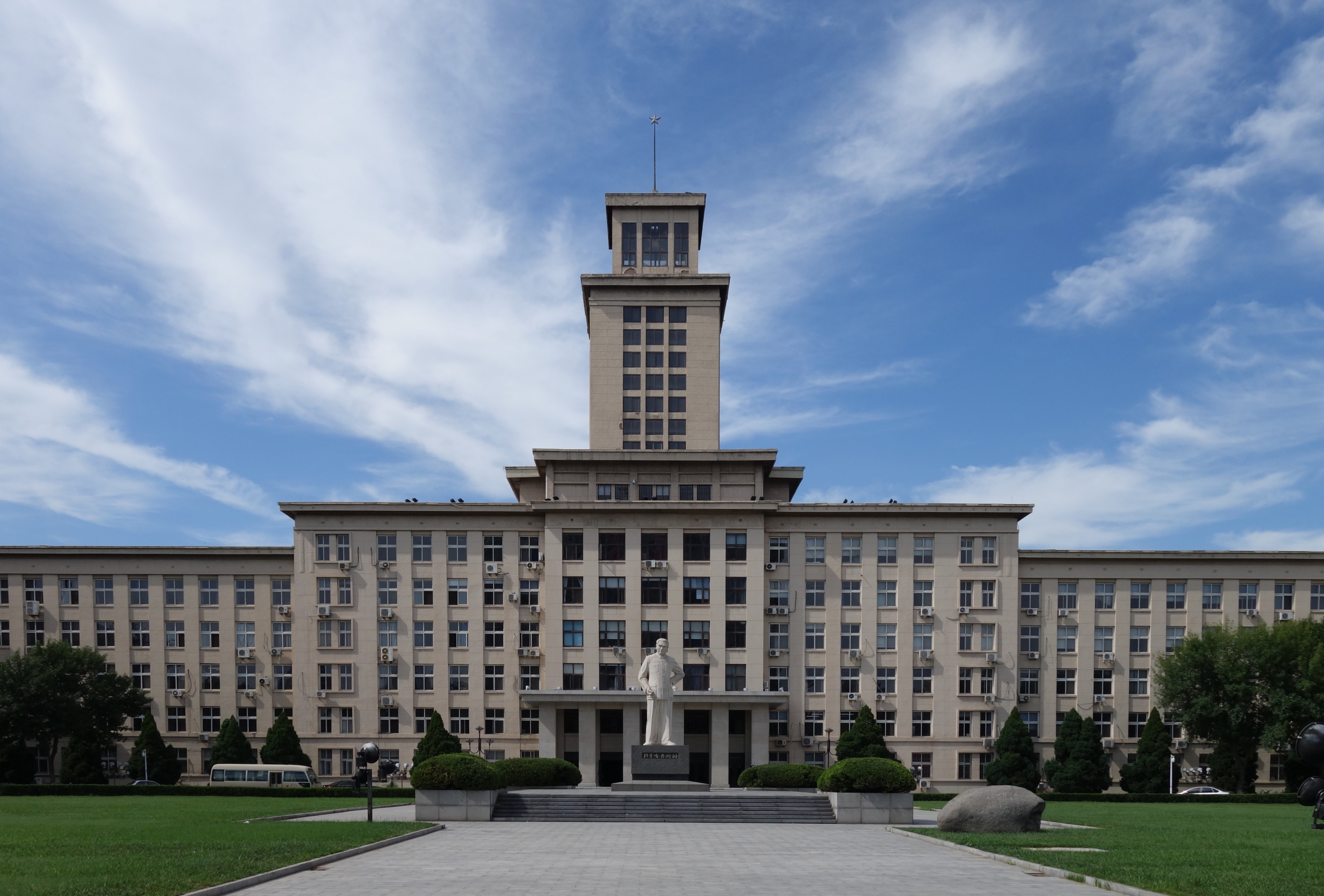
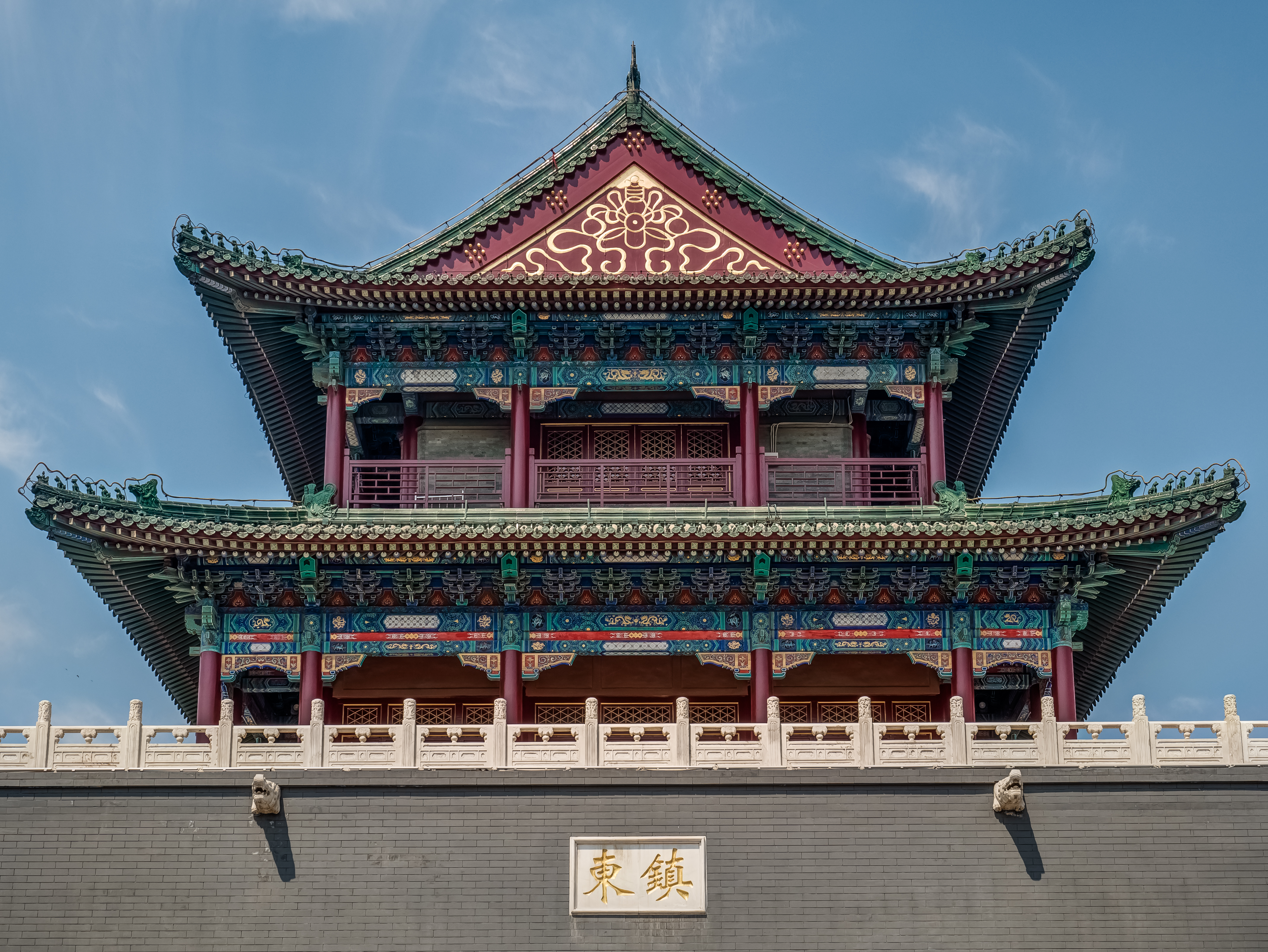
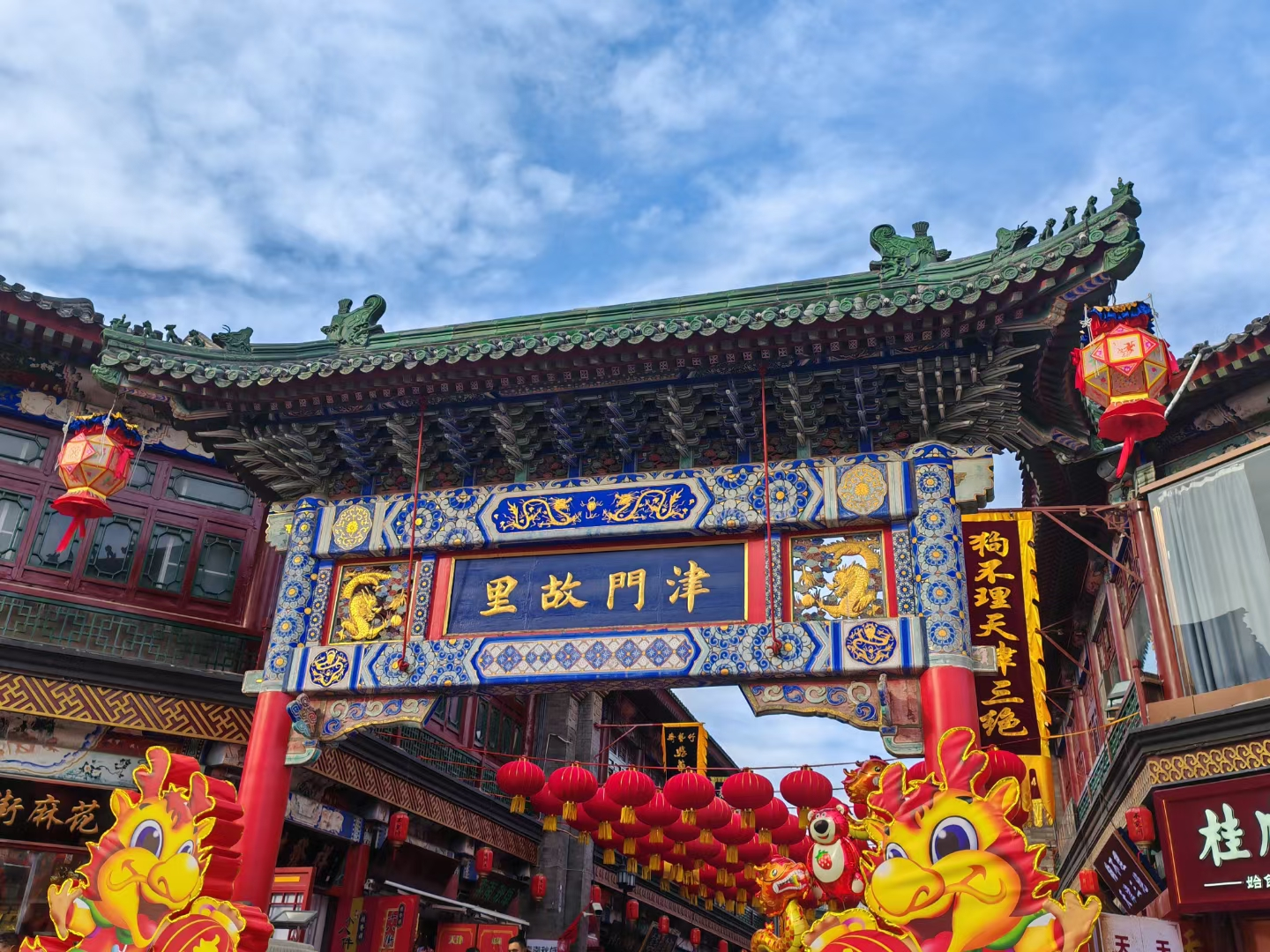
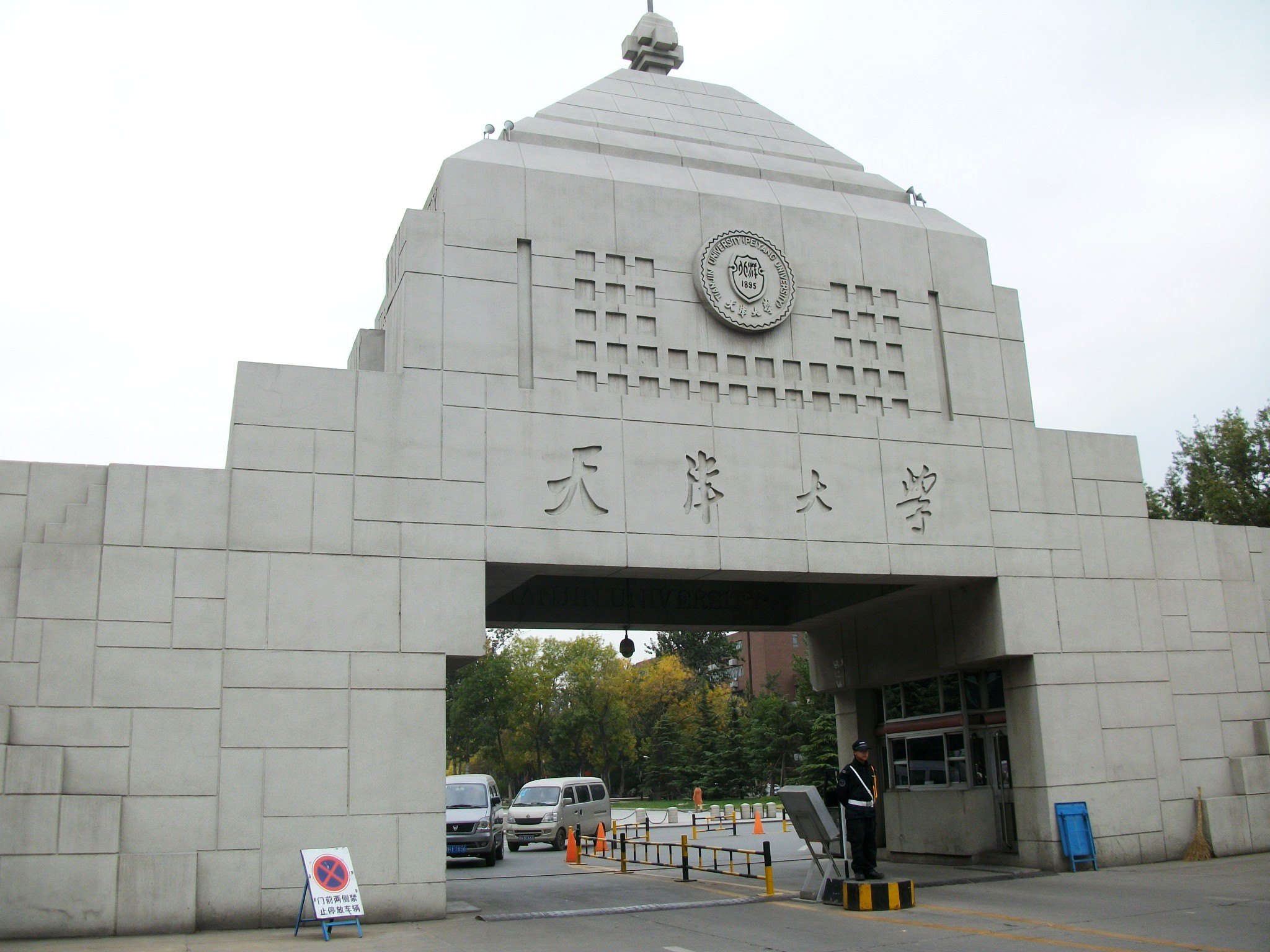
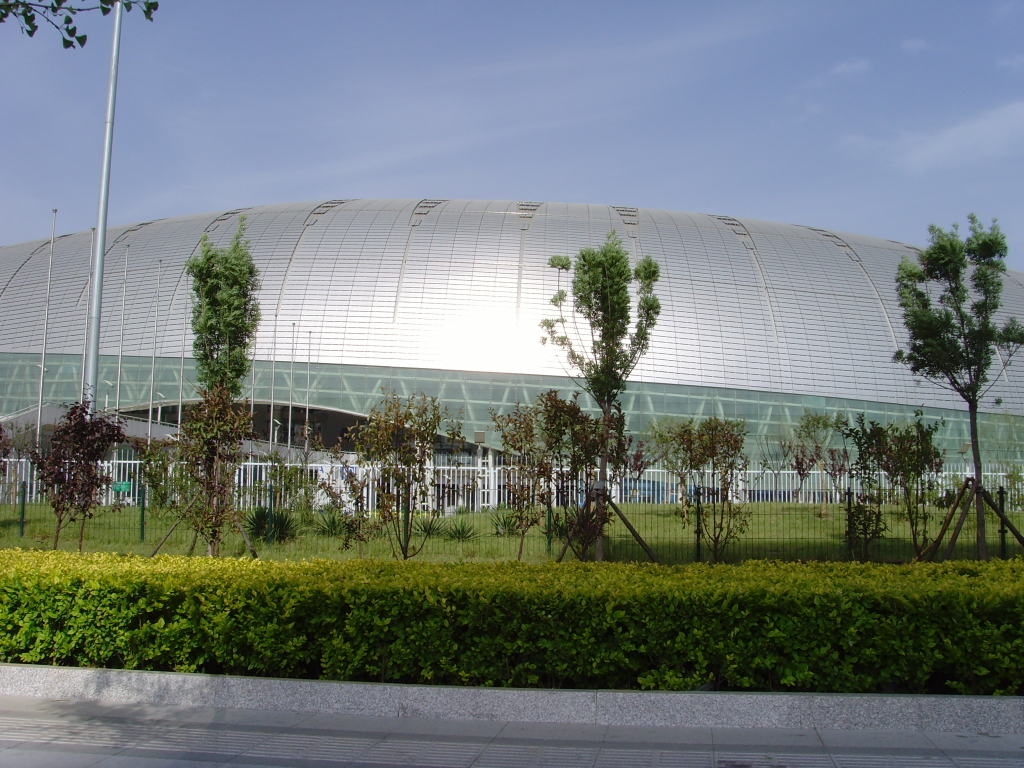
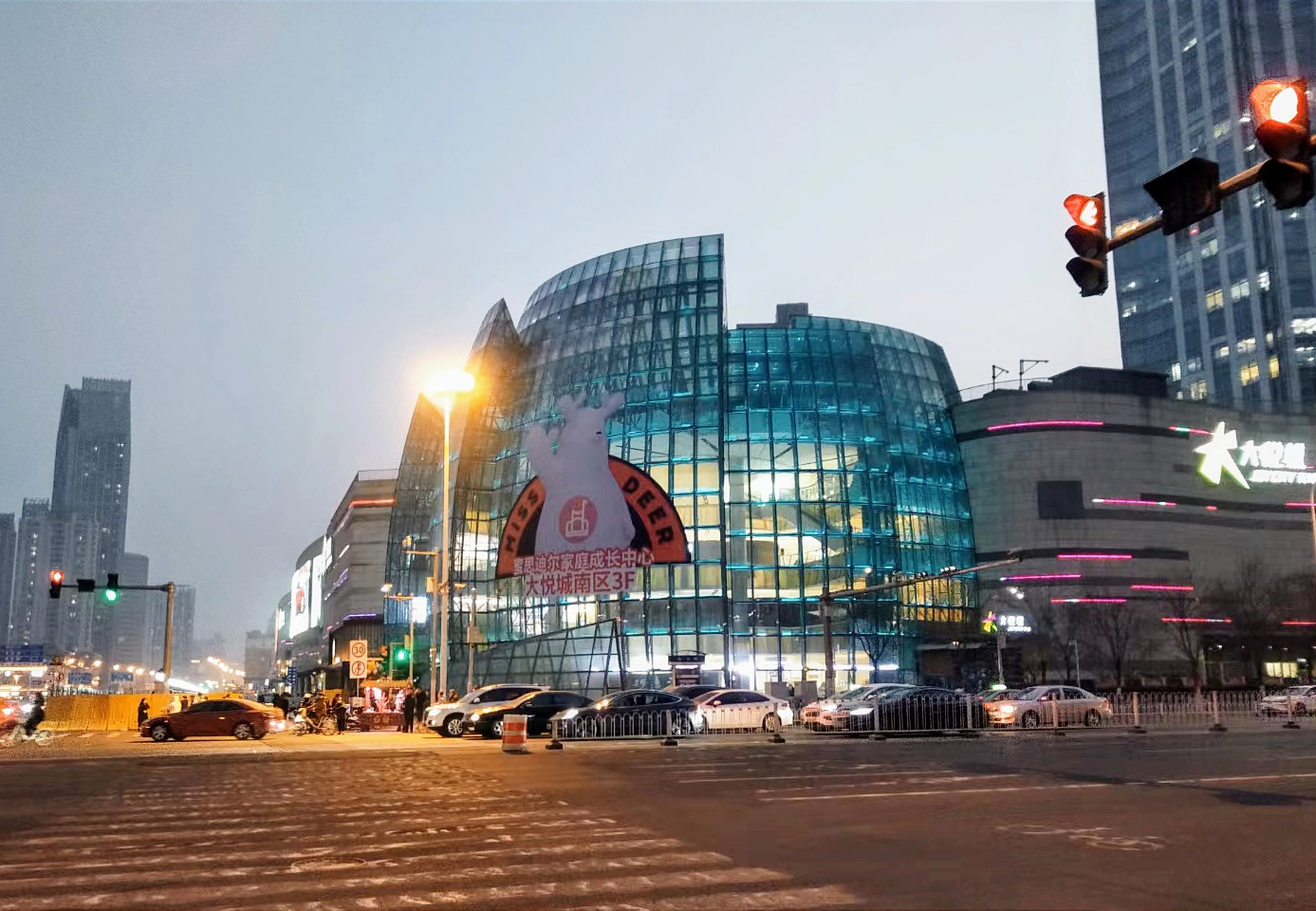
- Nankai University Drum Tower of Tianjin Ancient Culture Street Tianjin University Tianjin Olympic Centre Dayue City Mall
- Coordinates: 39°08′18″N 117°09′0″E
- Country: People's Republic of China
- Municipality: Tianjin
- Township-level divisions: 12 subdistricts

Area
  - Total: 40.64 km^{2} (15.69 sq mi)
- Elevation: 7 m (23 ft)

Population (2020 census)
  - Total: 917,106
  - Density: 22,570/km^{2} (58,450/sq mi)
- Time zone: UTC+8 (China Standard)
Tianjin district map
Subdivisions of Tianjin
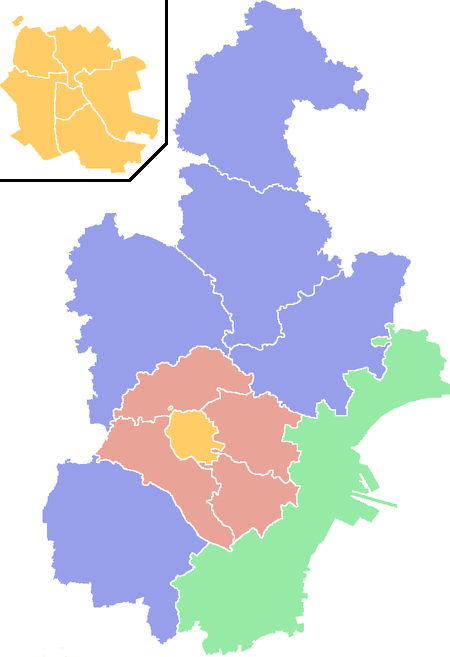
Core districts See inset
1	Heping
2	Hedong
3	Hexi
4	Nankai
5	Hebei
6	Hongqiao
Suburbs
7	Dongli
8	Xiqing
9	Jinnan
10	Beichen
Binhai and Rural
13	Binhai	14	Ninghe
11	Wuqing	15	Jinghai
12	Baodi	16	Ji Zhou
- Website: tjnk.gov.cn

Nankai District (Chinese: 南开区; pinyin: Nánkāi Qū) is a district of Tianjin, People's Republic of China. Nankai District borders the Hai River in the east and Chentangzhuang Railway in the west and south.

A number of important Tianjin landmarks lie in the district including the Tianjin Museum, Tianjin Radio and Television Tower, Tianjin Water Park, Tianjin Zoo and Tianjin Olympic Center Stadium. Nankai is also home to the city's most prestigious educational institutions including Tianjin University and Nankai University. The Tianjin New Technology Industrial Area, a 12 square km precinct, is also located in Nankai.

== History ==
Historically, northern parts of Nankai District were located inside the walled city of Tianjin. The Tianfei Palace or Palace of the Queen of Heaven of the Yuan Dynasty was built in north-eastern Nankai in the year 1326. In the Ming Dynasty, the heart of the city of Tianjin was set up in Nankai. Nankai became part of the military garrisons during the Ming and Qing Dynasties and the city wall served as a major defense system against foreign invasion in the late 19th century.

== Administrative divisions ==
There are 12 subdistricts in the district:

Name	Chinese (S)	Hanyu Pinyin	Population (2010)	Area (km^{2})
Changhong Subdistrict	长虹街道	Chánghóng Jiēdào	73,346	2.635
Gulou Subdistrict	鼓楼街道	Gǔlóu Jiēdào	28,788	2.117
Xingnan Subdistrict	兴南街道	Xìngnán Jiēdào	43,744	1.7
Guangkai Subdistrict	广开街道	Guǎngkāi Jiēdào	73,299	1.7
Wanxing Subdistrict	万兴街道	Wànxìng Jiēdào	140,684	3.54
Xuefu Subdistrict	学府街道	Xuéfǔ Jiēdào	103,319	4.7
Xiangyang Road Subdistrict	向阳路街道	Xiàngyánglù Jiēdào	145,263	3.887
Jialing Avenue Subdistrict	嘉陵道街道	Jiālíngdào Jiēdào	102,405	3.672
Wangdingdi Subdistrict	王顶堤街道	Wángdǐngdī Jiēdào	122,599	5.016
Shuishanggongyuan Subdistrict	水上公园街道	Shuǐshànggōngyuán Jiēdào	64,853	5.633
Tiyuzhongxin Subdistrict	体育中心街道	Tǐyùzhōngxīn Jiēdào	66,948	5.26
Huayuan Subdistrict	华苑街道	Huáyuàn Jiēdào	52,948	1.67

== Geography ==
Nankai District is located in the south-west corner of the urban Tianjin, bordered by Hongqiao District to the north, Hebei and Heping Districts to the north-east, Hexi District to the east and Xiqing District to the south-west. It occupies an area of 40.64 square kilometres (15.69 sq mi). The natural topography is characterised by higher elevation in the north of the district and a lower elevation in the south, with the average altitude being 3 metres.

== Demographics ==
Nankai District has been one of the fastest growing districts in Tianjin since the formation of the People's Republic of China. The population was 220,000 in 1949. In 2006, the population was 925,000 and the density was 19621/km^{2} (50818/sq. mi.).

The rate of population growth has been negative since 1993 with the birth rate averaging 3.97% and death rate registering 4.56% in 2005.

The majority of people in Nankai District are Han Chinese. Small populations of ethnic minorities such as the Hui, Manchu and Mongol peoples also exist.

== Transportation ==
=== Metro ===
Nankai is currently served by three metro lines operated by Tianjin Metro:

- Line 1 - Haiguangsi, Erweilu, Xi'nanjiao
- Line 2 - Bianxing, Jieyuanxidao, Xianyanglu, Changhonggongyuan, Guangkaisimalu, Xi'nanjiao, Gulou, Dongnanjiao
- Line 3 - Huayuan, Wangdingdi, Hongqinanlu, Zhoudengji'nianguan, Tianta

== Education ==
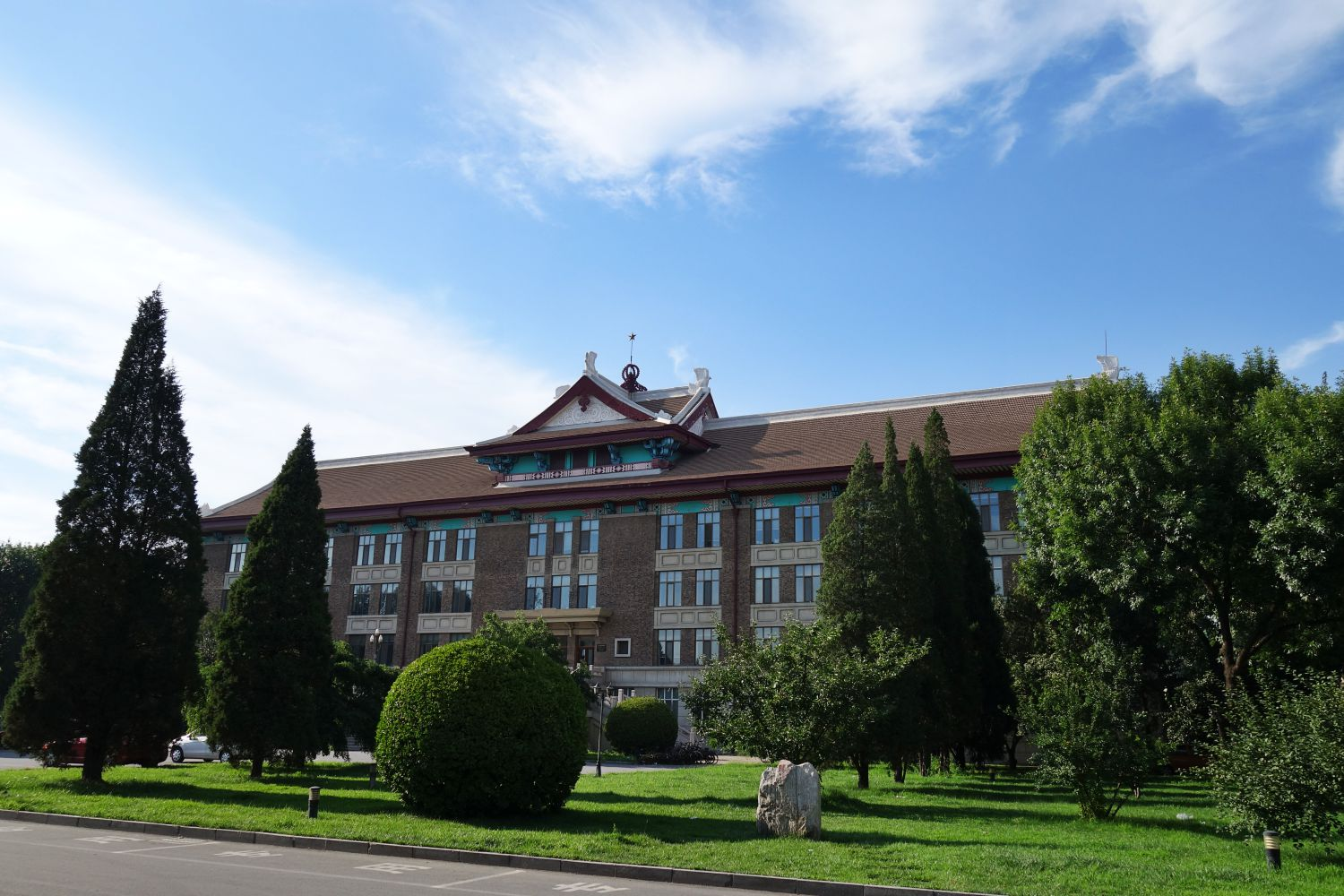
Tianjin University since 1895

- Tianjin University
- Nankai University

== Parks ==
- Tianjin Zoo (天津动物园)
- Tianjin Water Park (天津水上公园)
- Changhong Park (长虹公园)
