= Xiangyang Road Subdistrict =

Xiangyang Road Subdistrict 向阳路街道
- Subdistrict
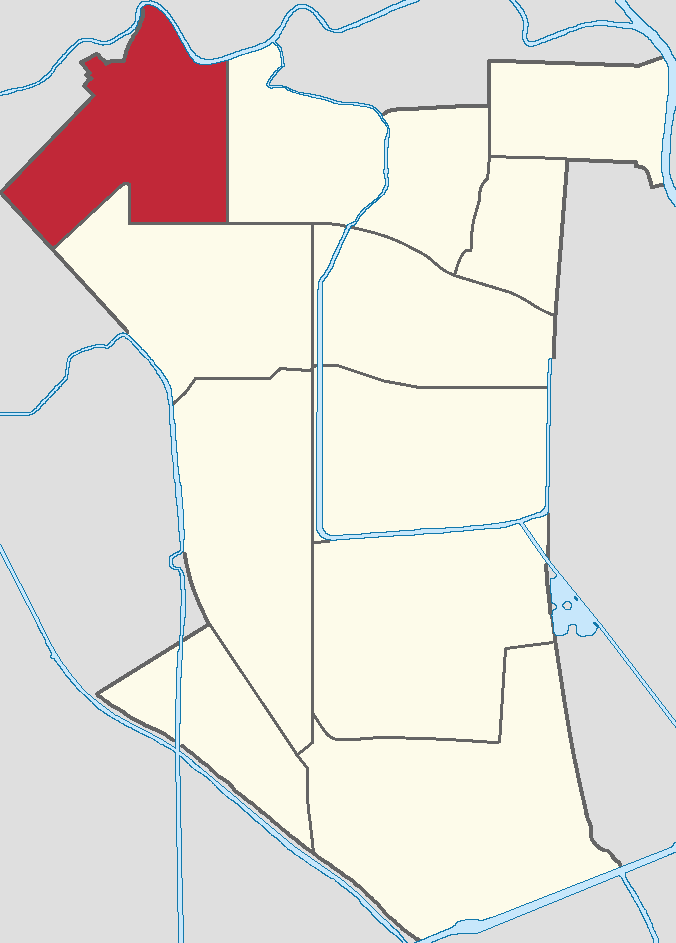
- Location in Nankai District

- Location within Tianjin Location within China
- Coordinates: 39°08′16″N 117°07′29″E
- Country: China
- Municipality: Tianjin
- District: Nankai
- Village-level Divisions: 16 communities

Area
  - Total: 3.73 km^{2} (1.44 sq mi)
- Elevation: 7 m (23 ft)

Population (2010)
  - Total: 145,263
  - Density: 38,900/km^{2} (101,000/sq mi)
- Time zone: UTC+8 (China Standard)
- Postal code: 300111
- Area code: 022

Xiangyang Road Subdistrict (simplified Chinese: 向阳路街道; traditional Chinese: 向陽路街道; pinyin: Xiàngyánglù Jiēdào) is a subdistrict situated on the northwestern corner of Nankai District, Tianjin, China. It borders Xiyingmen and Shaogongzhuang Subdistricts in the north, Changhong Subdistrict in the east, Jialing Avenue Subdistrict in the south, and Zhongbei Town in the west. As of 2010, 145,263 residents were counted for this su bdistrict.

The subdistrict was formed in 1975 from part of Xiyingmenwai Subdistrict, and was named after Xiangyang Road (Chinese: 向阳路; lit. 'Facing Sun Road') under its administration in 1978.

== Geography ==
Xiangyang Road subdistrict situates on the south of Nanyun River. Part of Chentangzhuang Branch Railway passes through the subdistrict.

== Administrative divisions ==
Below is a list of the 16 residential communities under Xiangyang Road Subdistrict by the end of 2021:

Subdivision names	Name transliterations
向阳路	Xiangyanglu
云阳里	Yunyangli
华阳里	Huayangli
战备楼	Zhanbeilou
延安楼	Yan'anlou
芥园中里	Jieyuan Zhongli
冶金里	Yejinli
留园里	Liuyuanli
集园里	Jiyuanli
昔阳里	Xiyangli
延长里	Yanchangli
宜君里	Yijunli
大园新居	Dayuan Xinju
瑞湾花园	Ruiwan Huayuan
南泥湾路	Nan Niwanlu
南开区新南马路五金城商圈	Nankaiqu Xin Nanmalu Wujincheng Shangquan
