= Tianjin Water Park =

Park in Tianjin, China

Coordinates: 39.0863201°N 117.1601773°E

- Interactive map of Tianjin Water Park
- Type: Urban park
- Location: Tianjin, China
- Area: 126.71 ha (313.1 acres)
- Created: 1951
- Status: Open all year

The Tianjin Water Park (simplified Chinese: 天津水上公园; traditional Chinese: 天津水上公園; pinyin: Tiānjīn Shuǐshàng Gōngyuán) is the largest urban park and recreation area in Tianjin, China. The park was formally established in 1951, covering an area of 126.71 hectares. The park is one of Tianjin's leading tourist attractions, and was officially rated a AAAA-level tourist attraction in 2004.

== History ==
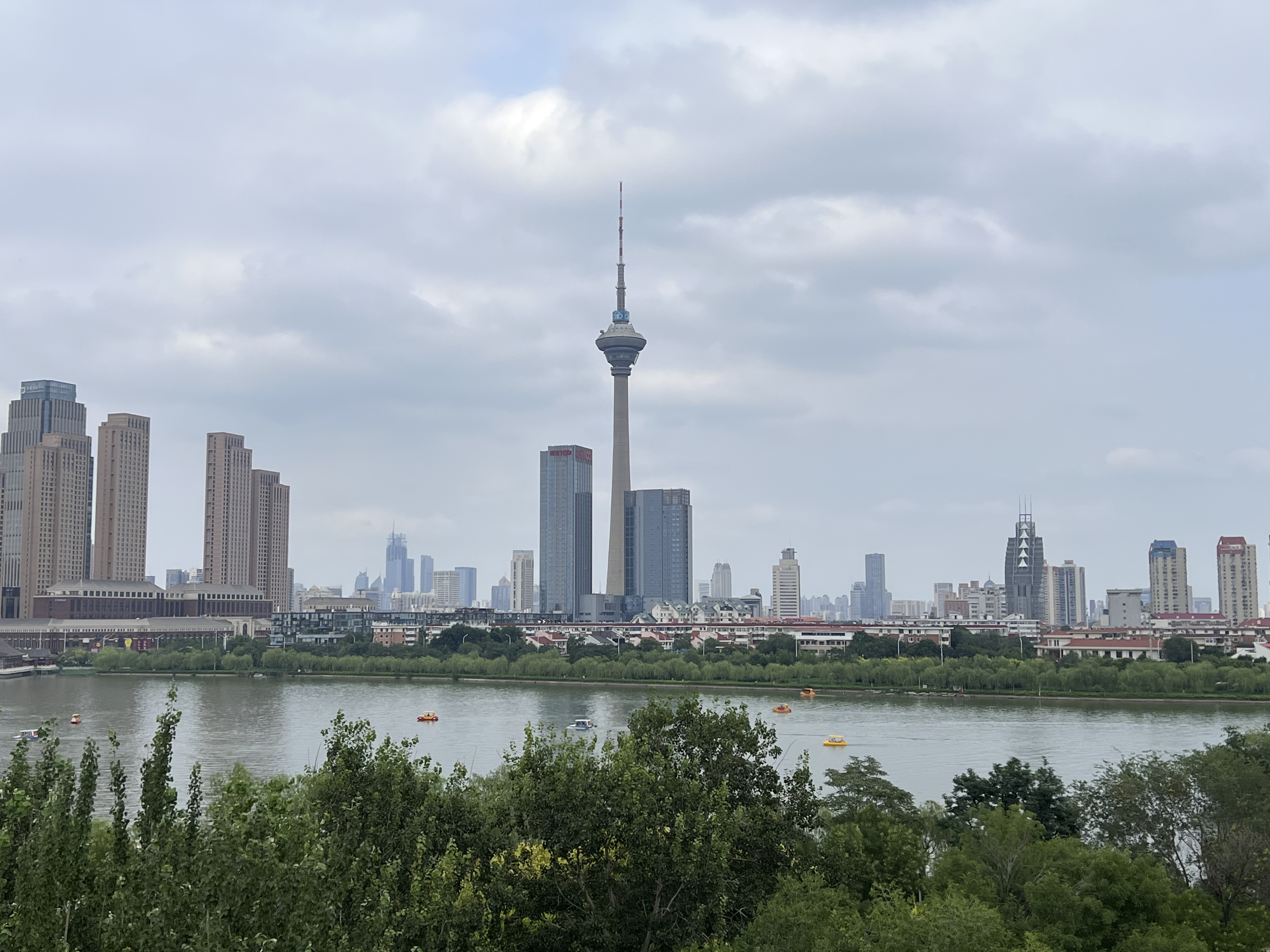
Tianjin Water Park East Lake

The Tianjin Water Park formerly known as "Green Dragon Pond" (青龙潭) prior to its official establishment. Its history can be traced back first century AD. Historically, the site was known for its lush vegetation and natural ecosystems, particular in summer and autumn.

With the establishment of Beiyang University and Nankai University at the turn of the 19th century, the waterways of the park became popular for swimming among academic staff and students during the hot summer months.

The ground-breaking for the Tianjin Water Park occurred on 26 August 1950 and it was officially opened July 1, 1951 to visitors.

In 1986, the Tianjin Municipal Garden and the Forestry Administration Bureau built Bibozhuang, a 15,000-square-metre "ancient-style" garden. Twenty years later, a private golf-driving range under construction in Bibozhuang became a source of controversy among local residents.

== Park layout ==
The Tianjin Water Park consists of nine islands (Islands 1 - 9) and three lakes (East Lake, West Lake and South Lake). Surrounding the waterways are pathways, pagodas and gardens. The gardens showcase both Chinese and foreign architectural styles.

== Activities ==
The recreation area of the Tianjin Park has one of the city's tallest Ferris wheels. Visitors are also encouraged to travel on the lakes via rowing boats and high speed water shuttles. The park changes its theme according to season, for example, during spring there is the Tulip Show, and in autumn there is the Chrysanthemum Show.
