= Qingguang =

Town in Tianjin, China

Qingguang Town 青光镇
- Town
- Qingguang Bridge at the border of Fenyuan and Wuri, 2020

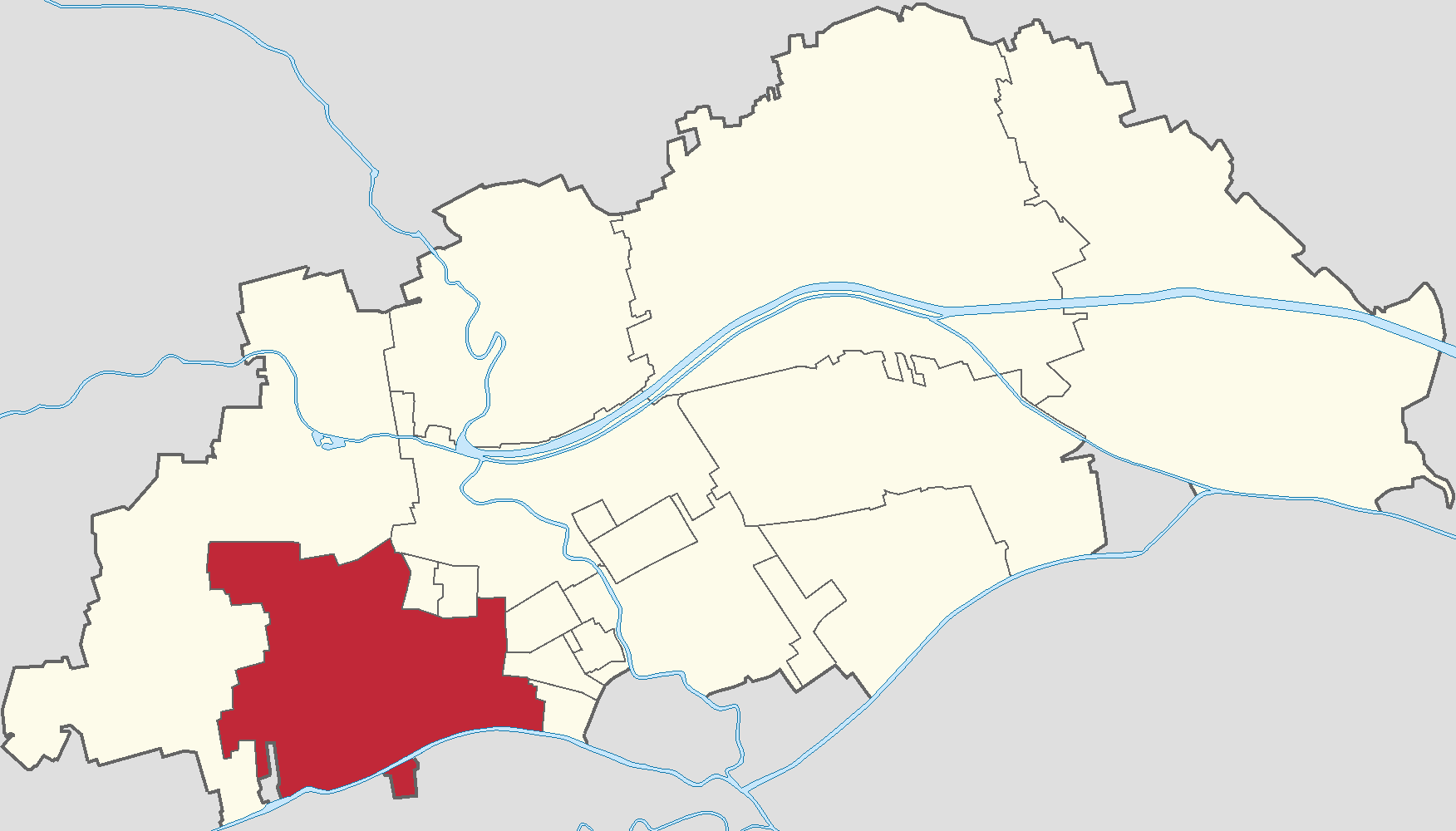
- Location in Beichen District

- Location within Tianjin Location within China
- Coordinates: 39°11′48″N 117°03′17″E
- Country: China
- Municipality: Tianjin
- District: Beichen
- Village-level Divisions: 1 communities 6 villages

Area
  - Total: 39.67 km^{2} (15.32 sq mi)
- Elevation: 8 m (26 ft)

Population (2010)
  - Total: 43,280
  - Density: 1,091/km^{2} (2,826/sq mi)
- Time zone: UTC+8 (CST)
- Postal code: 300401
- Area code: 022

Qingguang Town (simplified Chinese: 青光镇; traditional Chinese: 青光鎮; pinyin: Qīngguāng Zhèn) is a town located on the southwestern part of Beichen District, Tianjin, China. It shares border with Shuangkou Town to the north and west, Beicang Town to the north, Qingyuan and Guangyuan Subdistricts to the northeast, Ruijing and Jiarongli Subdistricts to the east, Tianmu Town and Xiyingmen Subdistrict to the southeast, and Yangliuqing Town to the south. In the year 2010, the town has a total population of 43,280.

Its name Qingguang (Chinese: 青光; lit. 'Blue Light') refers to Qingguang Village, the administrative center of the town.

== Geography ==
Qingguang Town is located on the north of Ziya River. Wujing Road (S245) passes through this town.

== History ==
History of Qingguang Town
Years	Status	Part of
1953 - 1958	Qingguang Township Tieguodian Township	Beijiao District, Tianjin
1958 - 1959	Qingguang Township	Hongqiao District, Tianjin
1959 - 1961	Qingguang People's Commune	Hongqiao District, Tianjin
1961 - 1966	Qingguang People's Commune	Beijiao District, Tianjin
1966 - 1968	Hongxing People's Commune	Beijiao District, Tianjin
1968 - 1983	Qingguang People's Commune	Beijiao District, Tianjin
1983 - 1992	Qingguang Township	Beijiao District, Tianjin
1992 - 1995	Qingguang Township	Beichen District, Tianjin
1995 - present	Qingguang Town	Beichen District, Tianjin

== Administrative divisions ==
In the year 2022, Qingguang Town has 7 subdivisions, with 1 residential community and 6 villages:

=== Community ===
- Hongguang Nongchang (红光农场)

=== Villages ===
- Qingguang Cun (青光村)
- Hanjiashu (韩家墅)
- Yangjiazui (杨家嘴)
- Liujia Matou (刘家码头)
- Lijia Fangzi (李家房子)
- Tieguodian (铁锅店)

== See also ==
- List of township-level divisions of Tianjin
