= Shuangkou =

Town in Tianjin, China

Shuangkou Town 双口镇
- Town
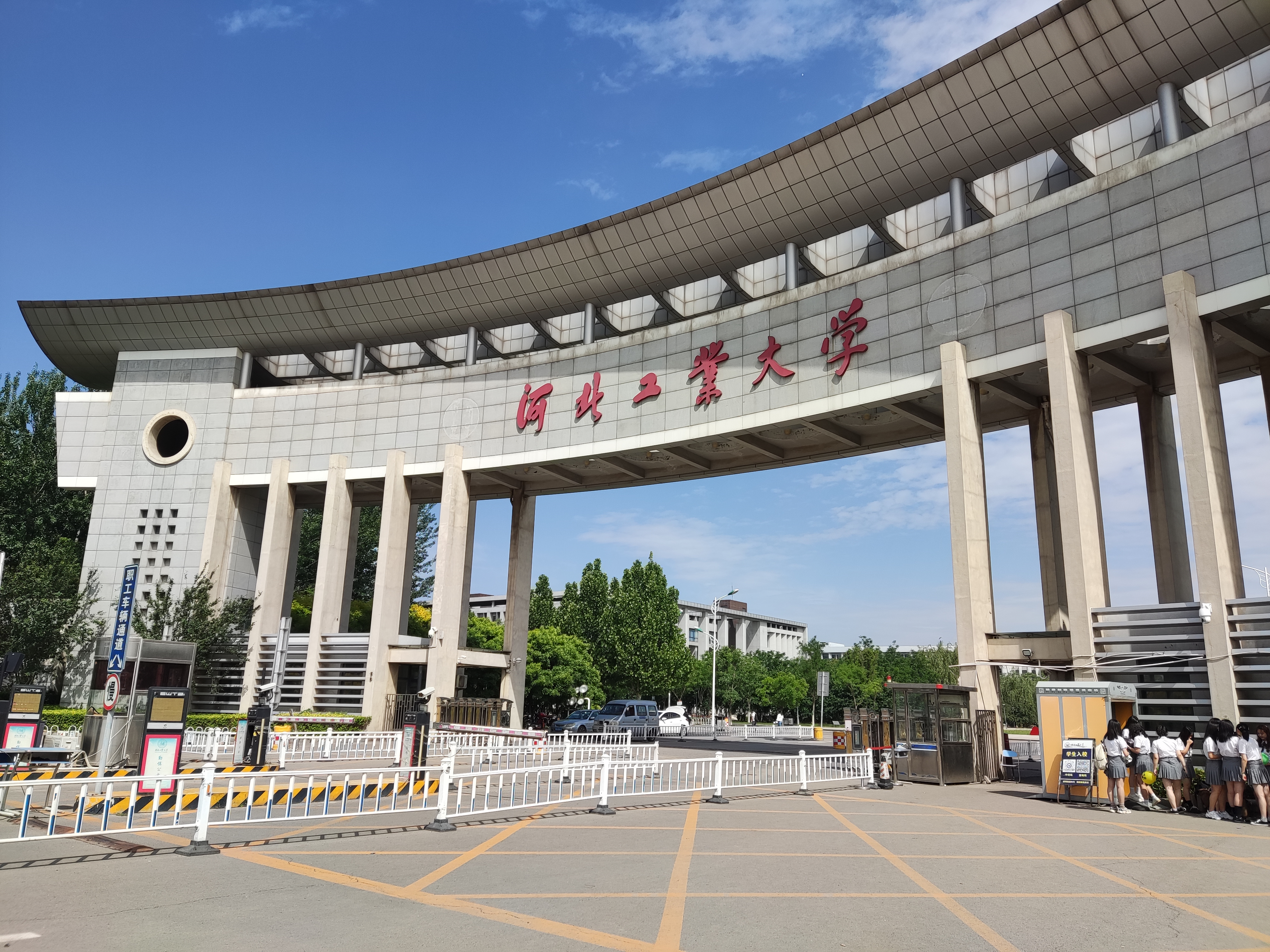
- Hebei University of Technology on the northeast of the town

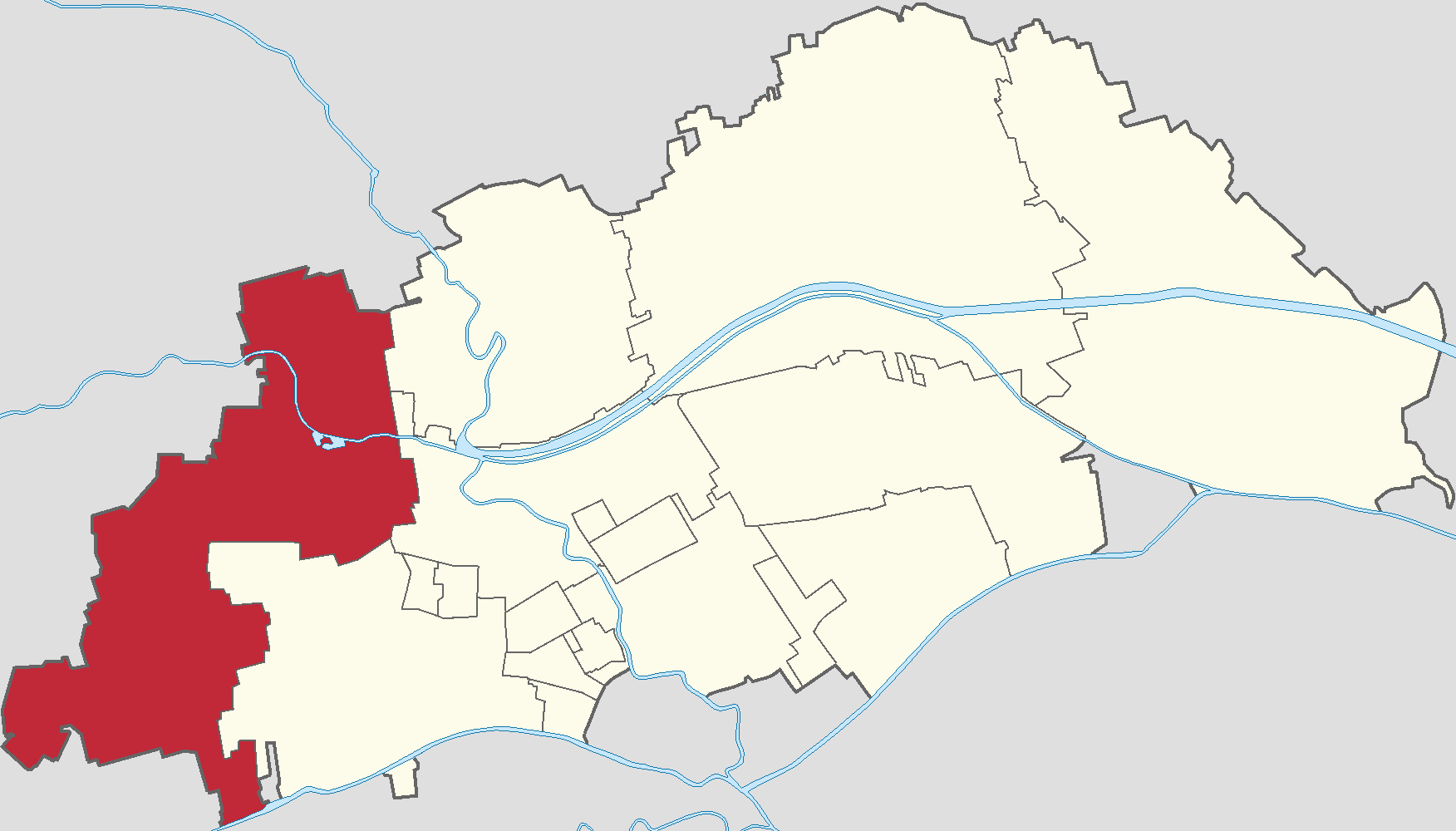
- Location in Beichen District

- Location within Tianjin Location within China
- Coordinates: 39°13′35″N 117°01′49″E
- Country: China
- Municipality: Tianjin
- District: Beichen
- Village-level Divisions: 21 villages

Area
  - Total: 67.73 km^{2} (26.15 sq mi)
- Elevation: 9 m (30 ft)

Population (2010)
  - Total: 63,999
  - Density: 944.9/km^{2} (2,447/sq mi)
- Time zone: UTC+8 (CST)
- Postal code: 300401
- Area code: 022

Shuangkou Town (simplified Chinese: 双口镇; traditional Chinese: 雙口鎮; pinyin: Shuāngkǒu Zhèn) is a town situated on the western side of Beichen District, Tianjin, China. It is located in the south of Huangzhuang Subdistrict and Chenju Town, southwest of Shuangjie and Beicang Towns, west of Qingguang Town, north of Yangliuqing Town, as well as east of Wangqingtuo and Chagugang Towns. According to the 2010 Chinese Census, it has a population of 63,999.

The name Shuangkou (Chinese: 双口; lit. 'Two Mouths') came into existence in the Qing Dynasty, and was given for the settlement's location at the intersection of two waterways: Zhujiadian and Yedian.

== Geography ==
Shuangkou Town is located on the northern bank of Ziya River, with Zhonghong Ancient Channel passing through the town. The town is connected to the National Highway 112.

== History ==
Timetable of Shuangkou Town
Time	Status	Under
Ming Dynasty		Wuqing County
Qing Dynasty		Tianjin County, Shuntian Prefecture
1913 - 1928		Tianjin County, Zhili
1928 - 1946		Tianjin County, Hebei
1946 - 1950		3rd District, Tianjin County, Hebei
1950 - 1952		4th District, Tianjin County, Hebei
1952 - 1953		4th District, Tianjin County, Tianjin
1953 - 1958	Shuangkou Township; Hetou Township	Beijiao District, Tianjin
1958 - 1961	Administered by Xingfu People's Commune	Hongqiao District, Tianjin
1961 - 1963	Shuangkou People's Commune; Qingguang People's Commune	Beijiao District, Tianjin
1963 - 1983	Shuangkou People's Commune; Chafangzi People's Commune	Beijiao District, Tianjin
1983 - 1985	Shuangkou Township; Chafangzi Township	Beijiao District, Tianjin
1985 - 1992	Shuangkou Township; Shanghetou Township	Beijiao District, Tianjin
1992 - 1995	Shuangkou Township; Shanghetou Township	Beichen District, Tianjin
1995 - 1999	Shuangkou Town; Shanghetou Township	Beichen District, Tianjin
1999 - 2001	Shuangkou Town; Shanghetou Town	Beichen District, Tianjin
2001 - present	Shuangkou Town	Beichen District, Tianjin

== Administrative divisions ==
As of 2022, Shuangkou Town covers these 21 villages:

- Shuangkou Yicun (双口一村)
- Shuangkou Ercun (双口二村)
- Shuangkou Sancun (双口三村)
- Anguang (安光)
- Houbao (后堡)
- Qian Dingzhuang (前丁庄)
- Hou Dingzhuang (后丁庄)
- Ping'an Zhuang (平安庄)
- Shang Hetou (上河头)
- Zhong Hetou (中河头)
- Xia Hetou (下河头)
- Dongdi Cun (东堤村)
- Yanghe (杨河)
- Chafangzi (岔房子)
- Xianhe Yicun (线河一村)
- Xianhe Ercun (线河二村)
- Shuanghe (双河)
- Qianbao (前堡)
- Xubao (徐堡)
- Hebao (郝堡)
- Zhaoquan (赵圈)

== See also ==
- List of township-level divisions of Tianjin
