= Xiaodian, Tianjin =

Town in Tianjin, China

Xiaodian Town 小淀镇
- Town
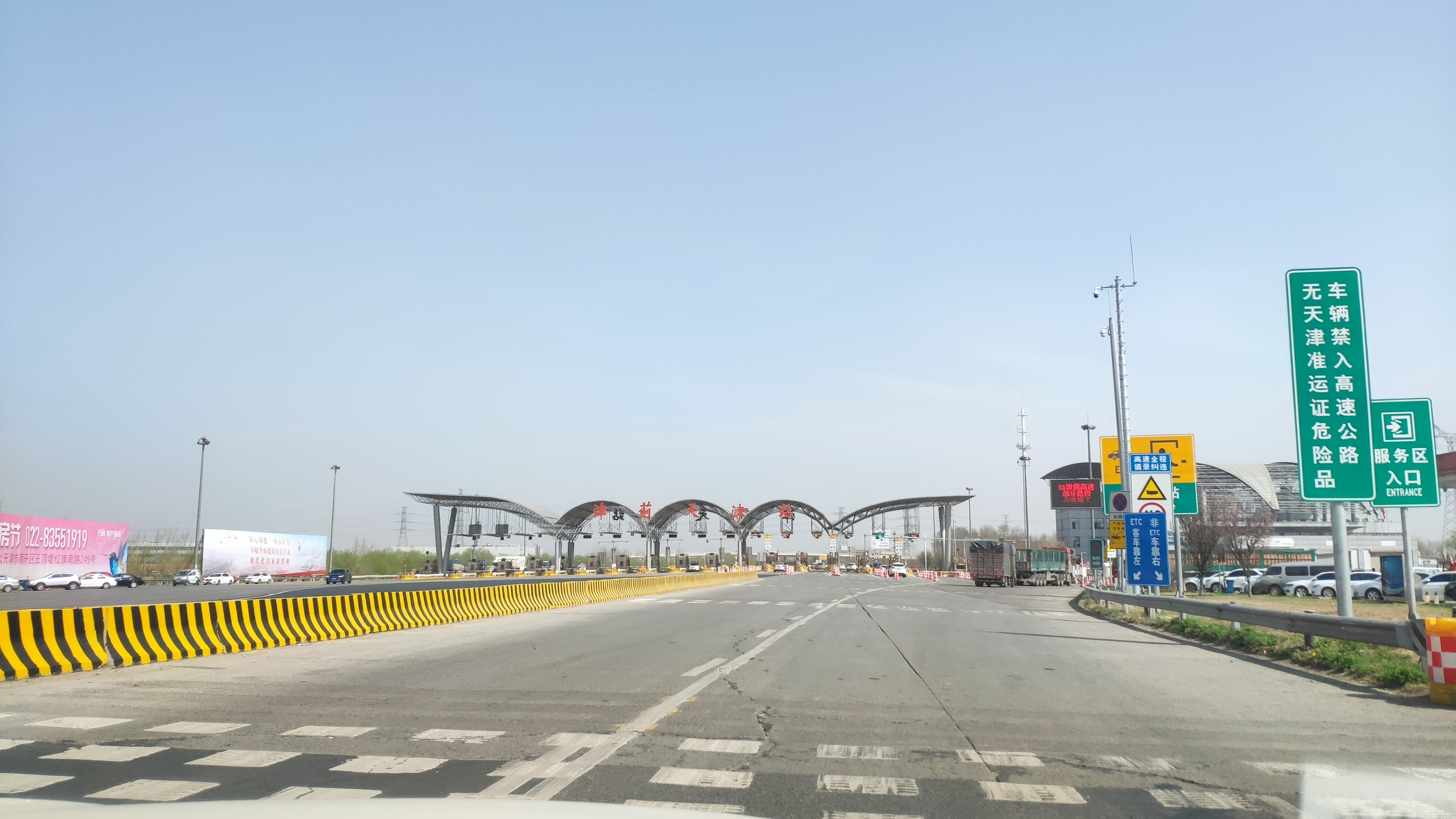
- Toll gate of Jinji Expressway on the southeast of the town, 2021

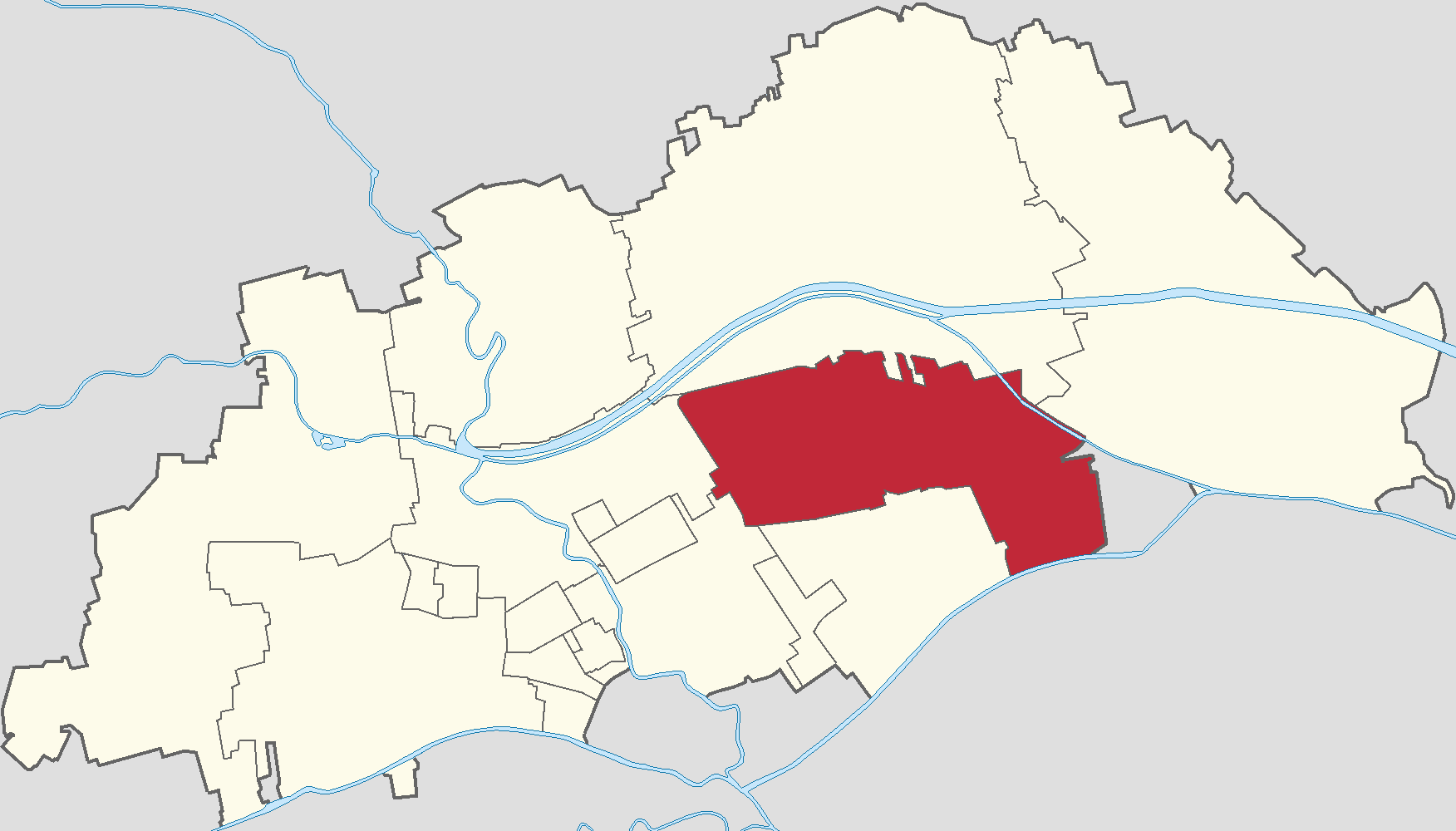
- Location in Beichen District

- Location within Tianjin Location within China
- Coordinates: 39°14′48″N 117°13′10″E
- Country: China
- Municipality: Tianjin
- District: Beichen
- Village-level Divisions: 6 communities 5 villages

Area
  - Total: 35.52 km^{2} (13.71 sq mi)
- Elevation: 4 m (13 ft)

Population (2010)
  - Total: 34,512
  - Density: 971.6/km^{2} (2,516/sq mi)
- Time zone: UTC+8 (CST)
- Postal code: 300404
- Area code: 022

Xiaodian Town (simplified Chinese: 小淀镇; traditional Chinese: 小淀鎮; pinyin: Xiǎodiàn Zhèn) is a town located on the southern portion of Beichen District, Tianjin, China. It borders Dazhangzhuang Town to the north, Xiditou Town and Jinzhong Subdistrict to the east, Yixingbu Town to the south, as well as Tianmu and Beicang Towns to the west. It has a population of 34,512 as of 2010.

Its name Xiaodian (Chinese: 小淀; lit. 'Small Dreg') comes from Xiaodian Village, where the seat of the town government is located.

== Geography ==
Xiaodian Town is bounded by Ziya River to the south and Jinzhong River to the east. National Highway 112 passes through it.

== History ==
History of Xiaodian Town
Years	Status	Belong to
1948 - 1950		9th District, Tianjin
1950 - 1953		3rd District, Tianjin
1953 - 1956	Xiaodian Township	Jinbeijiao District, Tianjin
1956 - 1958	Part of Hongguang Agricultural Collective	Beijiao District, Tianjin
1958 - 1961	Xingdian People's Commune	Hebei District, Tianjin
1961 - 1983	Xiaodian People's Commune	Beijiao District, Tianjin
1983 - 1992	Xiaodian Township	Beijiao District, Tianjin
1992 - 1995	Xiaodian Township	Beichen District, Tianjin
1995 - present	Xiaodian Town	Beichen District, Tianjin

== Administrative divisions ==
As of 2022, Xiaodian Town consists of 11 subdivisions, including the following 6 residential communities and 5 villages:

=== Community ===
- Xiuhe Yuan (秀河园)
- Jiayang Huayuan (嘉阳花园)
- Lanhe Jiayuan (兰禾嘉苑)
- Rongchen Huayuan (荣辰花园)
- Biyue Yuan (碧樾园)
- Qingyue Yuan (青樾园)

=== Villages ===
- Xiaodian Cun (小淀村)
- Liu'an Zhuang (刘安庄)
- Xiaohe Zhuang (小贺庄)
- Zhao Zhuang (赵庄)
- Wenjia Fangzi (温家房子)

== See also ==
- List of township-level divisions of Tianjin
