= Tianmu =

Tianmu may refer to the following in mainland China or Taiwan:

- Tianmu, Shilin District (天母), a neighbourhood of Shilin District, Taipei, Taiwan
- Tianmu Mountain (天目山) in Lin'an City, Zhejiang, China - the origin of Japanese Tenmoku pottery
- Tianmu, Tianjin (天穆镇), a town in Beichen District, Tianjin, China
