= Xiditou =

Town in Tianjin, China

Xiditou Town 西堤头镇
- Town
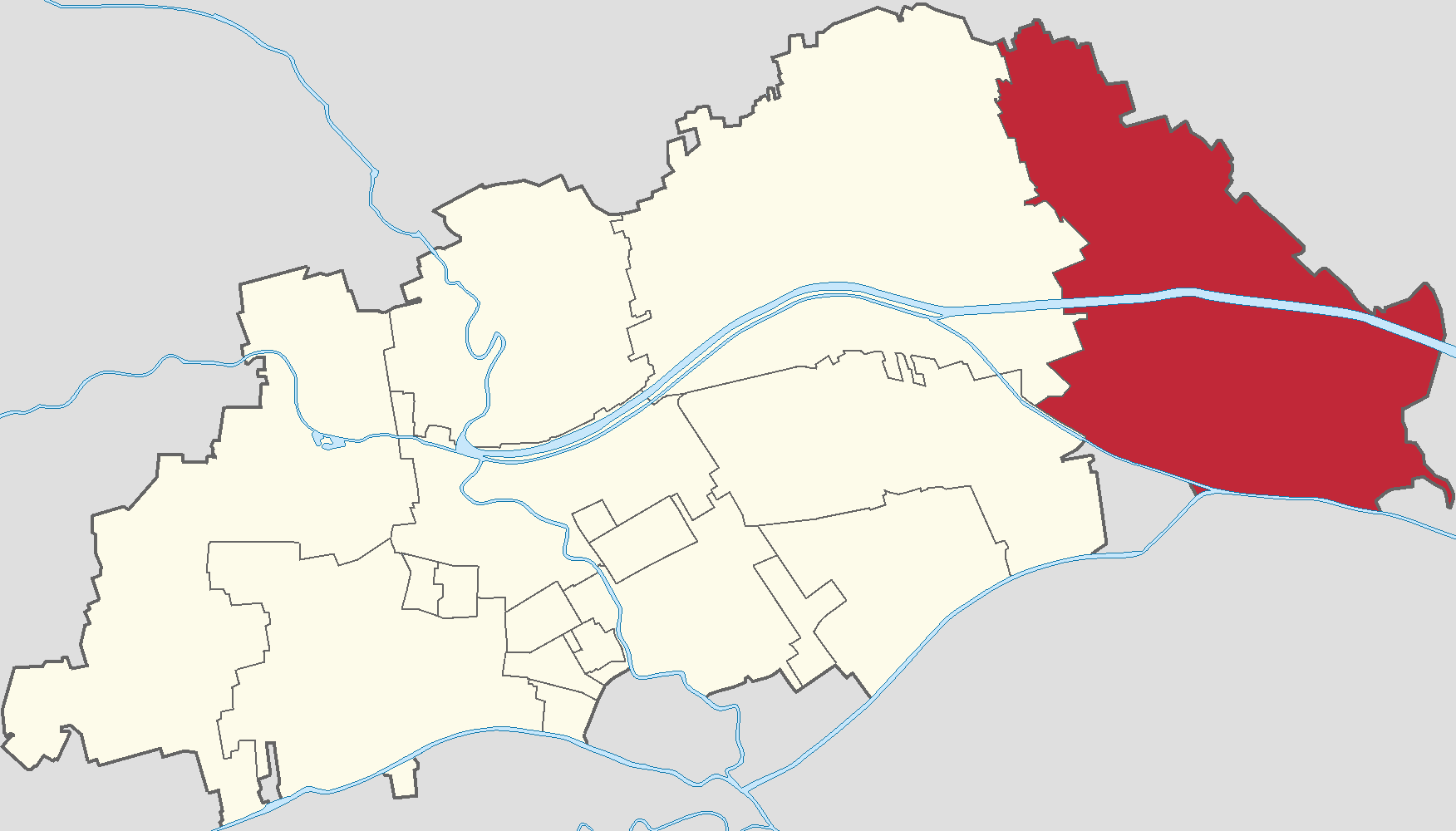
- Location in Beichen District

- Location within Tianjin Location within China
- Coordinates: 39°15′12″N 117°20′50″E
- Country: China
- Municipality: Tianjin
- District: Beichen
- Village-level Divisions: 10 villages

Area
  - Total: 74.05 km^{2} (28.59 sq mi)
- Elevation: 5 m (16 ft)

Population (2010)
  - Total: 45,407
  - Density: 613.2/km^{2} (1,588/sq mi)
- Time zone: UTC+8 (CST)
- Postal code: 300408
- Area code: 022

Xiditou Town (simplified Chinese: 西堤头镇; traditional Chinese: 西堤頭鎮; pinyin: Xīdītóu Zhèn) is a town in the northern Beichen District, Tianjin, China. It shares a border with Shangmatai Town in the north, Panzhuang and Zaojiacheng Towns in the east, Huaming and Jinzhong Subdistricts in the south, as well as Dazhangzhuang and Xiaodian Towns in the west. According to the 2010 census, it has 45,407 people residing under its administration.

The name Xiditou (Chinese: 西堤头; lit. 'West Dam's End') is taken from the town's administrative center, Xiditou Village. The village got the name for situating on the western side of Fangchao Dam.

== Geography ==
Xiditou Town is located on the northern bank of Jinzhong River, with Yongdingxin River passing through its middle. It is connected to both Jinning Expressway and National Highway 112.

== History ==
Timetable of Xiditou Town
Years	Status	Belong to
1912 - 1928		Ninghe County, Zhili
1928 - 1949	Dong Township	Ninghe County, Hebei
1949 - 1953	Dong Township	Ninghe County, Hebei
1953 - 1958	Dongditou Township; Huozhuangzi Township	Ninghe County, Hebei
1958 - 1961	Under Xindian People's Commune	Hangu District, Tianjin
1961 - 1963	Ditou People's Commune; Luxinhe People's Commune	Heping District, Tianjin
1963 - 1985	Ditou People's Commune; Luxinhe People's Commune	Beijiao District, Tianjin
1983 - 1985	Ditou Township; Huozhuangzi Township	Beijiao District, Tianjin
1985 - 1992	Xiditou Township; Huozhuangzi Township	Beijiao District, Tianjin
1992 - 2002	Xiditou Town; Huozhuangzi Town	Beichen District, Tianjin
2002 - present	Xiditou Town	Beichen District, Tianjin

== Administrative divisions ==
At the end of 2022, Xiditou Town is made up of 10 villages, all of which are listed below:

- Dongditou (东堤头)
- Xiditou Cun (西堤头村)
- Liukuai Zhuang (刘快庄)
- Luxinhe (芦新河)
- Yao Zhuangzi (姚庄子)
- Huozhuangzi Cun (霍庄子村)
- Zhao Zhuangzi (赵庄子)
- Ji Zhuangzi (季庄子)
- Xinhou Zhuang (辛侯庄)
- Hansheng Zhuang (韩盛庄)

== See also ==
- List of township-level divisions of Tianjin
