= Shuanghuancun Subdistrict =

Subdistrict of Tianjin, China

Shuanghuancun Subdistrict 双环邨街道
- Subdistrict
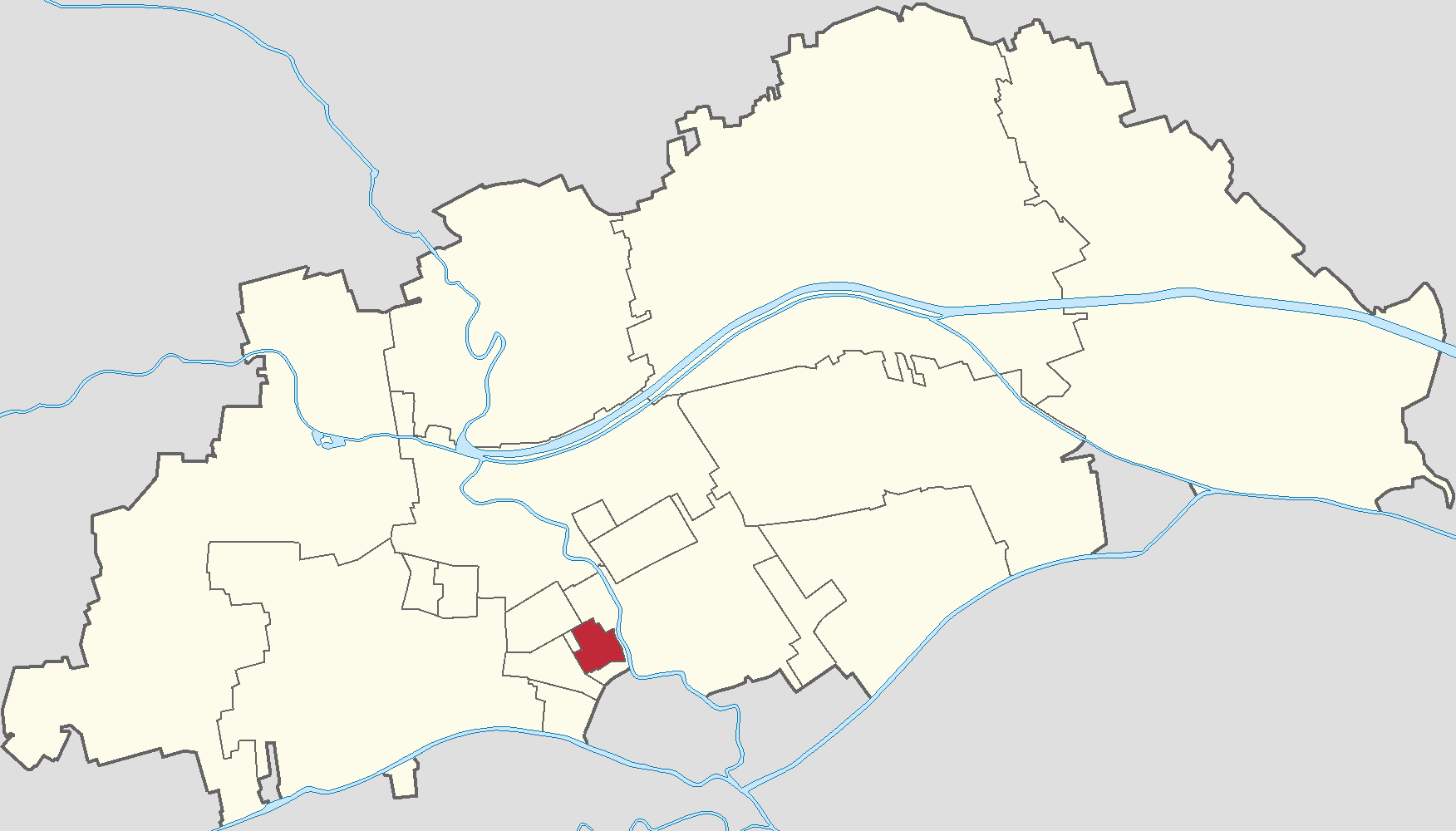
- Location of Shuanghuancun Subdistrict within Beichen District

- Location within Tianjin Location within China
- Coordinates: 39°11′38″N 117°07′29″E
- Country: China
- Municipality: Tianjin
- District: Beichen
- Village-level Divisions: 9 communities

Area
  - Total: 1.30 km^{2} (0.50 sq mi)
- Elevation: 8 m (26 ft)

Population (2010)
  - Total: 35,348
  - Density: 27,200/km^{2} (70,400/sq mi)
- Time zone: UTC+8 (CST)
- Postal code: 300400
- Area code: 022

Shuanghuancun Subdistrict (simplified Chinese: 双环邨街道; traditional Chinese: 雙環邨街道; pinyin: Shuānghuáncūn Jiēdào) is a subdistrict located in the southern part of Beichen District, Tianjin, China. It is located to the south and west of Tianmu Town, east of Jiarongli Subdistrict, and southeast of Ruijing Subdistrict. It is home to a population of 35,348 as of 2010.

The subdistrict used to be part of Hongqiao District. In 2020, it was transferred to the current Beichen District. Its name literally translates to "Two Ring Village".

== History ==
Timeline of Shuanghuancun's History
| Years | Status | Belong to |
|---|---|---|
| 1984 - 1987 | Jiayuanli Residential Area | Beijiao District, Tianjin |
| 1987 - 1990 | Jiayuanli Residential Area; Shuanghuan Residential Area | Beijiao District, Tianjin |
| 1990 - 1993 | Jiayuanli Residential Area; Shuanghuancun Subdistrict | Hongqiao District, Tianjin |
| 1993 - 2020 | Shuanghuancun Subdistrict | Hongqiao District, Tianjin |
| 2020 - present | Shuanghuancun Subdistrict | Beichen District, Tianjin |

== Administrative divisions ==
By 2022, 9 residential communities constitute Shuanghuancun Subdistirct. They are listed below:

- Jiayuan Dongli (佳园东里)
- Jiayuan Nanli (佳园南里)
- Jiayuan Beili (佳园北里)
- Bichun Yuan (碧春园)
- Yichun Li (益春里)
- Haoda Gongyu (浩达公寓)
- Bichun Yuan Di'er Shequ
  (碧春园第二社区)
- Xinjia Yuan Dongli (新佳园东里)
- Mengchun Li (孟春里)

== See also ==
- List of township-level divisions of Tianjin
