= Qingguang (disambiguation) =

Qingguang may refer to the following:

- Qingguang, a town on Beichen District, Tianjin, China
- Wei Qingguang, a Chinese table tennis player
- Zhongshan Elementary School metro station, secondary station name Qingguang Commercial Zone, a station in the Taipei MRT
