= Dazhangzhuang, Tianjin =

Town in Tianjin, China

Dazhangzhuang Town 大张庄镇
- Town
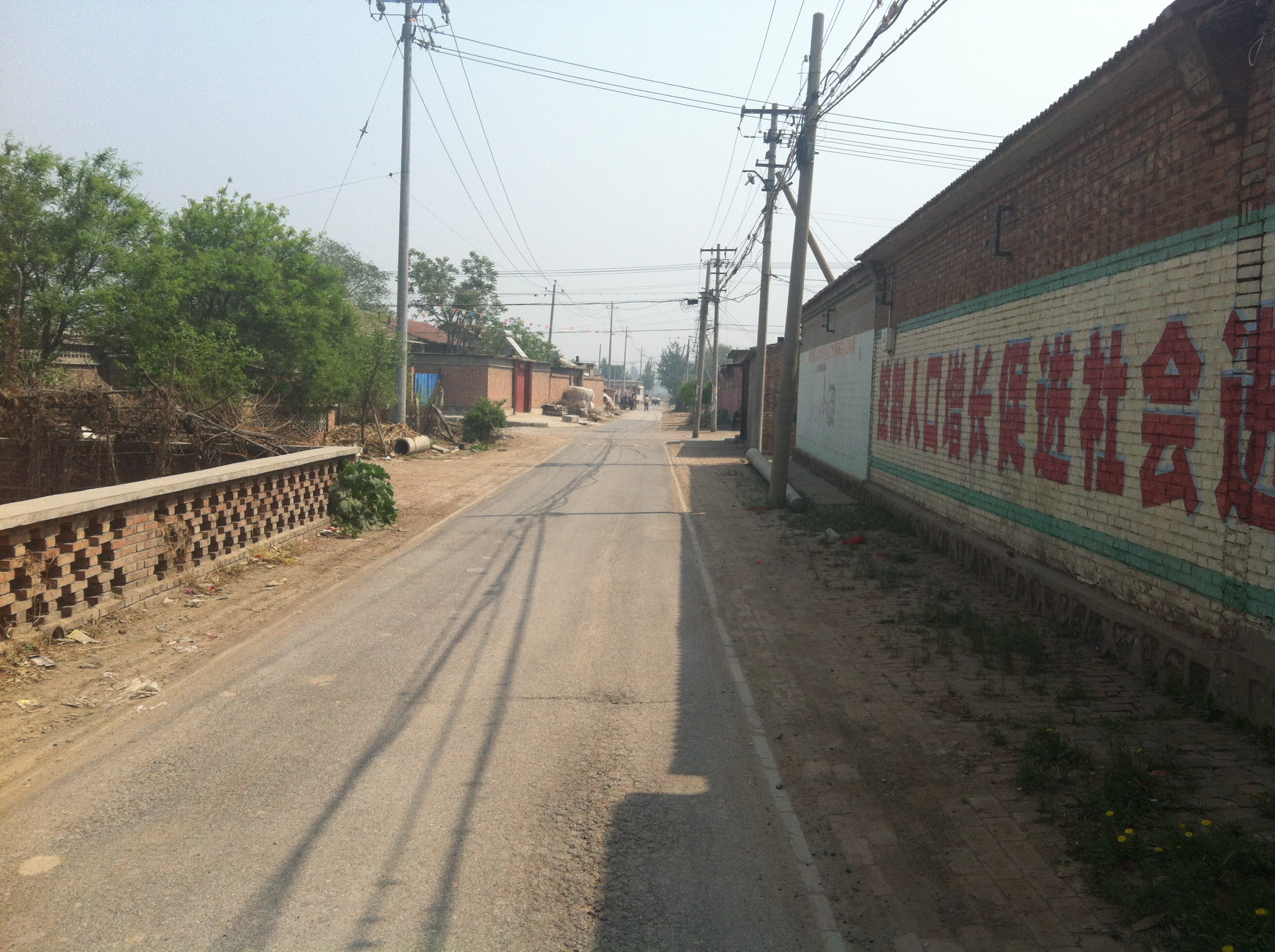
- Zhangsizhuang Village on the north of the town, 2012

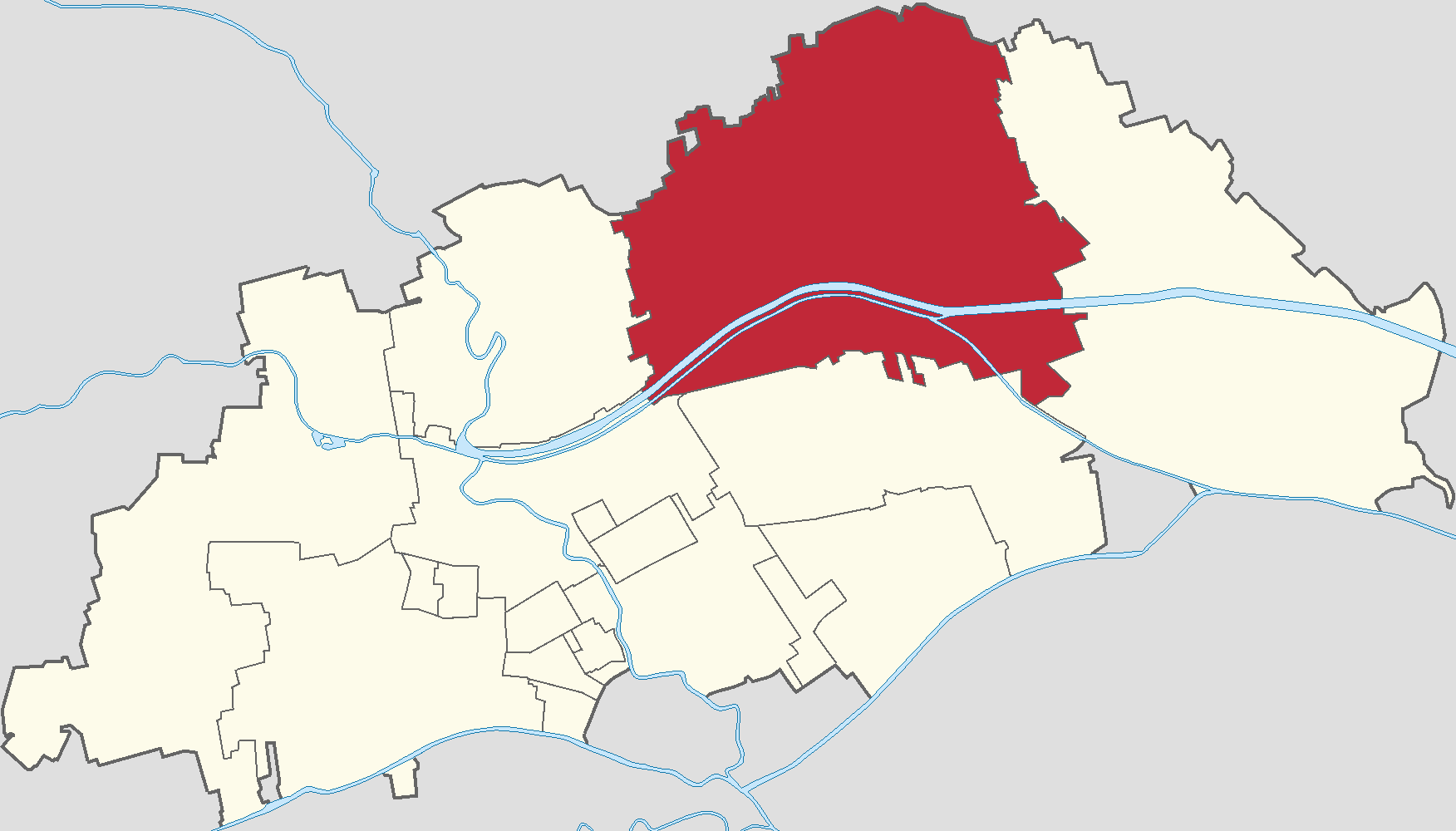
- Location within Beichen District

- Location within Tianjin Location within China
- Coordinates: 39°17′23″N 117°13′19″E
- Country: China
- Municipality: Tianjin
- District: Beichen
- Village-level Divisions: 31 villages

Area
  - Total: 83.15 km^{2} (32.10 sq mi)
- Elevation: 5 m (16 ft)

Population (2010)
  - Total: 29,900
  - Density: 360/km^{2} (931/sq mi)
- Time zone: UTC+8 (CST)
- Postal code: 300405
- Area code: 022

Dazhangzhuang Town (simplified Chinese: 大张庄镇; traditional Chinese: 大張莊鎮; pinyin: Dàzhāngzhuāng Zhèn) is a town situated inside of Beichen District, Tianjin, China. It shares a border with Meichang and Shangmatai Towns in its north, Xiditou Town in its east, Xiaodian Town in its south, as well as Shuangjie Town and Xiazhuzhuang Subdistrict in its west. It is home to 29,900 inhabitants in 2010.

The town got its name Dazhangzhuang (Chinese: 大张庄; lit. 'Great Zhang's Villa') from Dazhangzhuang village, the current administrative center of the town. The village can trace the origin of its name to its foundation during the Qing Dynasty, when the richest family in the settlement was the Zhang family.

== Geography ==
Dazhangzhuang Town is located to the north of Yongdingxin River. National Highway 112 and 233 both pass through the town.

== History ==
Timeline of Dazhangzhuang Town
Years	Status	Under
1953 - 1958	Zhuatangzhuang Township; Nanwangping Township	Beijiao District, Tianjin
1958 - 1961	Administered by Xingdian People's Commune	Hebei District, Tianjin
1961 - 1983	Zhutangzhuang People's Commune; Nanwangping People's Commune	Beijiao District, Tianjin
1983 - 1992	Zhuatangzhuang Township; Nanwangping Township	Beijiao District, Tianjin
1992 - 1997	Dazhangzhuang Township; Nanwangping Township	Beichen District, Tianjin
1997 - 2001	Dazhangzhuang Town; Nanwangping Town	Beichen District, Tianjin
2001 - present	Dazhangzhuang Town	Beichen District, Tianjin

== Administrative divisions ==
In 2022, Dazhangzhuang Town consists of the 31 following villages:

=== Villages ===
- Nan Madan (南麻疸)
- Bei Madan (北麻疸)
- Zhangxian Zhuang (张献庄)
- Zhutang Zhuang (朱唐庄)
- Xiaomeng Zhuang (小孟庄)
- Xiaoyang Zhuang (小杨庄)
- Dayang Zhuang (大杨庄)
- Beisun Zhuang (北孙庄)
- Dazhangzhuang Cun (大张庄村)
- Lixin Zhuang (李辛庄)
- Beihe Zhuang (北何庄)
- Xiaozhu Zhuang (小诸庄)
- Eryan Zhuang (二闫庄)
- Liuzhao Zhuang (刘招庄)
- Liuma Zhuang (刘马庄)
- Nanwangping Cun (南王平村)
- Lu Zhuang (芦庄)
- Lü Zhuang (吕庄)
- Donglian Zhuang (董连庄)
- Renhe Ying (仁和营)
- Xiaohan Zhuang (小韩庄)
- Gao Zhuang (高庄)
- Xifengtai (喜逢台)
- Xiayin Zhuang (下殷庄)
- Daxing Zhuang (大兴庄)
- Dalü Zhuang (大吕庄)
- Tianzhuang Cun (田庄村)
- Xiaoma Zhuang (小马庄)
- Zhangwu Zhuang (张五庄)
- Zhangsi Zhuang (张四庄)
- Dazhu Zhuang (大诸庄)

== See also ==
- List of township-level divisions of Tianjin
