= Yixingbu =

Town in Tianjin, China

Yixingbu Town 宜兴埠镇 Yixingfu Town
- Town
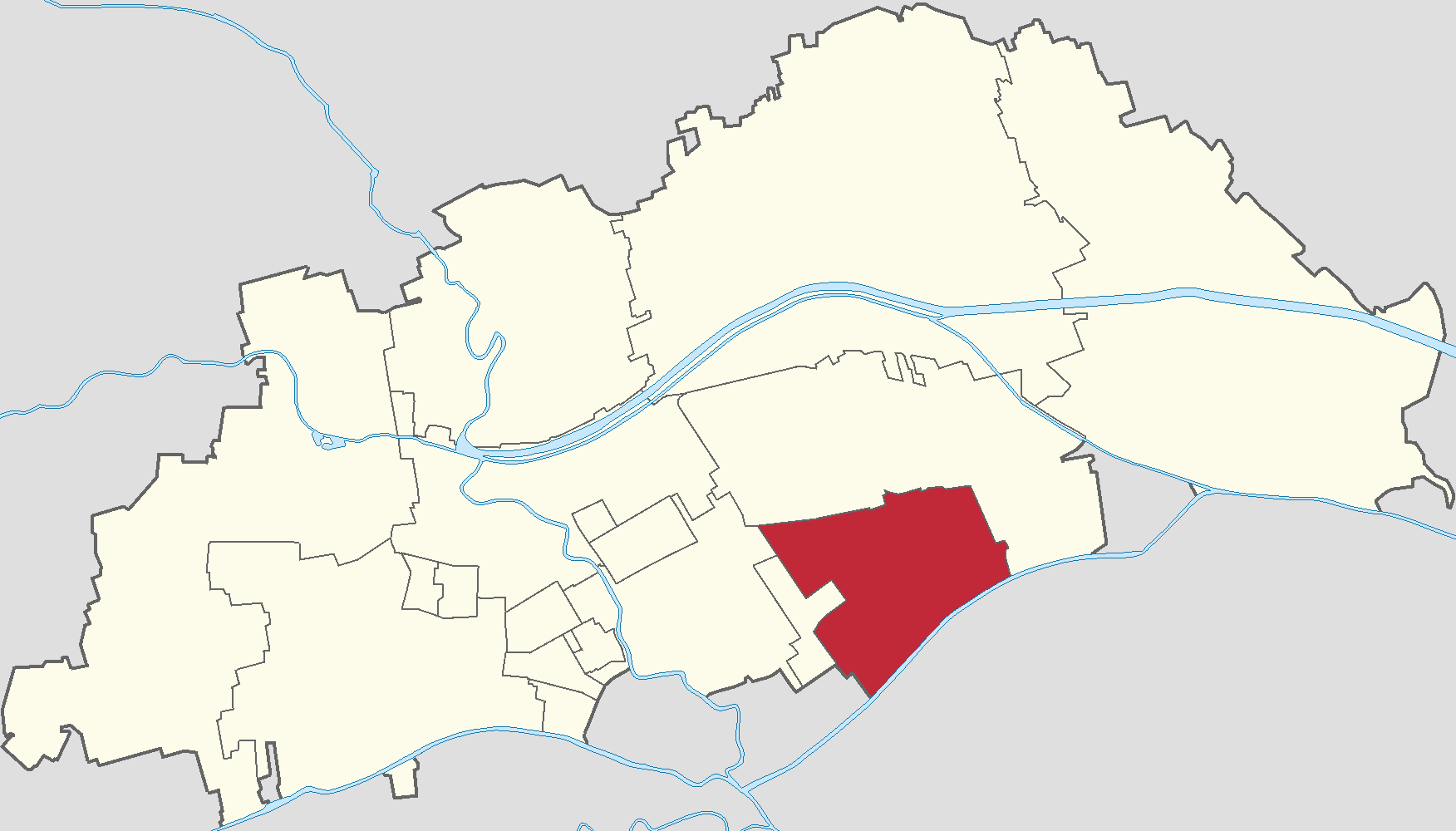
- Location of Yixingbu Town in Beichen District

- Location within Tianjin Location within China
- Coordinates: 39°11′40″N 117°12′42″E
- Country: China
- Municipality: Tianjin
- District: Beichen
- Village-level Divisions: 10 communities 10 villages

Area
  - Total: 41.99 km^{2} (16.21 sq mi)
- Elevation: 4 m (13 ft)

Population (2010)
  - Total: 41,985
  - Density: 999.9/km^{2} (2,590/sq mi)
- Time zone: UTC+8 (CST)
- Postal code: 300402
- Area code: 022

Yixingbu Town (simplified Chinese: 宜兴埠镇; traditional Chinese: 宜興埠鎮; pinyin: Yíxìngbù Zhèn), also pronounced as Yixingfu by its locals, is a town on the southern side of Beichen District, Tianjin, China. It shares border with Xiaodian Town in its north and east, Jinzhong Subdistrict in its southeast, Tiedonglu Subdistrict in its southwest, as well as Pudong Subdistrict and Tianmu Town in its west. In the year 2010, it is home to 41,985 inhabitants.

The town's name literally means "Proper and Flourishing Wharf".

== Geography ==
Yixingbu Town is located on the north of Ziya River. It is connected to the National Highway 233 and Jinning Expressway.

== History ==
Timeline of Yixingbu Town
Years	Status	Under
1953 - 1958	Yixingbu Town	Beijiao District, Tianjin
1958 - 1961	Administered by Xingdian People's Commune	Hebei District, Tianjin
1961 - 1962	Yixingbu People's Commune	Hebei District, Tianjin
1962 - 1983	Yixingbu People's Commune	Beijiao District, Tianjin
1983 - 1985	Yixingbu Township	Beijiao District, Tianjin
1985 - 1992	Yixingbu Town	Beijiao District, Tianjin
1992 - present	Yixingbu Town	Beichen District, Tianjin

== Administrative divisions ==
By the end of 2022, There are 20 subdivisions within Yixingbu Town, of those 10 are residential communities and 10 are villages. They are, by the order of their Administrative Division Codes:

=== Community ===
- Dongma Dao (东马道)
- Gongxi Jie (宫西街)
- Minxian Li (民贤里)
- Hongqi Lu (红旗路)
- Yizhao Lu (宜赵路)
- Nancai Yuan (南菜园)
- Cuijin Yuan (翠金园)
- Qiuchen Jiayuan (秋晨家园)
- Oubo Cheng (欧铂城)
- Yida Yuan (宜达园)

=== Villages ===
- Diyi Jie (第一街)
- Di'er Jie (第二街)
- Disan Jie (第三街)
- Disi Jie (第四街)
- Diwu Jie (第五街)
- Diliu Jie (第六街)
- Diqi Jie (第七街)
- Diba Jie (第八街)
- Dijiu Jie (第九街)
- Dishi Jie (第十街)

== See also ==
- List of township-level divisions of Tianjin
