= Beicang =

Town in Tianjin, China

Beicang Town 北仓镇
- Town
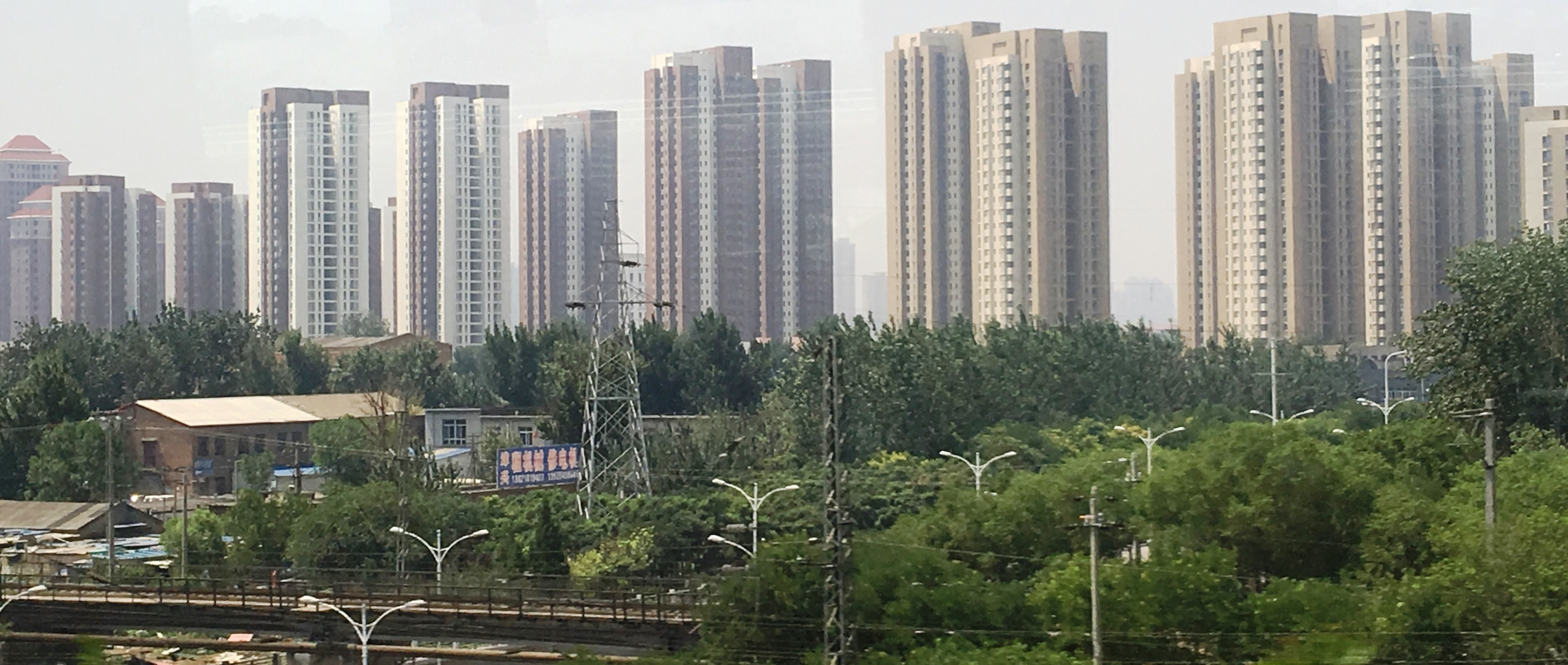
- Residential area of Beicang Town as seen from Beijing–Shanghai railway, 2017

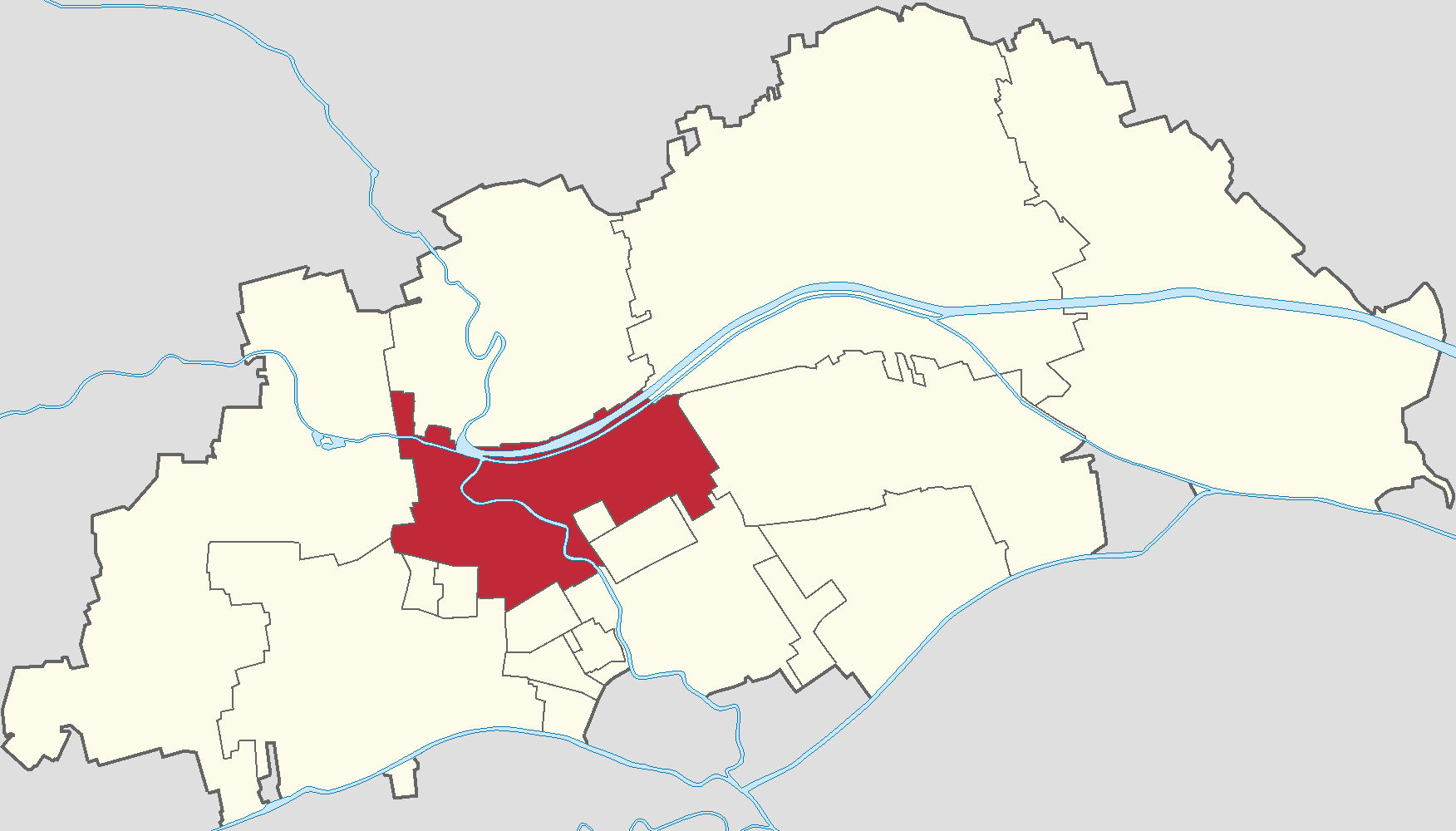
- Location inside of Beichen District

- Location within Tianjin Location within China
- Coordinates: 39°13′48″N 117°07′08″E
- Country: China
- Municipality: Tianjin
- District: Beichen
- Village-level Divisions: 13 communities 13 villages

Area
  - Total: 28.13 km^{2} (10.86 sq mi)
- Elevation: 6 m (20 ft)

Population (2010)
  - Total: 46,921
  - Density: 1,668/km^{2} (4,320/sq mi)
- Time zone: UTC+8 (CST)
- Postal code: 300403
- Area code: 022

Beicang Town (simplified Chinese: 北仓镇; traditional Chinese: 北倉鎮; pinyin: Běicāng Zhèn) is one of the nine towns of Beichen District, Tianjin, China. It shares border with Shuangjie and Dazhangzhuang Towns in its north, Xiaodian Town in its east, Guoyuanxincun and Jixianli Subdistricts in its southeast, Ruijing Subdistrict and Tianmu Town in its south, Qingyuan and Guangyuan Subdistricts in its southwest, as well as Qingguang and Shuangkou Towns in its west. In the year 2010, it is home to 46,921 residents.

The town got its name Beicang (Chinese: 北仓; lit. 'North Granary') during the Yuan Dynasty for storing food transported through the Grand Canal.

== History ==
History of Beicang Town
Time	Status	Within
Yuan Dynasty		Guo County
Ming Dynasty		Wuqing County, Shuntian Prefecture
Qing Dynasty		Tianjin County
1912 - 1949		6th District, Tianjin
1949 - 1950		8th District, Tianjin
1950 - 1953		4th District, Tianjin
1953 - 1958	Beicang Township	Beijiao District
1958 - 1962	Part of Xingfu People's Commune	Hongqiao District, Tianjin
1962 - 1983	Beicang People's Commune	Beijiao District, Tianjin
1983 - 1986	Beicang Township	Beijiao District, Tianjin
1986 - 1992	Beicang Town	Beijiao District, Tianjin
1992 - present	Beicang Town	Beichen District, Tianjin

== Administrative divisions ==
As of 2022, Beicang Town covers 26 subdivisions, including 13 residential communities and 13 villages. They are listed as follows:

=== Communities ===
- Yinhe Li Diyi Shequ
  (引河里第一社区)
- Yinhe Li Di'er Shequ
  (引河里第二社区)
- Jinfeng Li (金凤里)
- Shengcang (盛仓)
- Changying Yulong Wan (长瀛御龙湾)
- Yangguang Kadi'er (阳光卡蒂尔)
- Tianyang (天阳)
- Nehe Li (讷河里)
- Zetianxia (泽天下)
- Fujin Huating (富锦华庭)
- Jingyue Fu (璟悦府)
- Lüjing Huating (绿境华庭)
- Yu Yuan (御园)

=== Villages ===
- Beicang Cun (北仓村)
- Sanyi Cun (三义村)
- Zhaohu Zhuang (赵虎庄)
- Dingzhao Zhuang (丁赵庄)
- Yan Zhuang (闫庄)
- Zhouzhuang (周庄)
- Liju (李咀)
- Liuyuan (刘园)
- Taohuasi (桃花寺)
- Dongxinfang (董新房)
- Taokou (桃口)
- Qudian (屈店)

== See also ==
- List of township-level divisions of Tianjin
