= Tianmu, Tianjin =

Town in Tianjin, China

Tianmu Town 天穆镇
- Town
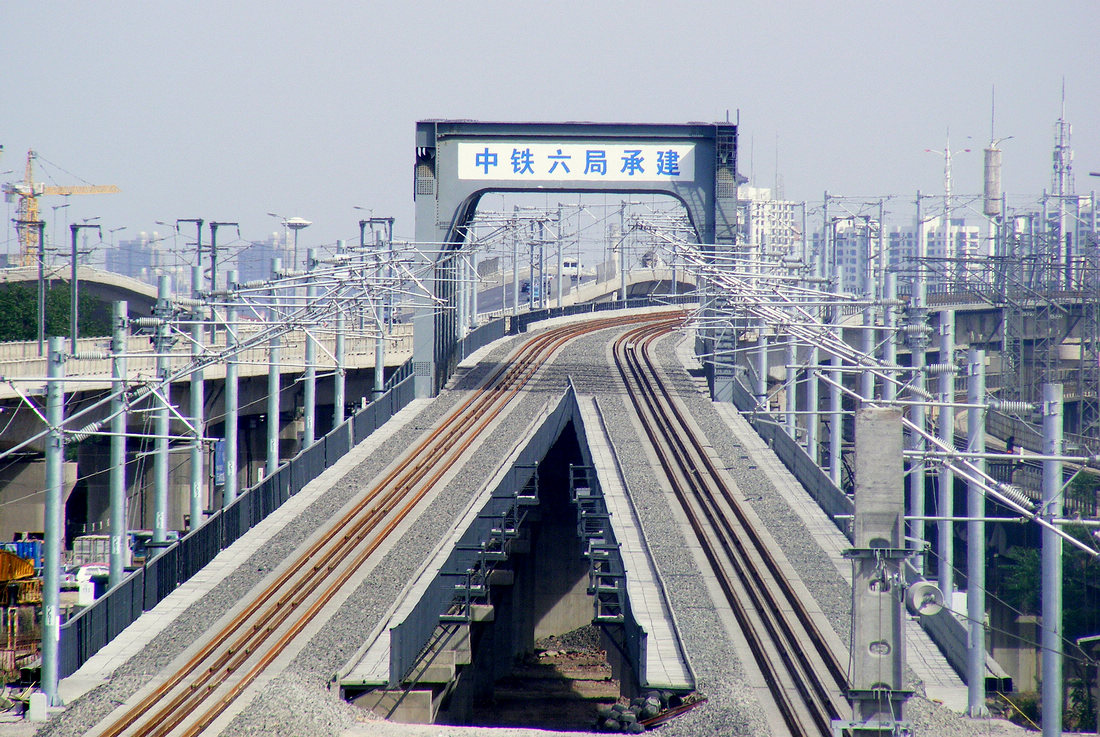
- Nancang Bridge on the Grand Canal, in the center of the town, 2011

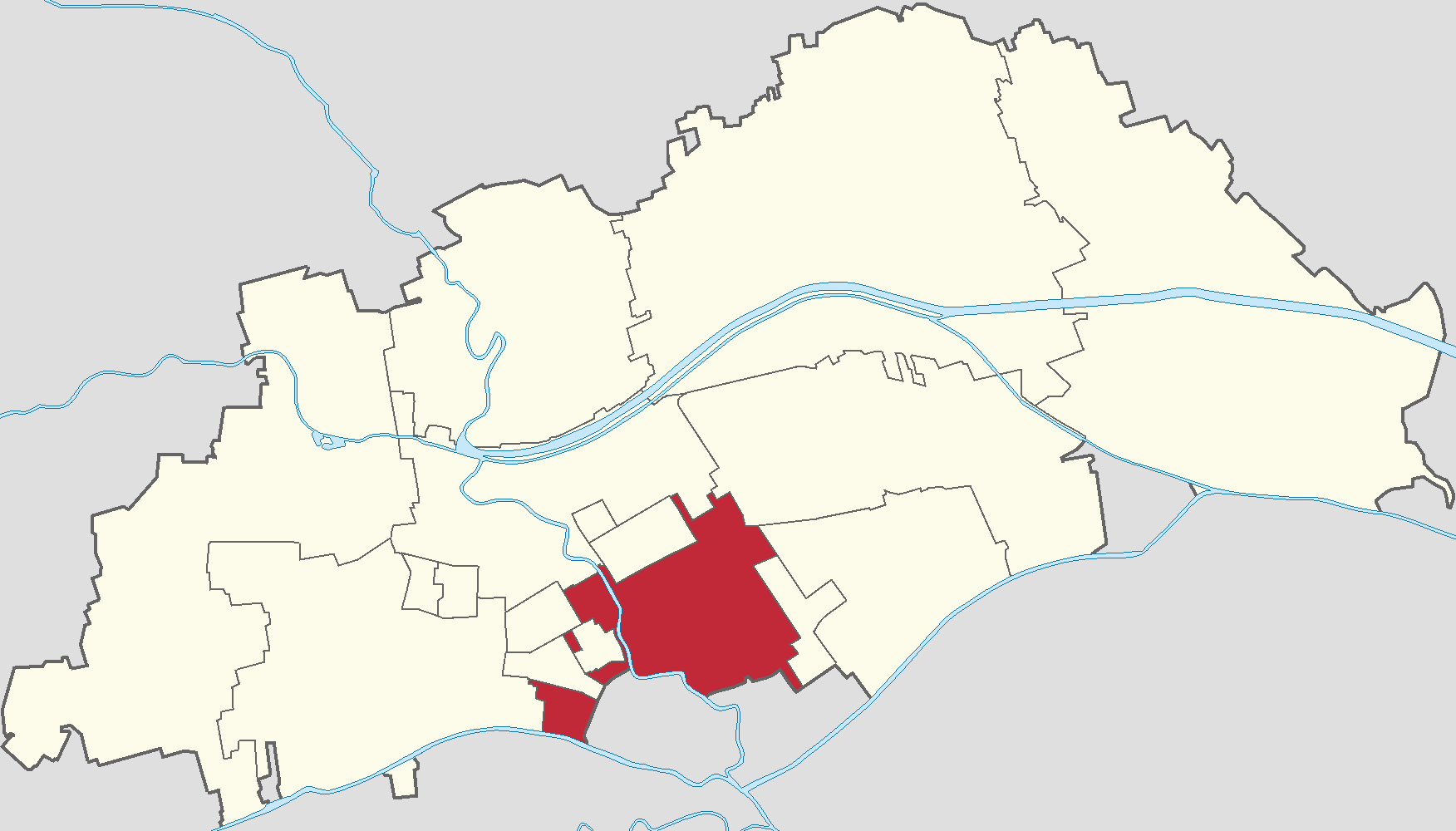
- Location of Tianmu Town within Beichen District

- Location within Tianjin Location within China
- Coordinates: 39°12′01″N 117°08′35″E
- Country: China
- Municipality: Tianjin
- District: Beichen
- Village-level Divisions: 25 communities 12 villages

Area
  - Total: 23.61 km^{2} (9.12 sq mi)
- Elevation: 7 m (23 ft)

Population (2010)
  - Total: 116,084
  - Density: 4,917/km^{2} (12,730/sq mi)
- Time zone: UTC+8 (CST)
- Postal code: 300400
- Area code: 022

Tianmu Town (simplified Chinese: 天穆镇; traditional Chinese: 天穆鎮; pinyin: Tiānmù Zhèn) is a town located in the southern end of Beichen District, Tianjin, China. It shares border with Guoyuanxincun Subdistrict and Beicang Town to its north, Xiaodian Town to its northeast, Yixingbu Town and Pudong Subdistrict to its east, Xinkaihe and Tiedonglu Subdistricts to its southeast, Xianyangbeilu and Dingzigu Subdistricts to its southwest, Jiarongli and Shuanghuancun Subdistricts to its west, as well as Ruijing Subdistrict to its northwest. The town also has two exclaves on the east and south of Jiarongli Subdistrict. It has a total population of 116,084 in the 2010 census.

The name "Tianmu" came from a combination of two former villages: Tianqi and Mujia.

== History ==
Timetable of Tianmu Town
| Years | Status | Belong to |
|---|---|---|
| Ming Dynasty | | Wuqing County, Shuntian Prefecture |
| Qing Dynasty | | Tianjin County, Tianjin Prefecture |
| 1928 - 1953 | | 5th District, Tianjin Special City |
| 1953 - 1955 | Tianmu Hui Ethnic Autonomous Township | Jinbeijiao District, Tianjin |
| 1955 - 1957 | Tianmu Hui Ethnic Autonomous Township | Beijiao District, Tianjin |
| 1957 - 1958 | Tianmu Hui Ethnic Township | Beijiao District, Tianjin |
| 1958 - 1961 | Under Xingfu People's Commune | Hongqiao District, Tianjin |
| 1961 - 1982 | Tianmu People's Commune | Hongqiao District, Tianjin |
| 1962 - 1983 | Tianmu People's Commune | Beijiao District, Tianjin |
| 1983 - 1986 | Tianmu Township | Beijiao District, Tianjin |
| 1986 - 1992 | Tianmu Town | Beijiao District, Tianjin |
| 1992 - present | Tianmu Town | Beichen District, Tianjin |

== Administrative divisions ==
In 2022, Tianmu Town consists of 37 subdivisions, of which 25 are residential communities and 12 are villages. They are listed as follows:

=== Communities ===
- Shunyi Nanli (顺义南里)
- Guangming Dao (光明道)
- Huanyan Li (欢颜里)
- Waiyuan (外园)
- Beisi (北寺)
- Tianmu Dongyuan (天穆东苑)
- Tianchen Xinyuan (天辰新苑)
- Liutan (柳滩)
- Fangzhou (方舟)
- Taoxiang Yuan (桃香园)
- Datong Lüdao Jiayuan
  (大通绿岛家园)
- Jianing Li Lianhe Shequ
  (佳宁里联合社区)
- Putian Dongli (普天东里)
- Lan'an Senlin (蓝岸森林)
- Jinmen Li (金门里)
- Liaohe Yuan (辽河园)
- Ruining Jiayuan (瑞宁嘉园)
- Jinyuan Gongyu (金苑公寓)
- Chenfa Huayuan (辰发花园)
- Yuelin Mingdi (悦林名邸)
- Purun (普润)
- Tianhe Liyuan (天和丽园)
- Hengyi Huating (恒逸华庭)
- Jindi Yicheng Huafu
  (金地艺城华府)
- Wenlan (文澜)

=== Villages ===
- Yanjie (闫街)
- Mazhuang (马庄)
- Nancang (南仓)
- Tianmu (天穆)
- Liutan (柳滩)
- Qinjian (勤俭)
- Huoju (霍咀)
- Liufangzi (刘房子)
- Wuju (吴咀)
- Wangzhuang (王庄)
- Baimiaocun Nonggongshang Lianhe Gongsi
  (白庙村农工商联合公司)
- Guoxinzhuangcun Nonggongshang Lianhe Gongsi
  (郭辛庄村农工商联合公司)

== See also ==
- List of township-level divisions of Tianjin
