= Jixianli Subdistrict =

Subdistrict of Tianjin, China

Jixianli Subdistrict 集贤里街道
- Subdistrict
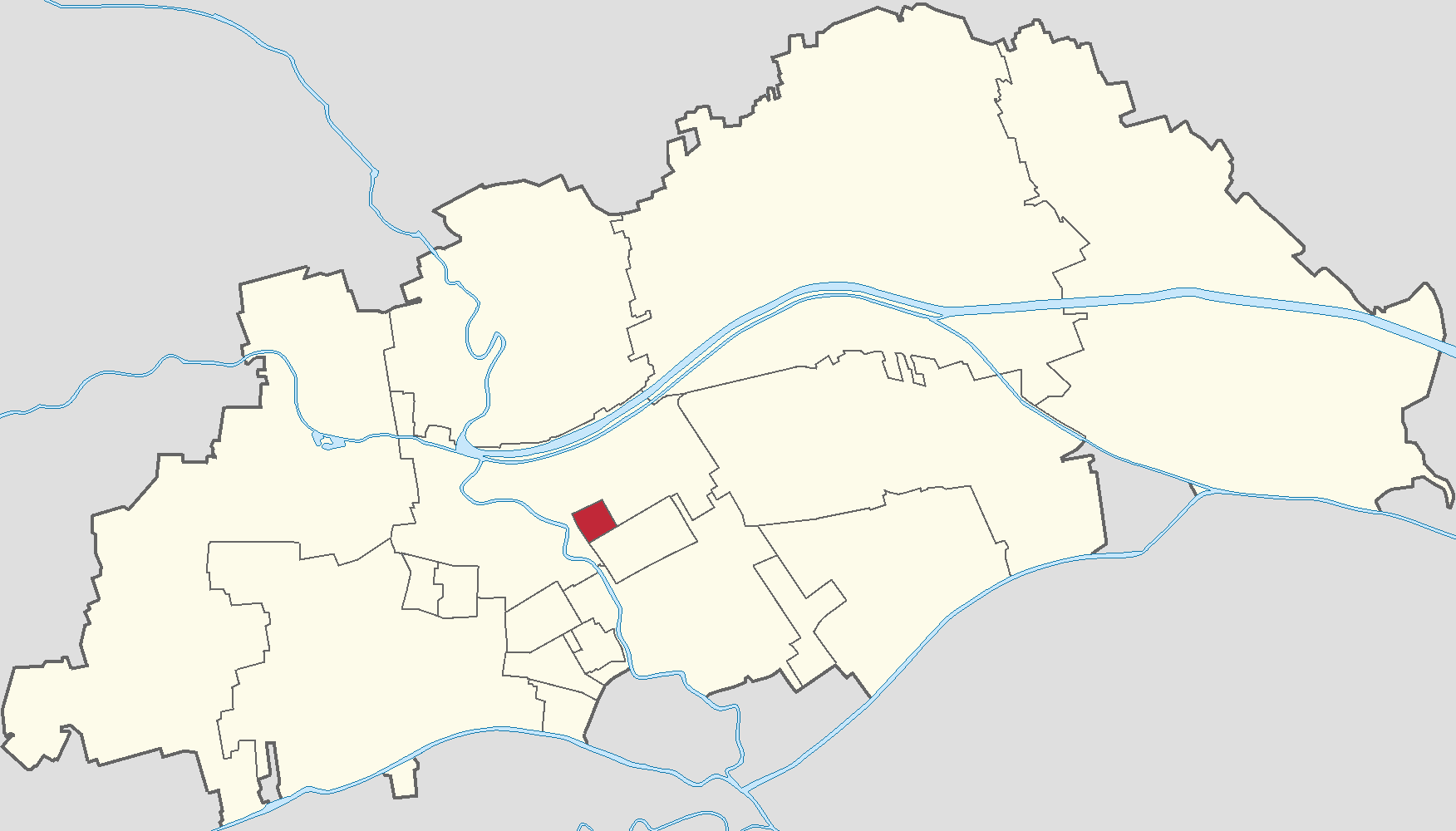
- Location in Beichen District

- Location within Tianjin Location within China
- Coordinates: 39°13′37″N 117°07′33″E
- Country: China
- Municipality: Tianjin
- District: Beichen
- Village-level Divisions: 10 communities

Area
  - Total: 0.83 km^{2} (0.32 sq mi)
- Elevation: 7 m (23 ft)

Population (2010)
  - Total: 17,472
  - Density: 21,000/km^{2} (55,000/sq mi)
- Time zone: UTC+8 (CST)
- Postal code: 300403
- Area code: 022

Jixianli Subdistrict (simplified Chinese: 集贤里街道; traditional Chinese: 集賢里街道; pinyin: Jíxiánlǐ Jiēdào) is a subdistrict situated on the center of Beichen District, Tianjin, China. It borders Beicang Town to its north, as well as Guoyuanxincun Subdistrict and Tianmu Town to its south. As of 2010, it has a population of 17,472.

The subdistrict was created in 1982. Its name "Jixianli" literally means "Gathering-talents Village".

== Administrative divisions ==
In 2022, Jixianli Subdistrict is divided into 10 residential communities. They are listed below:

- Tailai Xili (泰来西里)
- Tailai Dongli (泰来东里)
- Anda Li (安达里)
- Hulin Li (虎林里)
- Baiquan Li (拜泉里)
- Jixian Li (集贤里)
- Hongyun Xinli (红云新里)
- Yingtai Li (瀛台里)
- Beiyi Dao (北医道)
- Fadianlou (发电楼)

== See also ==
- List of township-level divisions of Tianjin
