= Guangyuan Subdistrict, Tianjin =

Subdistrict of Tianjin, China

Guangyuan Subdistrict 广源街道
- Subdistrict
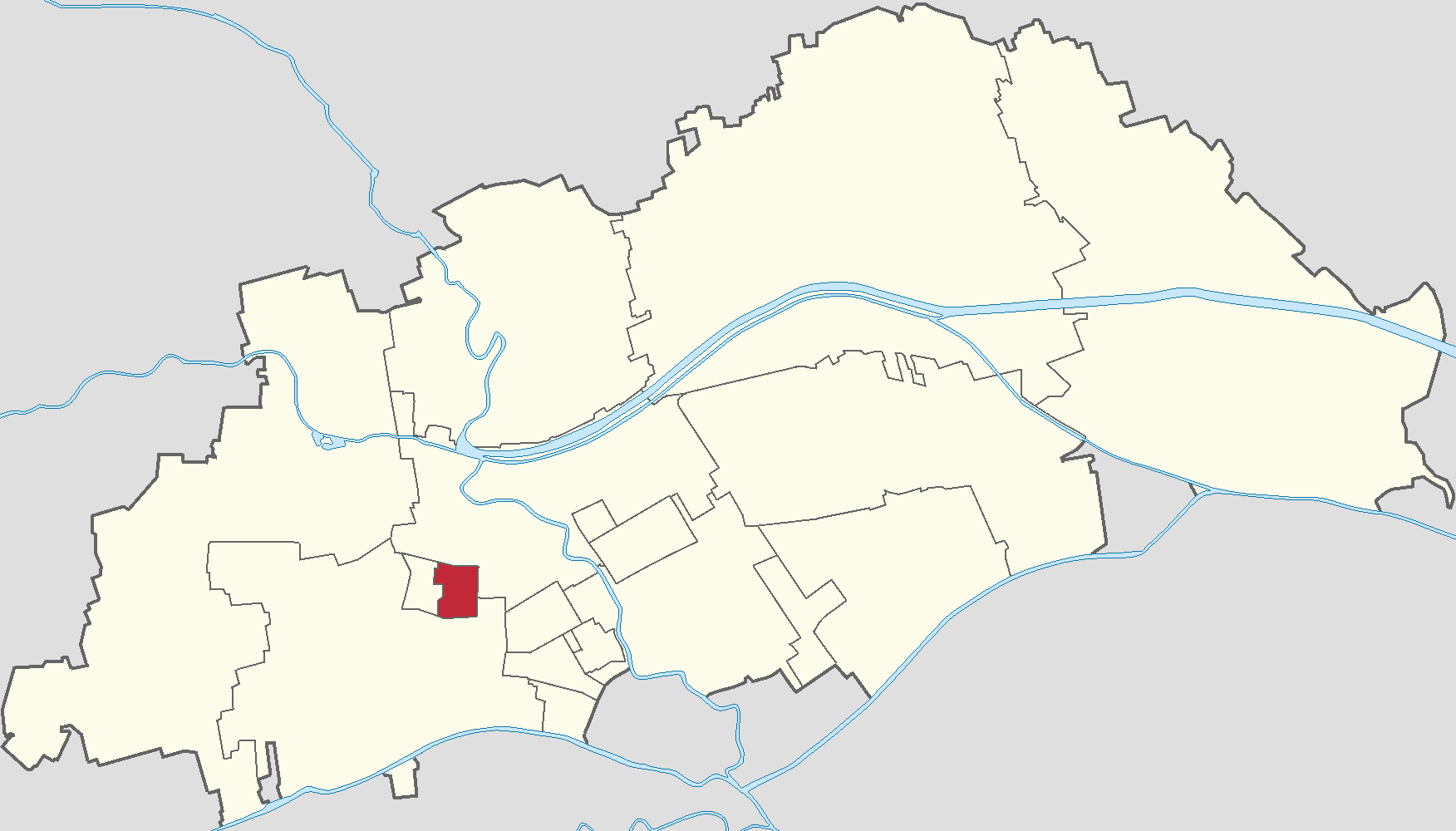
- Location within Beichen District

- Location within Tianjin Location within China
- Coordinates: 39°12′25″N 117°05′20″E
- Country: China
- Municipality: Tianjin
- District: Beichen
- Village-level Divisions: 10 communities
- Elevation: 6 m (20 ft)
- Time zone: UTC+8 (CST)
- Postal code: 300134
- Area code: 022

Guangyuan Subdistrict (simplified Chinese: 广源街道; traditional Chinese: 廣源街道; pinyin: Guǎngyuán Jiēdào) is a subdistrict situated on the western portion of Beichen District, Tianjin, China. It is located to the south of Beicang Town, north of Qingguang Town, and east of Qingyuan Subdistrict.

The subdistrict was established in 2013. Its name can be translated as "Broad Origin".

== Administrative divisions ==
As of 2022, Guangyuan Subdistrict composes 10 residential communities. They are listed below:

- Rongkang Yuan (荣康园)
- Rongju Yuan (荣居园)
- Rongxi Yuan (荣溪园)
- Rongxin (荣馨园)
- Rongya Yuan (荣雅园)
- Rongxiang Yuan (荣翔园)
- Shengkang Yuan (盛康园)
- Rongle Yuan (荣乐园)
- Shengfu Yuan (盛福园)
- Antai Yuan (安泰园)

== See also ==
- List of township-level divisions of Tianjin
