= Qingyuan Subdistrict, Tianjin =

Subdistrict of Tianjin, China

Qingyuan Subdistrict 青源街道
- Subdistrict
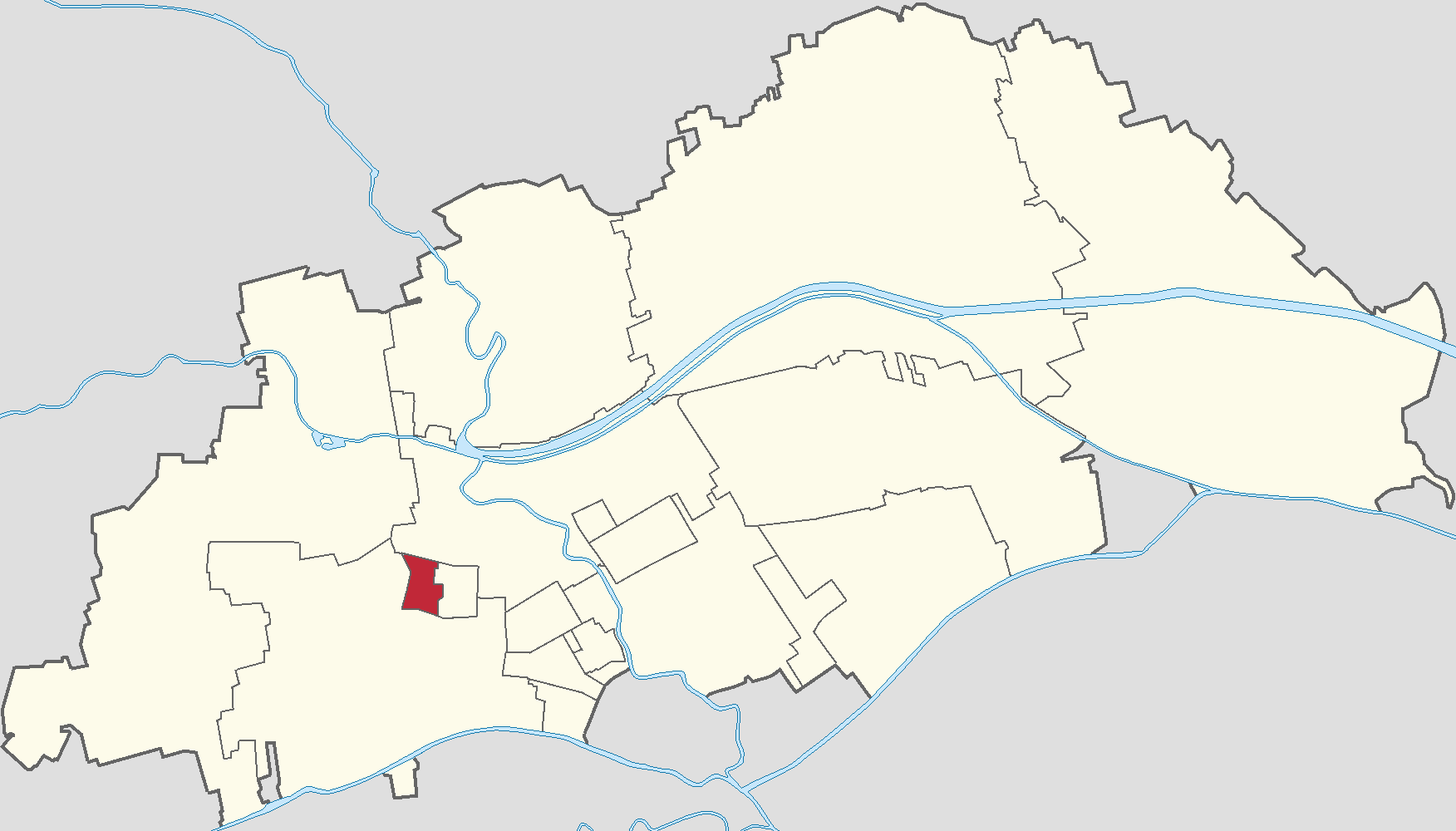
- Location in Beichen District

- Location within Tianjin Location within China
- Coordinates: 39°12′25″N 117°05′21″E
- Country: China
- Municipality: Tianjin
- District: Beichen
- Village-level Divisions: 5 communities
- Elevation: 7 m (23 ft)
- Time zone: UTC+8 (CST)
- Postal code: 300134
- Area code: 022

Qingyuan Subdistrict (Chinese: 青源街道; pinyin: Qīngyuán Jiēdào) is a subdistrict located on the western half of Beichen District, Tianjin, China. It borders Beicang Town in its north, Guangyuan Subdistrict in its east, as well as Qingguang Town in its south and west.

The subdistrict was created in 2013. Its name literally means "Green Origin"

== Administrative divisions ==
As of 2022, Qingyuan Subdistrict oversees 5 residential communities. They are, by the order of their Administrative Division Codes:

- Rongcui Yuan (荣翠园)
- Huanchang Yuan (欢畅园)
- Qingze Yuan (青泽园)
- Shengjin Yuan (盛锦园)
- Shengyi Yuan (盛逸园)

== See also ==
- List of township-level divisions of Tianjin
