= Pudong Subdistrict =

Subdistrict of Tianjin, China

Pudong Subdistrict 普东街道
- Subdistrict
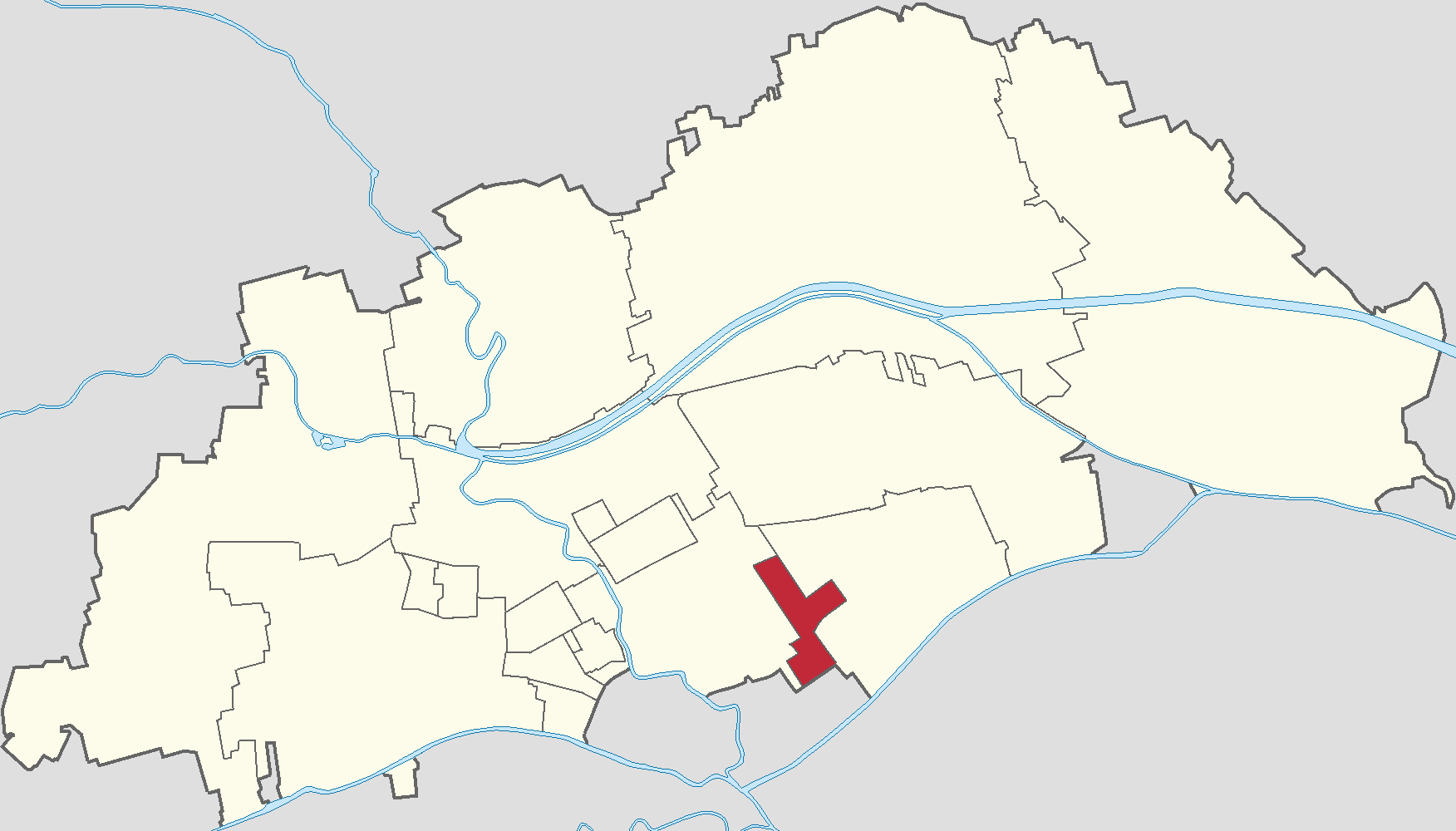
- Location within Beichen District

- Location within Tianjin Location within China
- Coordinates: 39°12′21″N 117°12′08″E
- Country: China
- Municipality: Tianjin
- District: Beichen
- Village-level Divisions: 23 communities

Area
  - Total: 3.56 km^{2} (1.37 sq mi)
- Elevation: 5 m (16 ft)

Population (2010)
  - Total: 57,621
  - Density: 16,200/km^{2} (41,900/sq mi)
- Time zone: UTC+8 (CST)
- Postal code: 300402
- Area code: 022

Pudong Subdistrict (simplified Chinese: 普东街道; traditional Chinese: 普東街道; pinyin: Pǔdōng Jiēdào) is a subdistrict situated in the southern part of Beichen District, Tianjin, China. It borders Tianmu Town to the north and west, Yixingbu Town to the east, and Tiedonglu Subdistrict to the south. Its population is 57,621 in the 2010 census.

The subdistrict was founded in 2004. Its name "Pudong" is referring Pujihe East Avenue that runs east–west through the subdistrict.

== Administrative divisions ==
In 2022, Pudong Subdistrict composes 23 residential communities. They are listed as follows:

- Wanke Xincheng (万科新城)
- Tianyuan Xiaoqu (田园小区)
- Wanda Xincheng Diyi Shequ
  (万达新城第一社区)
- Jinri Jiayuan (今日家园)
- Baoli Xinyuan (宝利新苑)
- Puxing Li (普兴里)
- Jinyi Li (金宜里)
- Guoyi Li (国宜里)
- Pukang Li (普康里)
- Dushi Taoyuan (都市桃源)
- Guoli Beili (国宜北里)
- Fuyi Li (富宜里)
- Qiangyi Li (强宜里)
- Pudong Xinyuan (普东新苑)
- Qiuyi Jiayuan (秋怡家园)
- Hongli Huayuan (红荔花园)
- Huaixing Yuan (淮兴园)
- Huaisheng Yuan (淮盛园)
- Xianghe Yuan (祥和园)
- Chenyi Huayuan (宸宜花园)
- Chenxin Huayuan (宸欣家园)
- Tianshili Huayuan (天士力花园)
- Minyi Li (民宜里)

== See also ==
- List of township-level divisions of Tianjin
