= Shuangjie =

Town in Tianjin, China

Shuangjie Town 双街镇
- Town
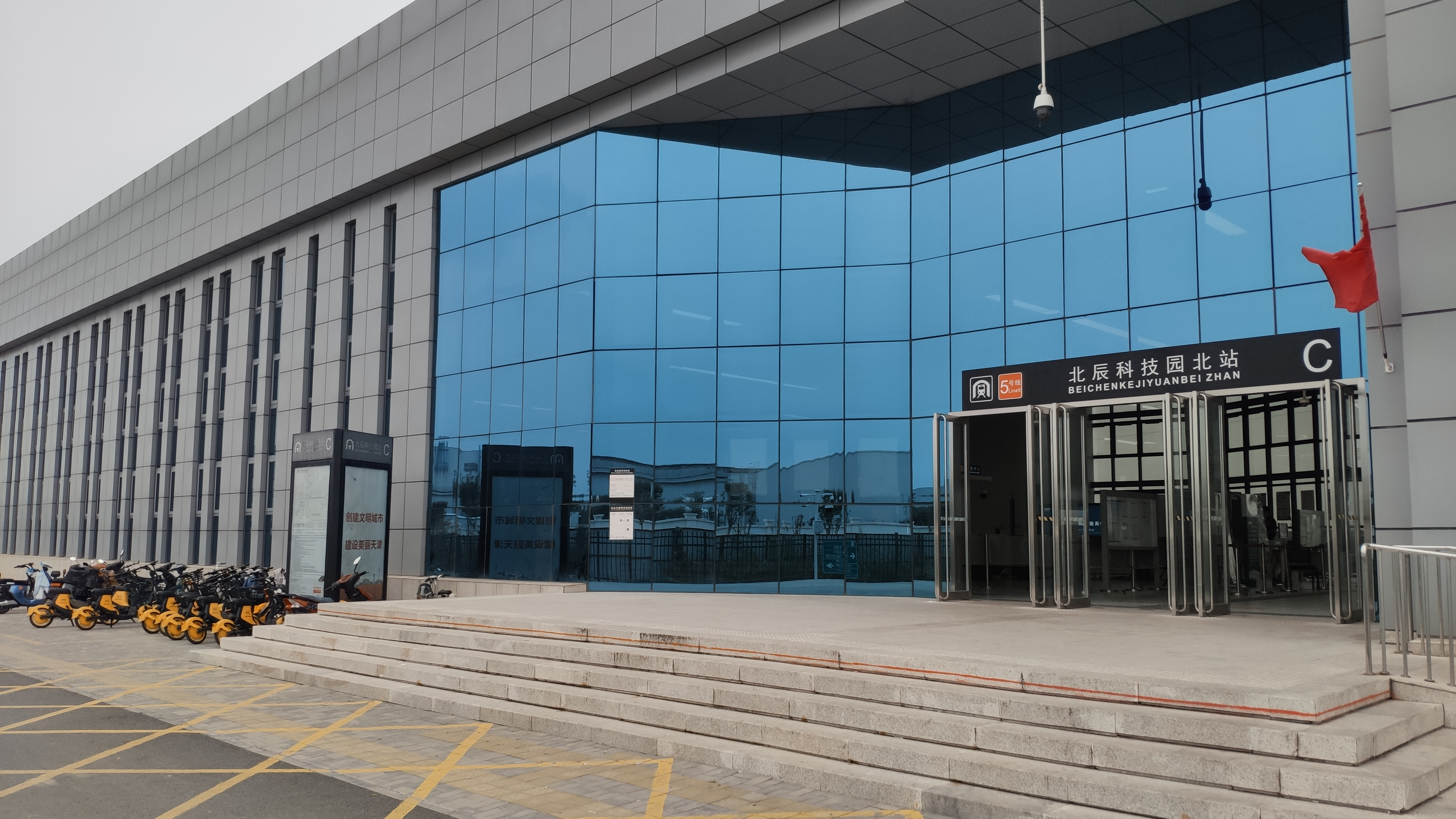
- Beichen Science Park North Station on the east of the town, 2021

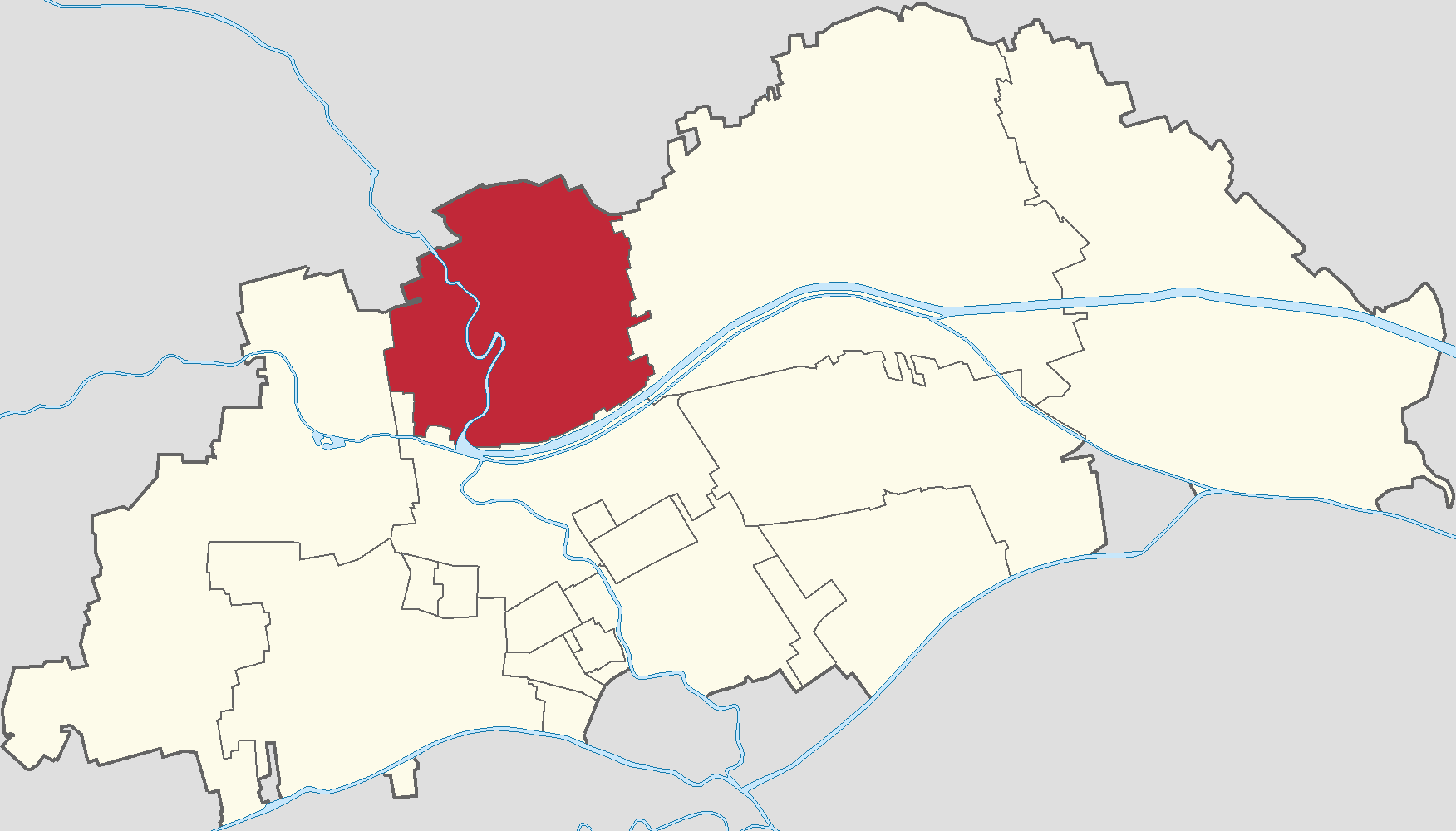
- Location inside of Beichen District

- Location within Tianjin Location within China
- Coordinates: 39°15′37″N 117°06′15″E
- Country: China
- Municipality: Tianjin
- District: Beichen
- Village-level Divisions: 9 communities 15 villages

Area
  - Total: 42.62 km^{2} (16.46 sq mi)
- Elevation: 6 m (20 ft)

Population (2010)
  - Total: 54,564
  - Density: 1,280/km^{2} (3,316/sq mi)
- Time zone: UTC+8 (CST)
- Postal code: 300403
- Area code: 022

Shuangjie Town (simplified Chinese: 双街镇; traditional Chinese: 雙街鎮; pinyin: Shuāngjiē Zhèn) is a town inside of Beichen District, Tianjin, China. It shares border with Huangzhuang Subdistrict and Xiazhuzhuang Town to the north, Dazhangzhuang Town to the east, Beicang Town to the south, and Shuangkou Town to the west. It has 54,564 inhabitants as of 2010.

The name Shuangjie (Chinese: 双街; lit. 'Two Street') came from Shuangjie Village, the seat of the town's government. The village was first established during the Ming Dynasty, and got its name for having two main streets in the early stage of formation.

== Geography ==
Shuangjie Town is situated to the north of Yongdingxin River, with the Grand Canal passing through the west of the town. National Highway 103 also passes through the town.

== History ==
Timeline of Shuangjie Town
Years	Status	Belong to
1949 – 1950		8th District, Tianjin
1950 – 1953		4th District, Tianjin
1953 – 1958	Shuangjie Township	4th District, Tianjin
1958 – 1959	Under Xingfu People's Commune	Hongqiao District, Tianjin
1959 – 1961	Under Beicang People's Commune	Hongqiao District, Tianjin
1961 – 1983	Shuangjie People's Commune	Beijiao District, Tianjin
1983 – 1992	Shuangjie Township	Beijiao District, Tianjin
1992 – 1995	Shuangjie Township	Beichen District, Tianjin
1995 –present	Shuangjie Town	Beichen District, Tianjin

== Administrative divisions ==
At the end of 2022, Shuangjie Town is divided into 24 subdivisions, including 9 residential communities and 15 villages. They are listed as follows:

=== Communities ===
- Shuangjie Xin Jiayuan (双街新家园)
- Shanghe Huayuan (上河花园)
- Junde Huayuan (郡德花园)
- Banwan Bandao (半湾半岛)
- Chengji Meijing (城际美景)
- Jiagu Huating (嘉谷华庭)
- Julong Yuan (聚龙园)
- Chailou Longyuan (柴楼隆园)
- Chailou Xingyuan (柴楼兴园)

=== Villages ===
- Xiaojie (小街)
- Hangou (汉沟)
- Pangju (庞咀)
- Huyuan (胡元)
- Langyuan (郎元)
- Shang Pukou (上蒲口)
- Zhangwan (张湾)
- Yangdi (杨堤)
- Chailou (柴楼)
- Shuangjie Cun (双街村)
- Xia Pukou (下蒲口)
- Shazhuang (沙庄)
- Xia Xinzhuang (下辛庄)
- Xi Zhaozhuang (西赵庄)
- Changzhuang (常庄)

== See also ==
- List of township-level divisions of Tianjin
