= Beichen, Tianjin =

Beichen 北辰区
- District
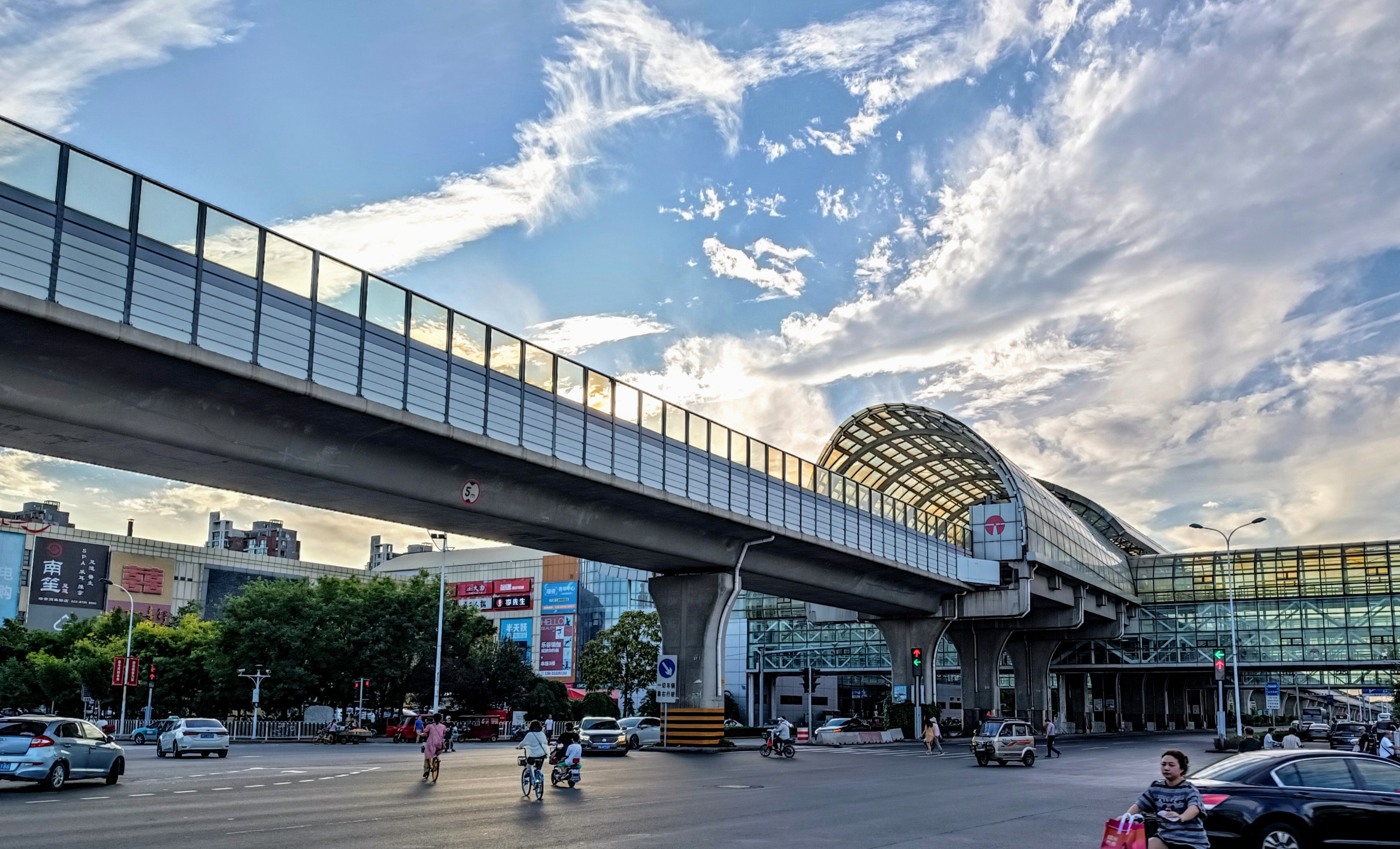
- Ruijingxinyuan Station
- Interactive map of Beichen
- Coordinates: 39°13′17″N 117°07′57″E
- Country: People's Republic of China
- Municipality: Tianjin
- Township-level divisions: 8 subdistricts 9 towns
- Elevation: 6 m (20 ft)
- Time zone: UTC+8 (China Standard)
- Postal code: 300400
- Area code: 0022
Tianjin district map
Subdivisions of Tianjin
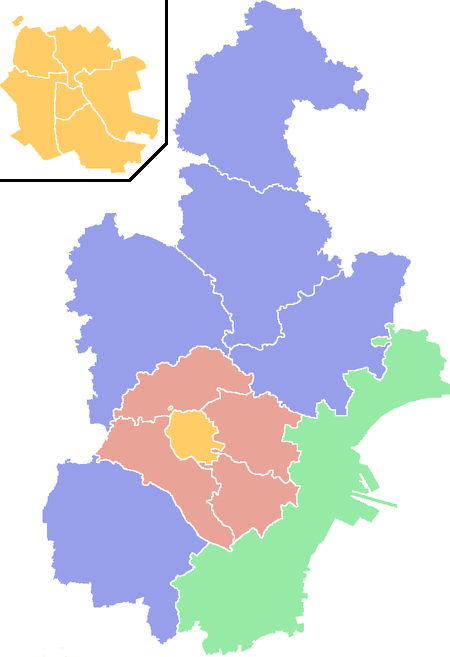
Core districts See inset
1	Heping
2	Hedong
3	Hexi
4	Nankai
5	Hebei
6	Hongqiao
Suburbs
7	Dongli
8	Xiqing
9	Jinnan
10	Beichen
Binhai and Rural
13	Binhai	14	Ninghe
11	Wuqing	15	Jinghai
12	Baodi	16	Ji Zhou
- Website: tjbc.gov.cn

Beichen District (simplified Chinese: 北辰区; traditional Chinese: 北辰區; pinyin: Běichén Qū) is a district of the municipality of Tianjin, People's Republic of China. Before June 1992, the district was named Beijiao District (simplified Chinese: 北郊区; traditional Chinese: 北郊區; pinyin: Běijiāo Qū; lit. 'north suburb'), reflecting its position in the northern suburbs of Tianjin. As the city expanded, it gradually became part of the urban core and was renamed to Beichen.

The district occupies approximately 478.5 km^{2} (184.7 sq mi), with a population of 320,000. China National Highway 103 goes through the heart of the district. Beichen District also hosts the North Canal (北运河), a branch of the Hai River.

== Administrative divisions ==
There are 8 subdistricts and 9 towns in the district:

Name	Chinese (S)	Hanyu Pinyin	Population (2010)	Area (km^{2})
Guoyuanxincun Subdistrict	果园新村街道	Guǒyuánxīncūn Jiēdào	39,607	
Jixianli Subdistrict	集贤里街道	Jíxiánlǐ Jiēdào	17,472	
Pudong Subdistrict	普东街道	Pǔdōng Jiēdào	57,621	
Ruijing Subdistrict	瑞景街道	Ruìjǐng Jiēdào	72,842	
Jiarongli Subdistrict	佳荣里街道	Jiārónglǐ Jiēdào	N/A	
Qingyuan Subdistrict	青源街道	Qīngyuán Jiēdào	N/A	
Guangyuan Subdistrict	广源街道	Guǎngyuán Jiēdào	N/A	
Shuanghuancun Subdistrict	双环邨街道	Shuānghuáncūn Jiēdào	N/A	
Beicang town	北仓镇	Běicāng Zhèn	46,921	26
Tianmu town	天穆镇	Tiānmù Zhèn	116,084	30
Shuangjie town	双街镇	Shuāngjiē Zhèn	54,564	42.11
Shuangkou town	双口镇	Shuāngkǒu Zhèn	63,999	72.4
Qingguang town	青光镇	Qīngguāng Zhèn	43,280	48
Xiaodian town	小淀镇	Xiǎodiàn Zhèn	34,512	43.13
Yixingbu town	宜兴埠镇	Yíxìngbù Zhèn	41,985	22.48
Xiditou town	西堤头镇	Xīdītóu Zhèn	45,407	82.84
Dazhangzhuang town	大张庄镇	Dàzhāngzhuāng Zhèn	29,900	48
industrial & farming zones			4,927	

== Transportation ==
=== Metro ===
Beichen is currently served by two metro lines operated by Tianjin Metro:

- Line 1 - Guojiuchang, Ruijingxinyuan, Liuyuan
- Line 3 - Yixingfu, Tianshili, Huabeijituan, Fengchanhe, Xiaodian

== Climate ==
Beichen District has a humid continental climate (Köppen climate classification Dwa). The average annual temperature in Beichen is 12.7 °C (54.9 °F). The average annual rainfall is 524.6 mm (20.65 in) with July as the wettest month. The temperatures are highest on average in July, at around 26.7 °C (80.1 °F), and lowest in January, at around −3.8 °C (25.2 °F).

Climate data for Beichen District, elevation 3 m (9.8 ft), (1991–2020 normals, extremes 1981–present)
Month	Jan	Feb	Mar	Apr	May	Jun	Jul	Aug	Sep	Oct	Nov	Dec	Year
Record high °C (°F)	14.3 (57.7)	20.2 (68.4)	30.7 (87.3)	33.6 (92.5)	39.2 (102.6)	39.6 (103.3)	40.5 (104.9)	36.9 (98.4)	35.5 (95.9)	30.6 (87.1)	22.5 (72.5)	14.3 (57.7)	40.5 (104.9)
Mean daily maximum °C (°F)	2.2 (36.0)	6.1 (43.0)	13.3 (55.9)	21.3 (70.3)	27.4 (81.3)	30.8 (87.4)	31.8 (89.2)	30.8 (87.4)	26.8 (80.2)	19.8 (67.6)	10.6 (51.1)	3.6 (38.5)	18.7 (65.7)
Daily mean °C (°F)	−3.7 (25.3)	−0.1 (31.8)	7.1 (44.8)	14.9 (58.8)	21.1 (70.0)	25.0 (77.0)	27.0 (80.6)	25.8 (78.4)	20.8 (69.4)	13.4 (56.1)	4.7 (40.5)	−1.8 (28.8)	12.9 (55.1)
Mean daily minimum °C (°F)	−8.4 (16.9)	−5.3 (22.5)	1.5 (34.7)	8.8 (47.8)	14.8 (58.6)	19.5 (67.1)	22.5 (72.5)	21.5 (70.7)	15.7 (60.3)	7.8 (46.0)	−0.3 (31.5)	−6.3 (20.7)	7.7 (45.8)
Record low °C (°F)	−20.0 (−4.0)	−16.5 (2.3)	−8.7 (16.3)	−2.2 (28.0)	4.7 (40.5)	9.9 (49.8)	16.0 (60.8)	14.2 (57.6)	5.7 (42.3)	−3.4 (25.9)	−9.6 (14.7)	−21.1 (−6.0)	−21.1 (−6.0)
Average precipitation mm (inches)	2.4 (0.09)	5.8 (0.23)	6.6 (0.26)	24.0 (0.94)	37.3 (1.47)	77.3 (3.04)	160.8 (6.33)	113.4 (4.46)	50.6 (1.99)	31.8 (1.25)	14.1 (0.56)	2.5 (0.10)	526.6 (20.72)
Average precipitation days (≥ 0.1 mm)	1.4	2.1	2.8	4.6	6.1	9.1	11.2	9.7	6.2	4.9	3.0	1.7	62.8
Average snowy days	2.3	2.1	0.7	0.1	0	0	0	0	0	0	1.4	2.1	8.7
Average relative humidity (%)	55	53	48	48	52	63	75	77	71	66	63	58	61
Mean monthly sunshine hours	169.4	169.7	213.7	232.6	258.8	220.8	193.0	199.5	202.7	191.4	160.5	162.0	2,374.1
Percentage possible sunshine	56	56	57	58	58	50	43	48	55	56	54	56	54
Source: China Meteorological Administration
