= Jiarongli Subdistrict =

Subdistrict of Tianjin, China

Jiarongli Subdistrict 佳荣里街道
- Subdistrict
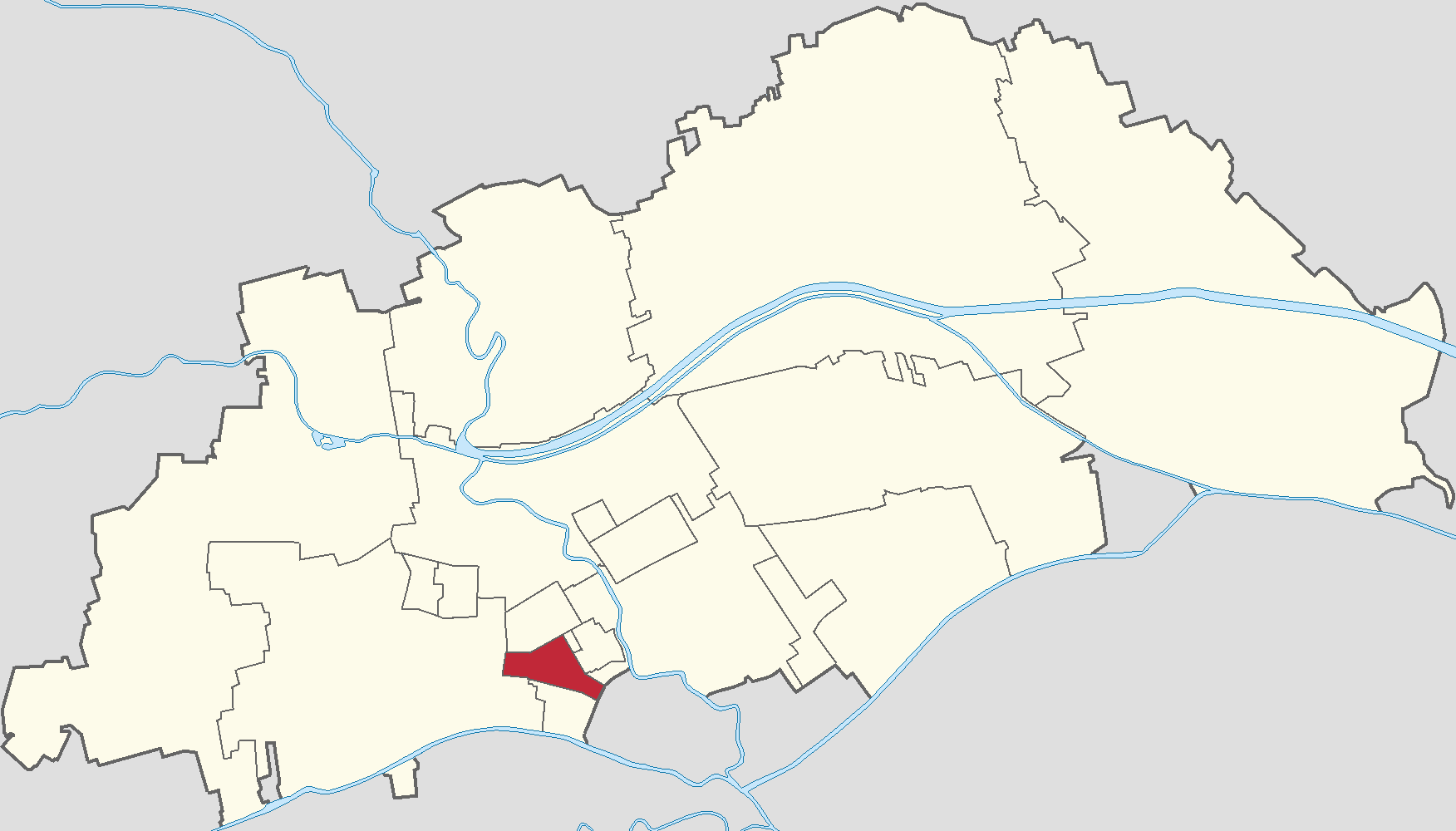
- Location inside of Beichen District

- Location within Tianjin Location within China
- Coordinates: 39°11′39″N 117°07′19″E
- Country: China
- Municipality: Tianjin
- District: Beichen
- Village-level Divisions: 13 communities

Area
  - Total: 2.76 km^{2} (1.07 sq mi)
- Elevation: 8 m (26 ft)
- Time zone: UTC+8 (CST)
- Postal code: 300134
- Area code: 022

Jiarongli Subdistrict (simplified Chinese: 佳荣里街道; traditional Chinese: 佳榮里街道; pinyin: Jiārónglǐ Jiēdào) is a subdistrict located in the southern portion of Beichen District, Tianjin, China. It borders Ruijing Subdistrict in its north, Shuanghuancun Subdistrict and Tianmu Town in its east, an exclave of Tianmu Town in its south, and Qingguang Town in its west.

The subdistrict was created in 2012. Its name Jiarongli can be translated as "Good and Glory Village".

== Administrative divisions ==
In the year 2022, Jiarongli Subdistrict is divided into 13 residential communities. They are listed as follows:

- Jiarong Li (佳荣里)
- Jiaxin Li (佳欣里)
- Jia'an Li (佳安里)
- Jingtian Gongyu (井田公寓)
- Ruida Li (瑞达里)
- Jiayuan Xinli (佳园新里)
- Yanyu Yishu Jiayuan
  (燕宇艺术家园)
- Ruixian Yuan (瑞贤园)
- Ruixiu Yuan (瑞秀园)
- Renmin Jiayuan (人民家园)
- Xinghe Shidai (星河时代)
- Shuntong (顺通)
- Nuanjin (暖金)

== See also ==
- List of township-level divisions of Tianjin
