= Guoyuanxincun Subdistrict =

Subdistrict of Tianjin, China

Guoyuanxincun Subdistrict 果园新村街道
- Subdistrict
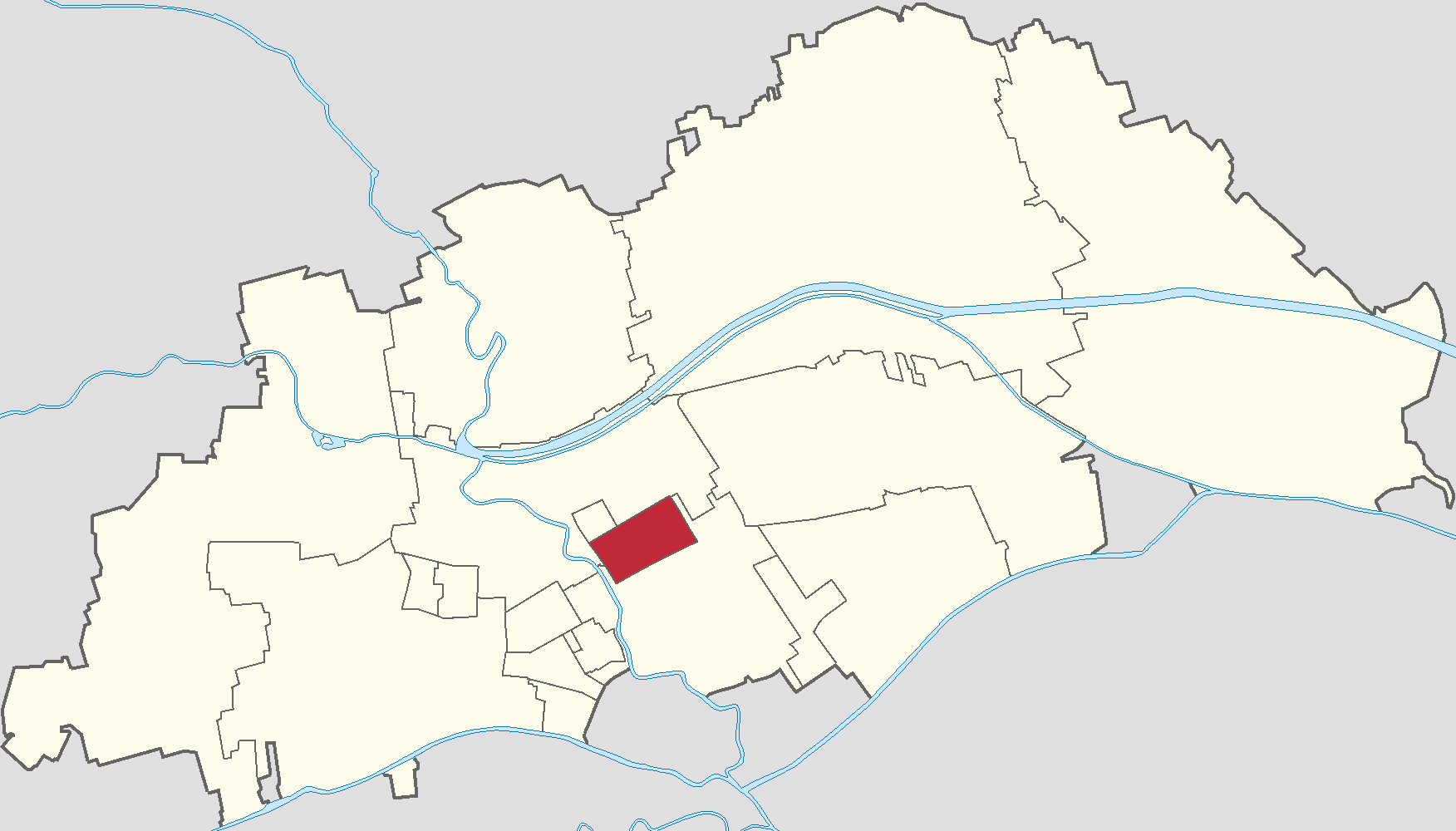
- Location in Beichen District

- Location within Tianjin Location within China
- Coordinates: 39°13′12″N 117°07′55″E
- Country: China
- Municipality: Tianjin
- District: Beichen
- Village-level Divisions: 12 communities

Area
  - Total: 2.70 km^{2} (1.04 sq mi)
- Elevation: 5 m (16 ft)

Population (2010)
  - Total: 39,607
  - Density: 14,700/km^{2} (38,000/sq mi)
- Time zone: UTC+8 (CST)
- Postal code: 300400
- Area code: 022

Guoyuanxincun Subdistrict (simplified Chinese: 果园新村街道; traditional Chinese: 果園新村街道; pinyin: Guǒyuánxīncūn Jiēdào) is a subdistrict in Beichen District, Tianjin, China. It borders Jinxianli Subdistrict and Beicang Town in its north, and Tianmu Town in its south. It has a total population of 39,607 according to the 2010 Chinese Census.

The name "Guoyuanxincun" (Chinese: 果园新村; lit. 'Orchard New Village') is a combination of two former settlements within the region: Guoyuan Residential Area and the village of Gongren Xincun.

== History ==
Timetable of Guoyuanxincun Subdistrict
Years	Status	Under
1953 - 1955		Jinbeijiao District, Tianjin
1955 - 1958		Beijiao District, Tianjin
1958 - 1962	Administered by Xingfu People's Commune	Hongqiao District, Tianjin
1962 - 1969	Administered by Beicang People's Commune	Beijiao District, Tianjin
1969 - 1972	Xincun Subdistrict Revolutionary Committee	Beijiao District, Tianjin
1972 - 1982	Xincun Subdistrict	Beijiao District, Tianjin
1982 - 1992	Guoyuanxincun Subdistrict	Beijiao District, Tianjin
1992 - present	Guoyuanxincun Subdistrict	Beichen District, Tianjin

== Administrative divisions ==
By 2022, Guoyuanxincun Subdistrict comprises 12 residential communities. They are listed below:

- Guoyuan Li (果园里)
- Danfeng Li (丹凤里)
- Chaoyang Li (朝阳里)
- Xuri Li (旭日里)
- Xiaguang Li (霞光里)
- Xinhua Li (新华里)
- Wenquan Huayuan (温泉花园)
- Duwang Xincheng (都旺新城)
- Chenqing Jiayuan (辰庆家园)
- Chenxing Jiayuan (辰兴家园)
- Chenyue Jiayuan (辰悦家园)
- Dongsheng Li (东升里)

== See also ==
- List of township-level divisions of Tianjin
