= China National Highway 112 =

Beltway in Hebei and Tianjin, China

National Highway 112
- 112国道

Route information
- Length: 1,228 km (763 mi)

Major junctions
- Orbital around Beijing

Location
- Country: China

Highway system
- National Trunk Highway System; Primary; Auxiliary
| ← G111 | → G201 |

China National Highway 112 is a 1228 km ring road which runs outside Beijing (municipality).

== Route and distance ==
Route and distance

| City | Distance (km) |
|---|---|
| Gaobeidian, Hebei | 0 |
| Bazhou, Hebei | 59 |
| Xiqing District, Tianjin | 118 |
| Beichen District, Tianjin | 136 |
| Ninghe, Tianjin | 207 |
| Fengnan, Hebei | 245 |
| Tangshan, Hebei | 262 |
| Fengrun, Hebei | 288 |
| Zunhua, Hebei | 332 |
| Xinglong, Hebei | 403 |
| Yingshouyingzi, Hebei | 430 |
| Fengning, Hebei | 645 |
| Chicheng, Hebei | 789 |
| Xuanhua, Hebei | 885 |
| Laiyuan, Hebei | 1086 |
| Yi County, Hebei | 1191 |
| Laishui, Hebei | 1210 |
| Gaobeidian, Hebei | 1228 |

== See also ==
- China National Highways
