= Shuntian Prefecture =

Historical administrative division in Beijing, China

- Traditional Chinese: 順天府
- Simplified Chinese: 顺天府
Transcriptions
Standard Mandarin
- Hanyu Pinyin: ShùnTiānfǔ

Location of Shuntian Prefecture in Zhili Province, 1820

Shuntian Prefecture was an administrative region of China during the Ming and Qing dynasties, equivalent to Beijing Municipality in today's People's Republic of China. However, the area of the prefecture jurisdiction was different. The term Shuntian fu also referred to the yamen (office) of the prefecture's local government.

== Evolution ==
During the Yuan dynasty, the imperial capital circuit known as Dadu circuit (大都路; Dadulu) was under control of the Central Secretariat (Zhongshu Sheng). During the eighth month of the first year of reign of the Hongwu Emperor of the new Ming dynasty, this was renamed to Beiping prefecture, and in the tenth month it was attached to Shandong province. In the first lunar month in the first year of the reign of the Yongle Emperor, the capital was renamed Beijing and the prefecture as Shuntian.

Shuntian prefecture went through many changes during the Qing dynasty, and it was only in 1743 during the reign of the Qianlong Emperor that its borders and administrative divisions were settled. Then, Shuntian prefecture was divided into four sub-divisions (路廳, luting) and twenty four sub-prefectures (州, zhou) counties (縣, xian). It was also placed under an imperial magistrate (府尹, fuyin).

In 1910 with the demise of the Qing dynasty, Shuntian prefecture was slowly abolished on 4 October 1914 which became Capital Area (京兆地方; Jīngzhào Dìfāng) later became Beiping Special City on 20 June 1928. The remains of the Shuntian yamen can be found in today's Dongcheng District in Beijing at Donggong street (東公街).

== Jurisdiction ==
During the Ming era, Shuntian had 5 sub-prefectures (州) and 22 counties (縣). In 1490, Shuntian had 100,518 households and a population of 669,033. In 1578, Shuntian had 101,134 households and a population of 706,861.

After 1743, Shuntian Prefecture was divided into four sub-divisions:

- The west subdivision (西路廳; Xī Lùtīng) had its seat near Lugou Bridge, and it ruled Zhuozhou (涿州) sub-prefecture, and Daxing (大興), Wanping (宛平), Liangxiang (良鄉) and Fangshan (房山) counties.
- The east subdivision (東路廳; Dōng Lùtīng) had its seat at Zhangjiawan, and it ruled over Tongzhou (通州) and Jizhou (薊州) sub-prefectures, and Sanhe (三河), Wuqing (武清), Baodi (寶坻), Ninghe (寧河) and Xianghe (香河) counties.
- The south subdivision (南路廳; Nán Lùtīng) had its seat at Huangcun (黃村), and it ruled over Bazhou (霸州) sub-prefecture, and Baoding (保定), Wenan (文安), Dacheng (大城), Gu'an (固安), Yongqing (永清) and Dong'an (東安) counties.
- The north subdivision (北路廳; Běi Lùtīng) had its seat at Gonghua City (鞏華城) in Shahe Suburb (沙河鎮), and it ruled over Changpingzhou (昌平州) sub-prefecture, and Shunyi (順義), Huairou (懷柔), Miyun (密雲), and Pinggu (平谷) counties.

== Administrative level ==
As Shuntian was the administrative district containing the capital Beijing, the Shuntian prefecture magistrate (府尹, fuyin) was particularly renowned. This magistrate was a Qing official of the third rank (正三品, zhengsanpin), which was two to three ranks higher than magistrates of other prefectures. In fact, some of the Shuntian magistrates were shilang (侍郎) rank imperial ministers. While the yamen of third-rank Qing officials used copper seals, the yamen of Shuntian prefecture used silver seals. Even though the sub-prefectures and counties of Shuntian formally belonged to the Zhili viceroyalty, the Shuntian magistrate did not have a subordinate relationship with the Viceroy of Zhili. The areas of the Shuntian prefecture outside the Beijing city wall were under the dual administration of the Zhili viceroy and Shuntian magistrate yamens. In contrast, the Zhili viceroy had no authority within the Beijing city wall.

== Administration of Beijing ==
During the early Qing dynasty, an interesting facet of Beijing city administration was that Han and Manchu had separate residence and administration. The Manchu Bannermen all lived in the Three-Battalions Barracks (三大營, sandaying) or so-called inner city located in Xijiao (西郊). The Han Chinese and other ethnic groups lived in the outer city. As the outer city consisted of five towns and ten lanes (五城十坊, wuchengshifang), it gave rise to an old Chinese saying "inside eight banners, outside five towns" (內八旗外五城, neibaqiwaiwucheng). While Shuntian magistrate had jurisdiction over the Han and other ethnic population in the outer city, the jurisdiction of the Bannermen fell under the military office of the Nine Gates Infantry Commander (九門提督, jiumen tidu).
