= Ruijing Subdistrict =

Subdistrict of Tianjin, China

Ruijing Subdistrict 瑞景街道
- Subdistrict
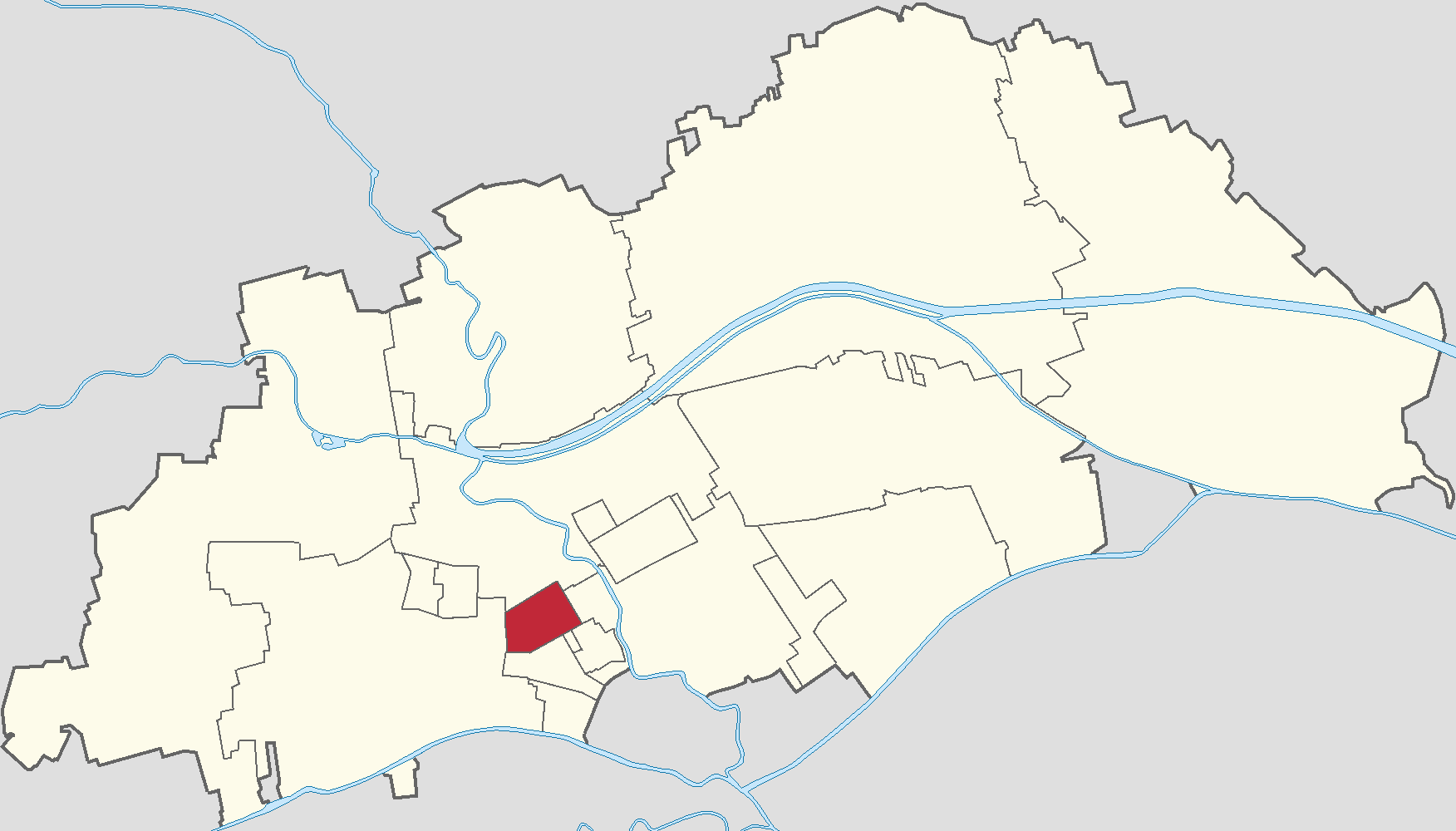
- Location of Ruijing Subdistrict within Beichen District

- Location within Tianjin Location within China
- Coordinates: 39°11′42″N 117°06′23″E
- Country: China
- Municipality: Tianjin
- District: Beichen
- Village-level Divisions: 11 communities

Area
  - Total: 3.66 km^{2} (1.41 sq mi)
- Elevation: 6 m (20 ft)

Population (2010)
  - Total: 72,842
  - Density: 19,900/km^{2} (51,500/sq mi)
- Time zone: UTC+8 (CST)
- Postal code: 300134
- Area code: 022

Ruijing Subdistrict (Chinese: 瑞景街道; pinyin: Ruìjǐng Jiēdào) is a subdistrict located on the southern portion of Beichen District, Tianjin, China. It is situated to the south of Beicang Town, west of Tianmu Town, north of Jiarongli and Shuanghuancun Subdistricts, and east of Qingguang Town. As of 2010, its population is 72,842.

In 2005, some territories from Tianmu, Qingguang and Beicang Towns were combined to from Jiarongli Subdistrict. Two years later, It was renamed to Ruijing Subdistrict. In 2012, southern part of Ruijing Subdistrict was separated and formed the current Jiarongli Subdistrict.

== Administrative divisions ==
As of 2022, Ruijing Subdistrict consists of 11 residential communities. They are organized into the list below:

- Shunchi Feicui Cheng (顺驰翡翠城)
- Aolin Pike Huayuan (奥林匹克花园)
- Ruikang (瑞康)
- Baocui Huadu (宝翠花都)
- Xinjing Yuan (熙景园)
- Kanjing Yuan (瞰景园)
- Ruiying Yuan (瑞盈园)
- Ruiyi Yuan (瑞益园)
- Zirui Yuan (紫瑞园)
- Qiurui Jiayuan (秋瑞家园)
- Jiangnan Chunse (江南春色)

== See also ==
- List of township-level divisions of Tianjin
