= Hepinglu station (Tianjin Metro) =

Metro station in Tianjin, China

Hepinglu 和平路
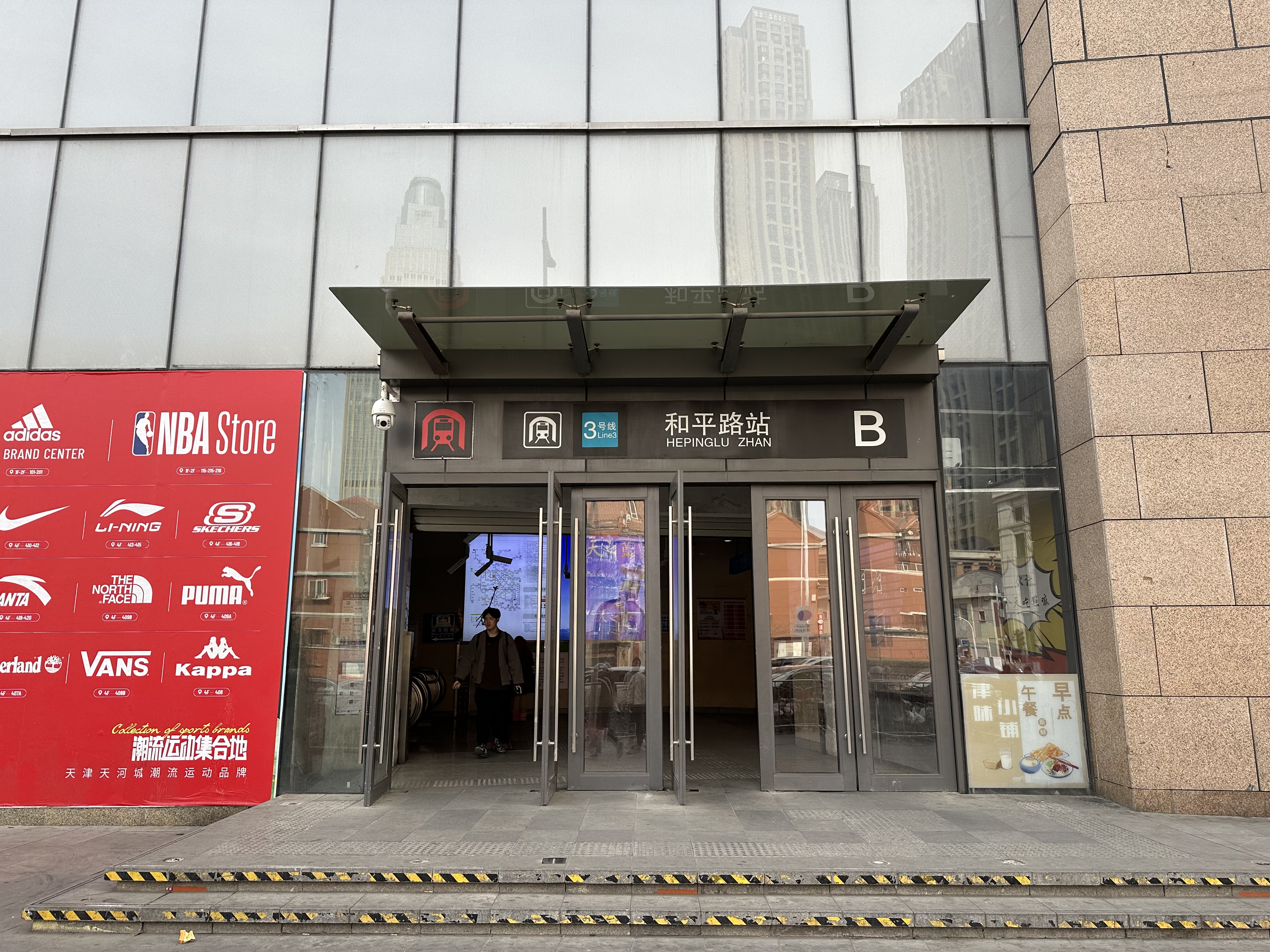
- Exit B of Hepinglu station

General information
- Location: Heping District, Tianjin; China
- Coordinates: 39.1259°N 117.1982°E
- Operator: Tianjin Metro Co. Ltd.
- Lines: Line 3 Line 4

Construction
- Structure type: Underground

History
- Opened: 1 October 2012 (Line 3); 28 December 2021 (Line 4)

Services
Preceding station	Tianjin Metro	Following station
Yingkoudao towards Nanzhan	Line 3	Jinwan'guangchang towards Xiaodian
Jinjie towards Xiaojie	Line 4	Xuzhoudao towards Xinxingcun
Location

Hepinglu station (Chinese: 和平路站; pinyin: Hépíng lù zhàn; lit. 'Heping Road station') is a station of Line 3 and Line 4 of the Tianjin Metro. It started operations on 1 October 2012.

Currently, due to continuous engineering, free transfer gateway between Line 3 and Line 4 isn't available, passengers that need transfer between two lines require an out-of-station transfer by using tickets other than oneway tickets within 30 minutes.

== Exits ==
Exit A: Tianjin Association for science and Technology

Exit B: Tianjin Stomatological Hospital

Exit C: Teemall

Exit D: Heping Road Shopping Street, Binjiang Ave. Shopping Street, Goubuli Shop, Central Park, Bohai Tower, China Unicom Business Center, Zhang Xueliang Historical Residence, and Porcelain House Museum.

Exit G: Siping East Ave. Primary School

Exit H: Siping East Ave. Primary School and Tianjin Stomatological Hospital

Exit E is currently closed for renovation. There are also numerous connections to the Tianjin public bus system. Tianjin Tower is located on Heping Road, about 500 meters from the station.
