= Zhangxingzhuang station =

Metro station in Tianjin, China

Zhangxingzhuang 张兴庄
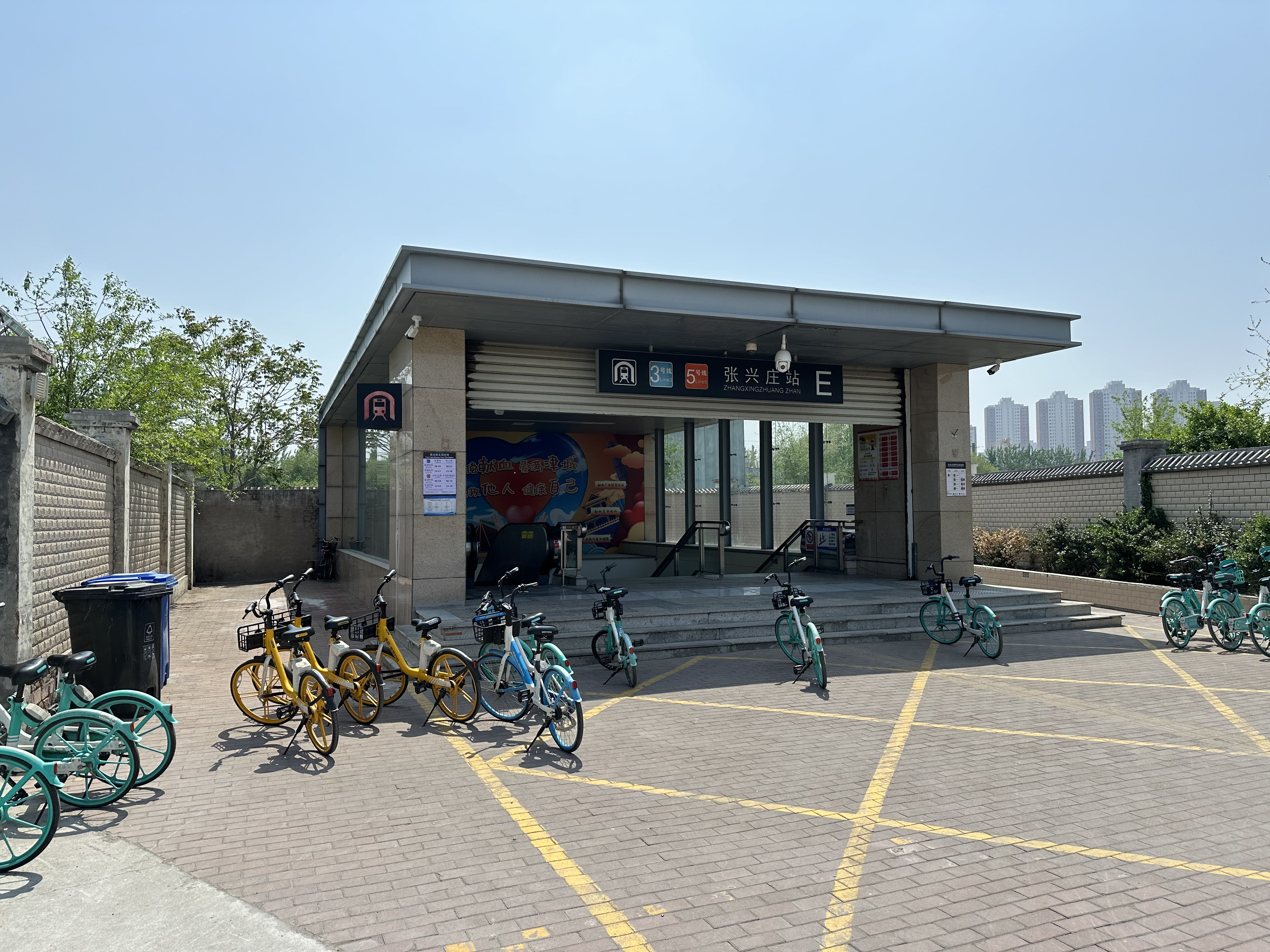
- Entrance E

General information
- Location: Hebei District, Tianjin; China
- Coordinates: 39.191505°N 117.208417°E
- Operator: Tianjin Metro Co. Ltd.
- Lines: Line 3 Line 5

Construction
- Structure type: Underground

History
- Opened: 1 October 2012 (Line 3); 22 October 2018 (Line 5)

Services
Preceding station	Tianjin Metro	Following station
Tiedonglu towards Nanzhan	Line 3	Yixingfu towards Xiaodian
Yixingfubei towards Beichenkejiyuanbei	Line 5	Zhichenglu towards Jinghuadongdao
Location

Zhangxingzhuang Station (Chinese: 张兴庄站) is a station of Line 3 and Line 5 of the Tianjin Metro. It started operations on 1 October 2012.
