= Zhoudengji'nianguan station =

Metro station in Tianjin, China

Coordinates: 39.0927°N 117.1636°E

Zhoudengji'nianguan 周邓纪念馆
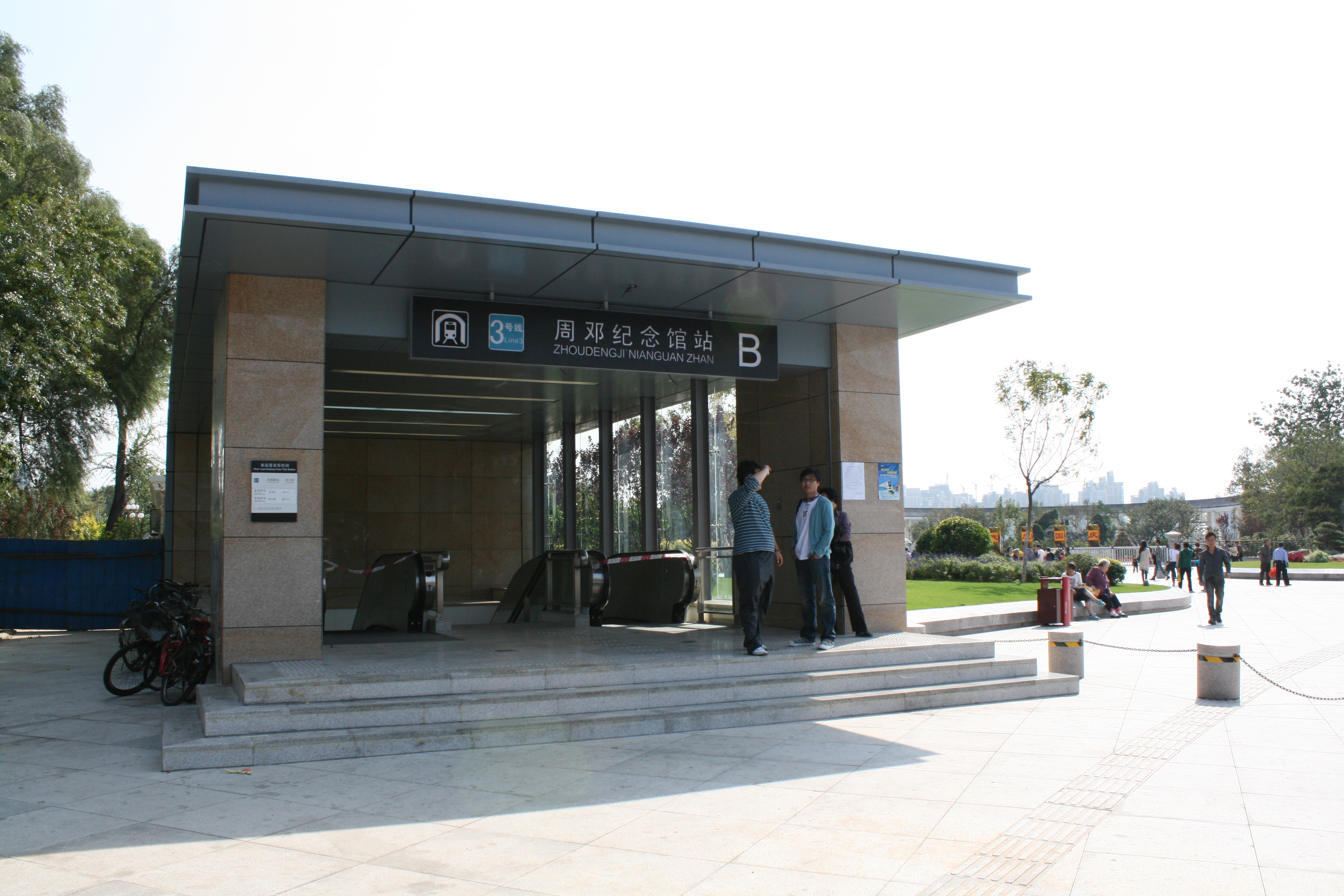

General information
- Other names: Zhou Enlai and Deng Yingchao Memorial Hall
- Location: Nankai District, Tianjin; China
- Operated by: Tianjin Metro Co. Ltd.
- Line(s): Line 3

Construction
- Structure type: Underground

History
- Opened: 1 October 2012

Services
Preceding station	Tianjin Metro	Following station
Hongqinanlu towards Nanzhan	Line 3	Tianta towards Xiaodian

Zhoudengji'nianguan station (Chinese: 周邓纪念馆站; lit. 'Zhou Enlai and Deng Yingchao Memorial Hall station') is a station of Line 3 of the Tianjin Metro. It started operations on 1 October 2012.
