= Yixingfu station =

Metro station in Tianjin, China

Yixingfu 宜兴埠
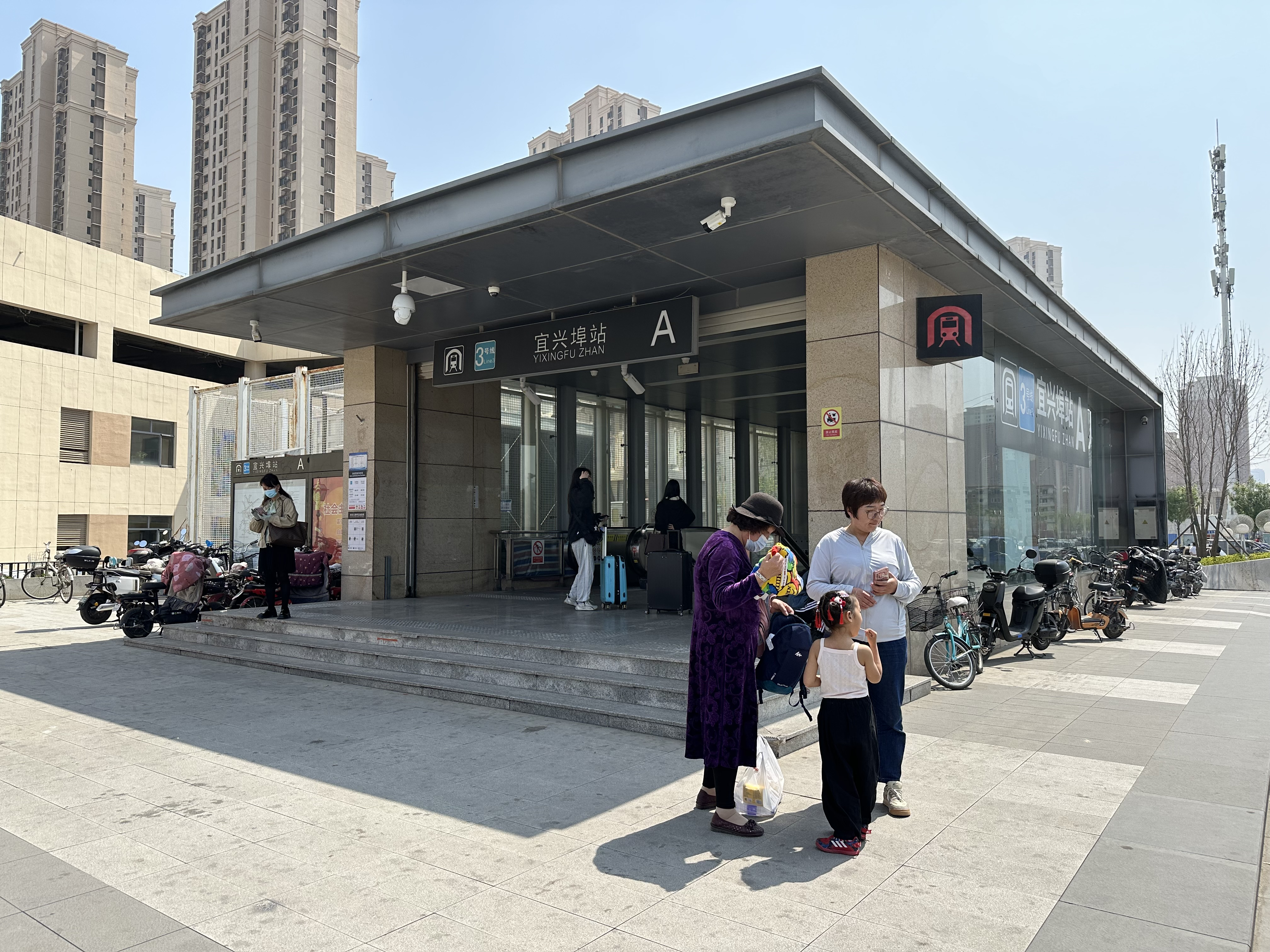
- Exit A

General information
- Location: Beichen District, Tianjin; China
- Operator: Tianjin Metro Co. Ltd.
- Line: Line 3

Construction
- Structure type: Underground

History
- Opened: 1 October 2012

Services
Preceding station	Tianjin Metro	Following station
Zhangxingzhuang towards Nanzhan	Line 3	Tianshili towards Xiaodian
Location

Yixingfu Station (Chinese: 宜兴埠站) is a station of Line 3 of the Tianjin Metro. It started operations on 1 October 2012.
