= Beizhan station =

Metro station in Tianjin, China

Beizhan 北站
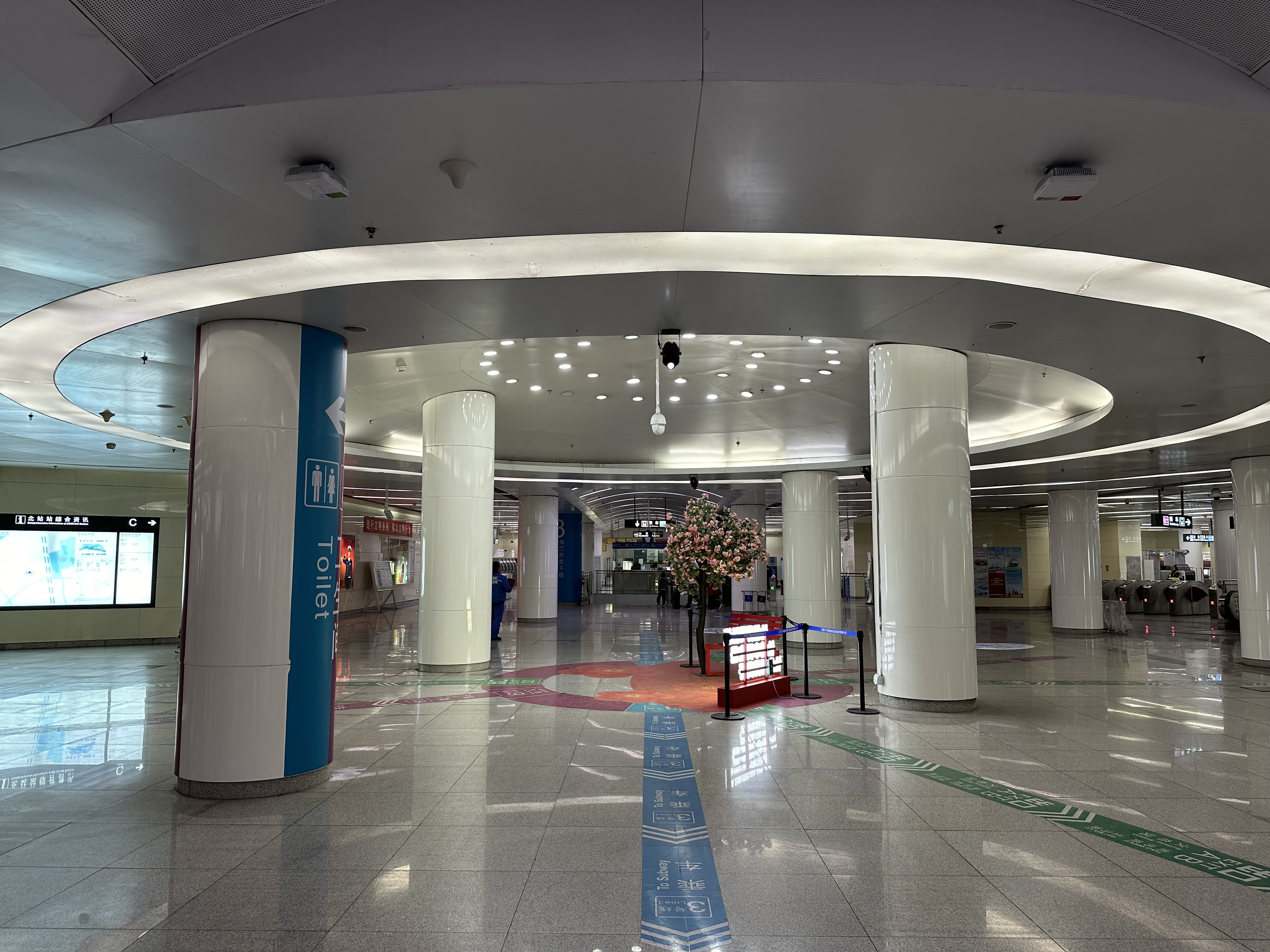
- Concourse

General information
- Other names: Tianjin North Railway Station
- Location: Hebei District, Tianjin; China
- Coordinates: 39.16557°N 117.20156°E
- Operator: Tianjin Metro Co. Ltd.
- Lines: Line 3 Line 6

Construction
- Structure type: Underground

History
- Opened: 1 October 2012 (Line 3); 31 December 2016 (Line 6)

Services
Preceding station	Tianjin Metro	Following station
Zhongshanlu towards Nanzhan	Line 3	Tiedonglu towards Xiaodian
Beininggongyuan towards Nansunzhuang	Line 6	Xinkaihe towards Lushuidao
Location

Beizhan Station (Chinese: 北站站), literally Tianjin North Railway Station Station in English, is a station of Line 3 and Line 6 of the Tianjin Metro. It started operations on 1 October 2012.
