= Daxuecheng station (Tianjin Metro) =

Metro station in Tianjin, China

Daxuecheng 大学城
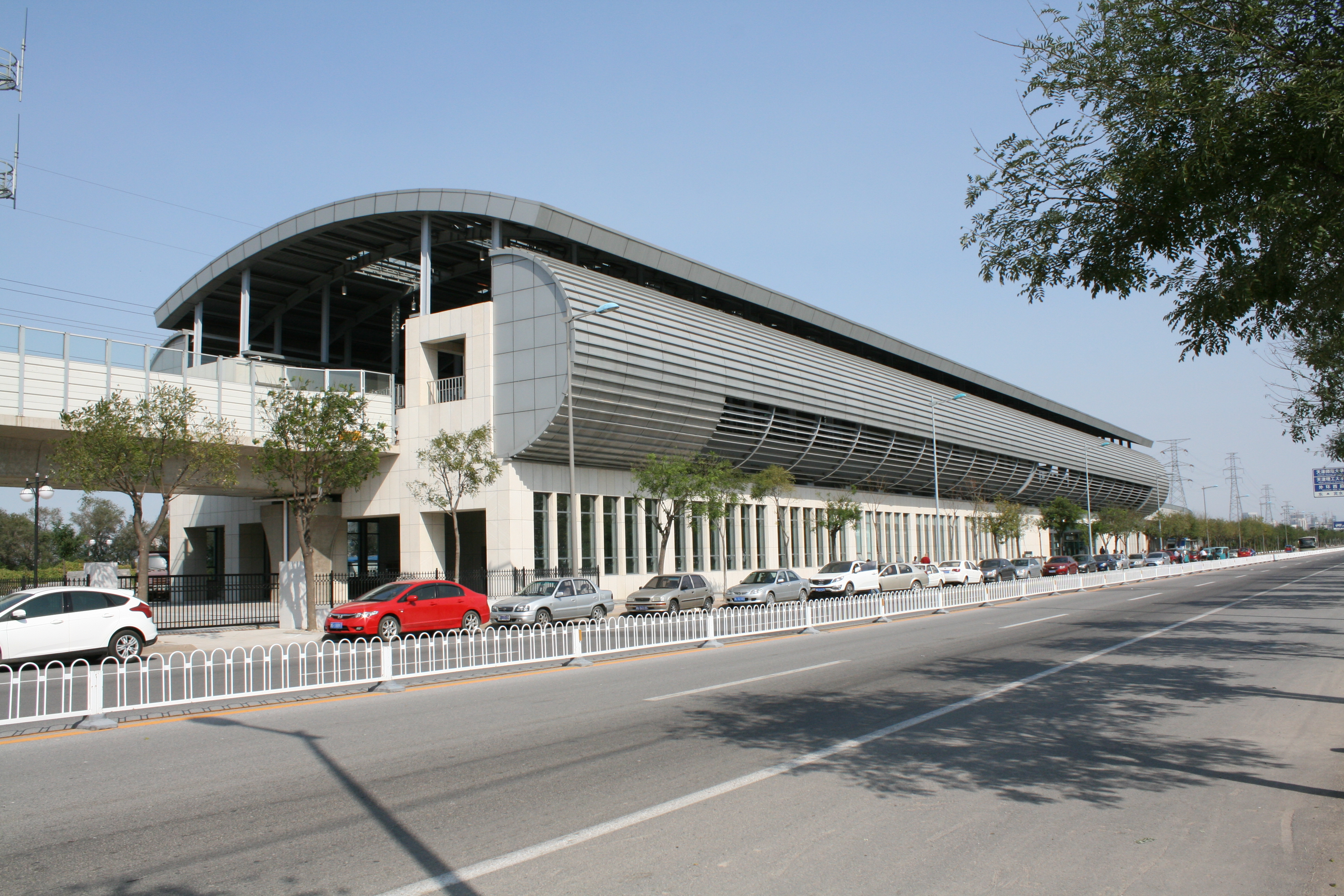

General information
- Other names: University Town Station; Higher Education Mega Center
- Location: Xiqing District, Tianjin; China
- Coordinates: 39.07127°N 117.10569°E
- Operator: Tianjin Metro Co. Ltd.
- Line: Line 3

Construction
- Structure type: Elevated

History
- Opened: 1 October 2012

Services
Preceding station	Tianjin Metro	Following station
Gaoxinqu towards Nanzhan	Line 3	Huayuan towards Xiaodian
Location

Daxuecheng Station (Chinese: 大学城站), literally University Town Station or Higher Education Mega Center Station in English, is a station of Line 3 of the Tianjin Metro, Tianjin, China. It started operations on 1 October 2012.
