= Hongqinanlu station =

Metro station in Tianjin, China

Hongqinanlu 红旗南路
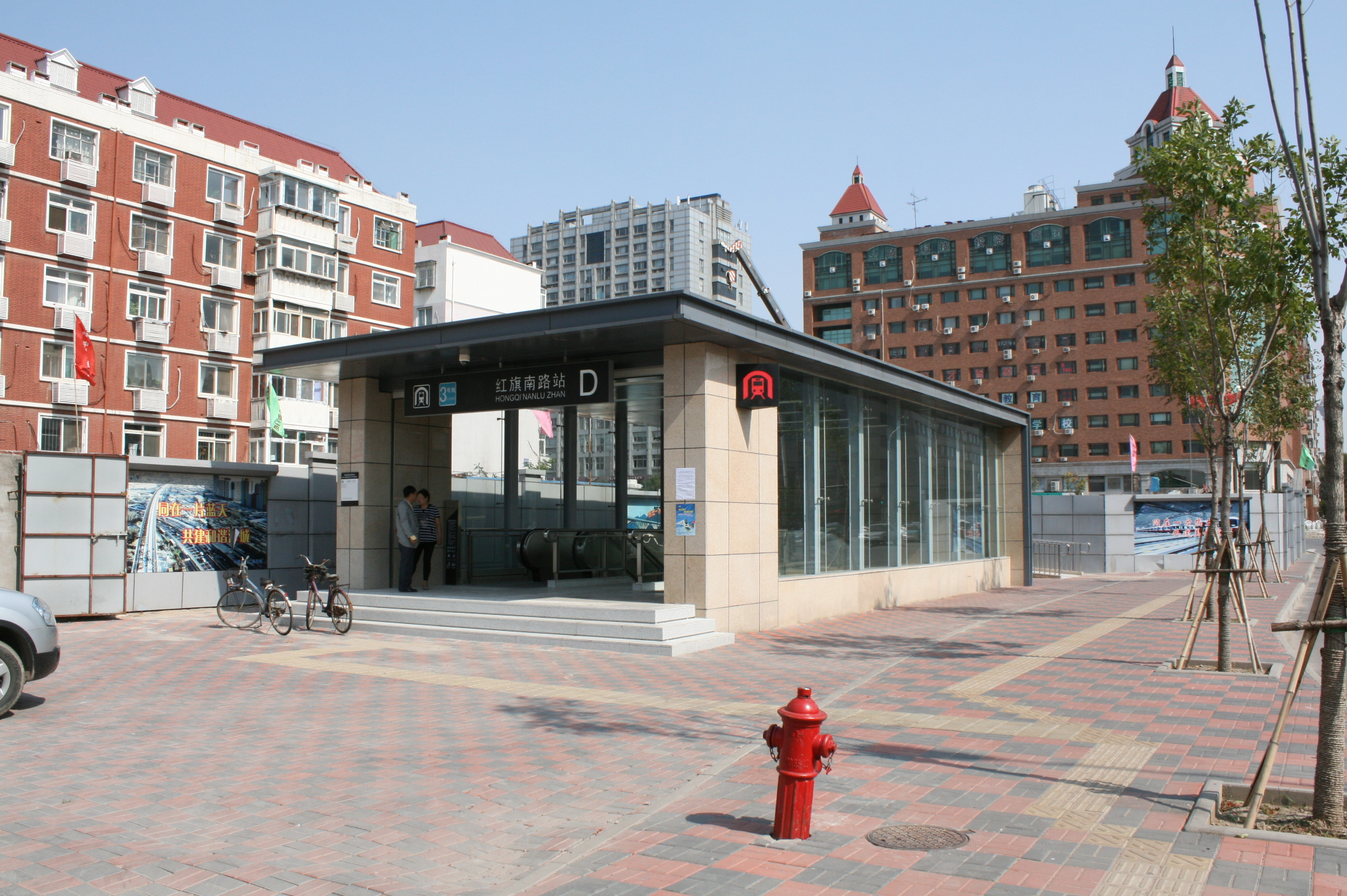

General information
- Other names: South Hongqi Road
- Location: Nankai District, Tianjin; China
- Operator: Tianjin Metro Co. Ltd.
- Lines: Line 3 Line 6

Construction
- Structure type: Underground

History
- Opened: 1 October 2012 (Line 3); 6 August 2016 (Line 6)

Services
Preceding station	Tianjin Metro	Following station
Wangdingdi towards Nanzhan	Line 3	Zhoudengji'nianguan towards Xiaodian
Yizhongxinyiyuan towards Nansunzhuang	Line 6	Yingfengdao towards Lushuidao
Location

Hongqinanlu station (Chinese: 红旗南路站; lit. 'South Hongqi Road station') is a station of Line 3 and Line 6 of the Tianjin Metro in Tianjin, China. It started operations on 1 October 2012.
