= Wujiayao station =

Metro station in Tianjin, China

Wujiayao 吴家窑
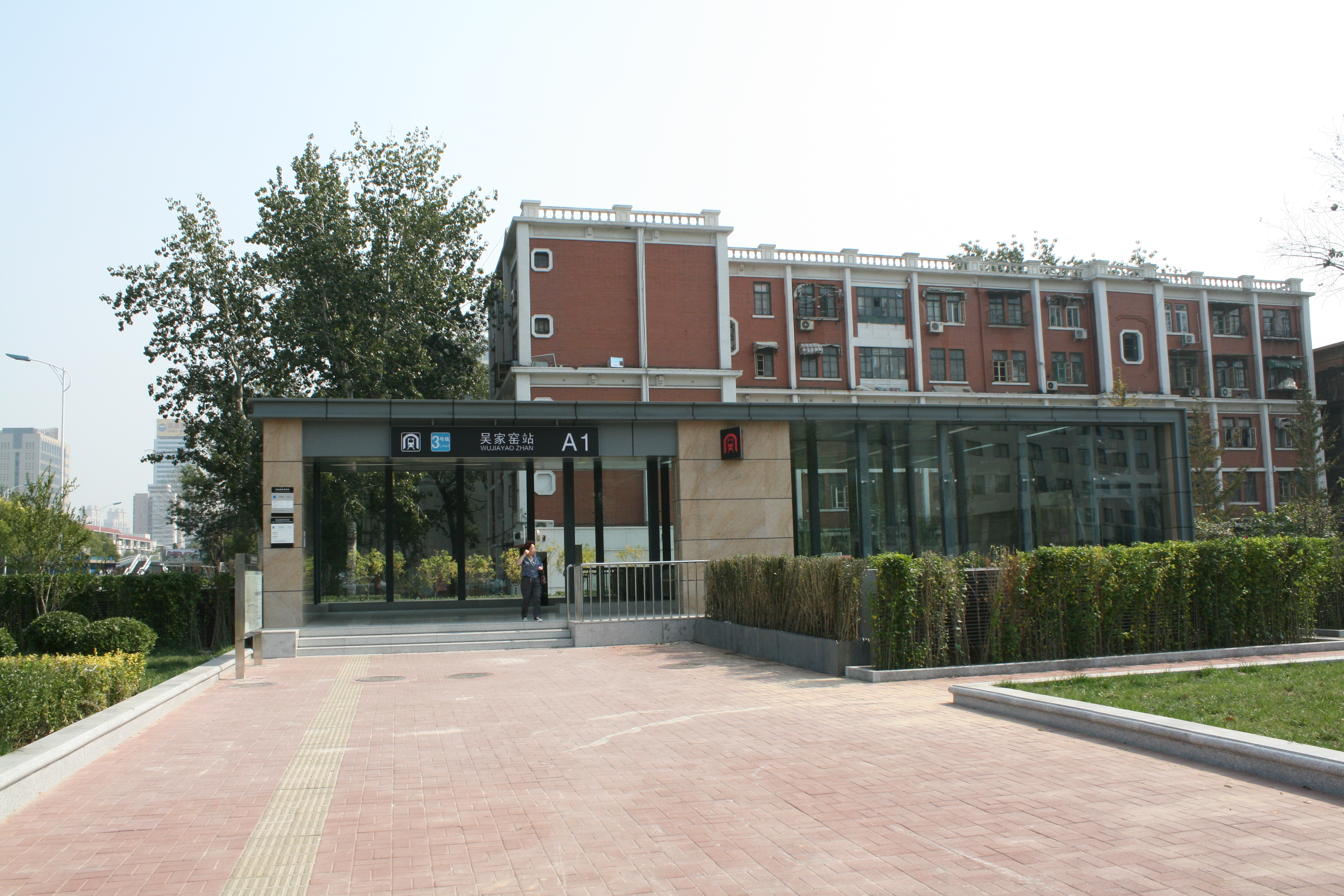

General information
- Location: Hexi District and Heping District, Tianjin; China
- Operator: Tianjin Metro Co. Ltd.
- Lines: Line 3; Line 11

Construction
- Structure type: Underground

History
- Opened: 1 October 2012 (Line 3); 28 December 2024 (Line 11)

Services
Preceding station	Tianjin Metro	Following station
Tianta towards Nanzhan	Line 3	Xikanglu towards Xiaodian
Nankaidaxuebalitai towards Shuishanggongyuanxilu	Line 11	Tonglou towards Dongliliujinglu
Location

Wujiayao station (Chinese: 吴家窑站) is a station of Line 3 and Line 11 of the Tianjin Metro. It started operations on 1 October 2012. Line 11 began serving the station on 28 December 2024.
