= Tianta station =

Metro station in Tianjin, China

Tianta 天塔
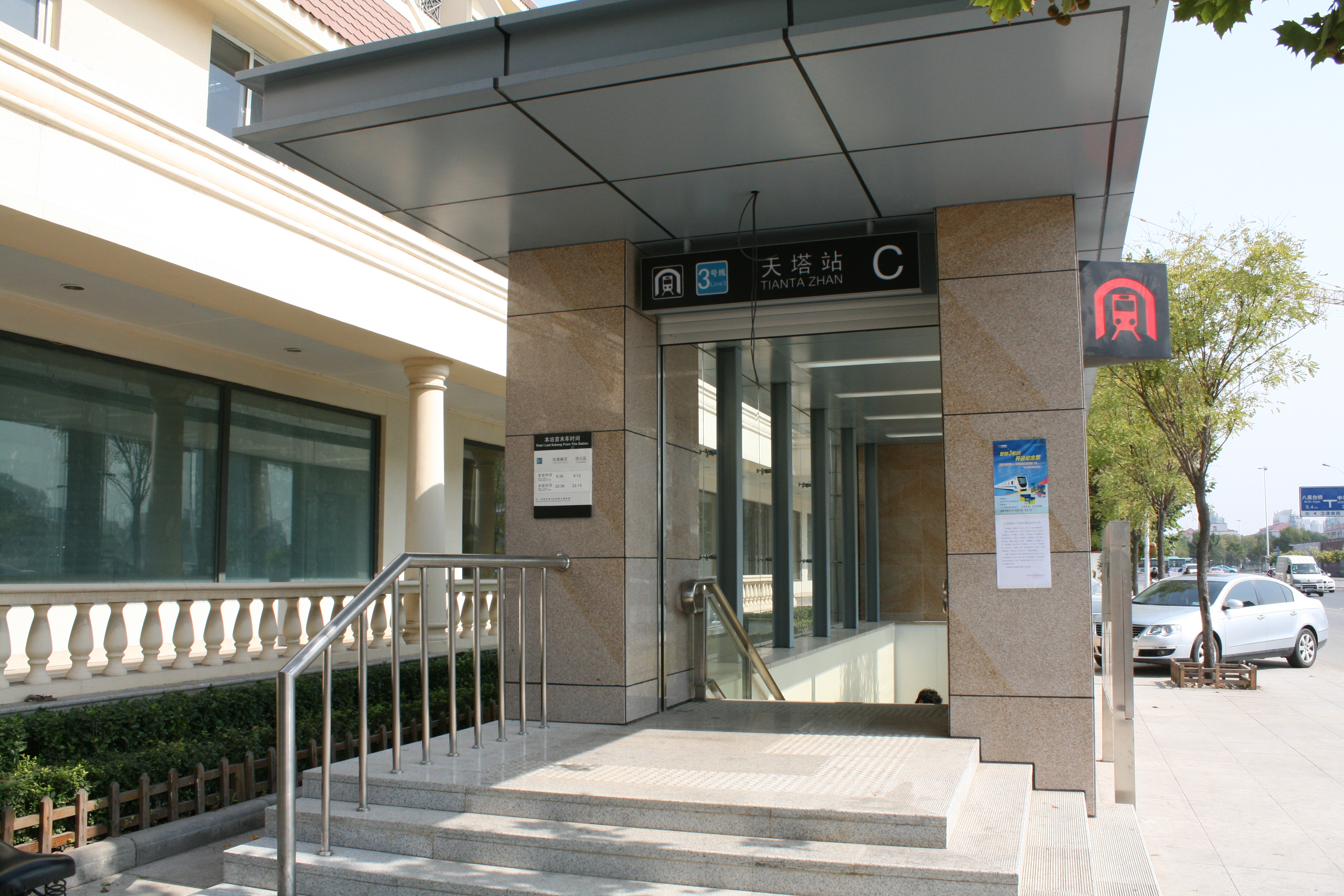

General information
- Other names: Tianjin Radio and Television Tower
- Location: Nankai District, Tianjin; China
- Operator: Tianjin Metro Co. Ltd.
- Lines: Line 3 Line 7

Construction
- Structure type: Underground

History
- Opened: 1 October 2012 (Line 3); 28 September 2025 (Line 7)

Services
Preceding station	Tianjin Metro	Following station
Zhoudengji'nianguan towards Nanzhan	Line 3	Wujiayao towards Xiaodian
Nankaidaxuebalitai towards Gulou	Line 7	Zhongliuyiyuan towards Saidalu
Location

Tianta station (Chinese: 天塔站; lit. 'Tianjin Radio and Television Tower station') is a station of Line 3 and Line 7 of the Tianjin Metro. It started operations on 1 October 2012.
