= Tiedonglu station =

Metro station in Tianjin, China

Tiedonglu 铁东路
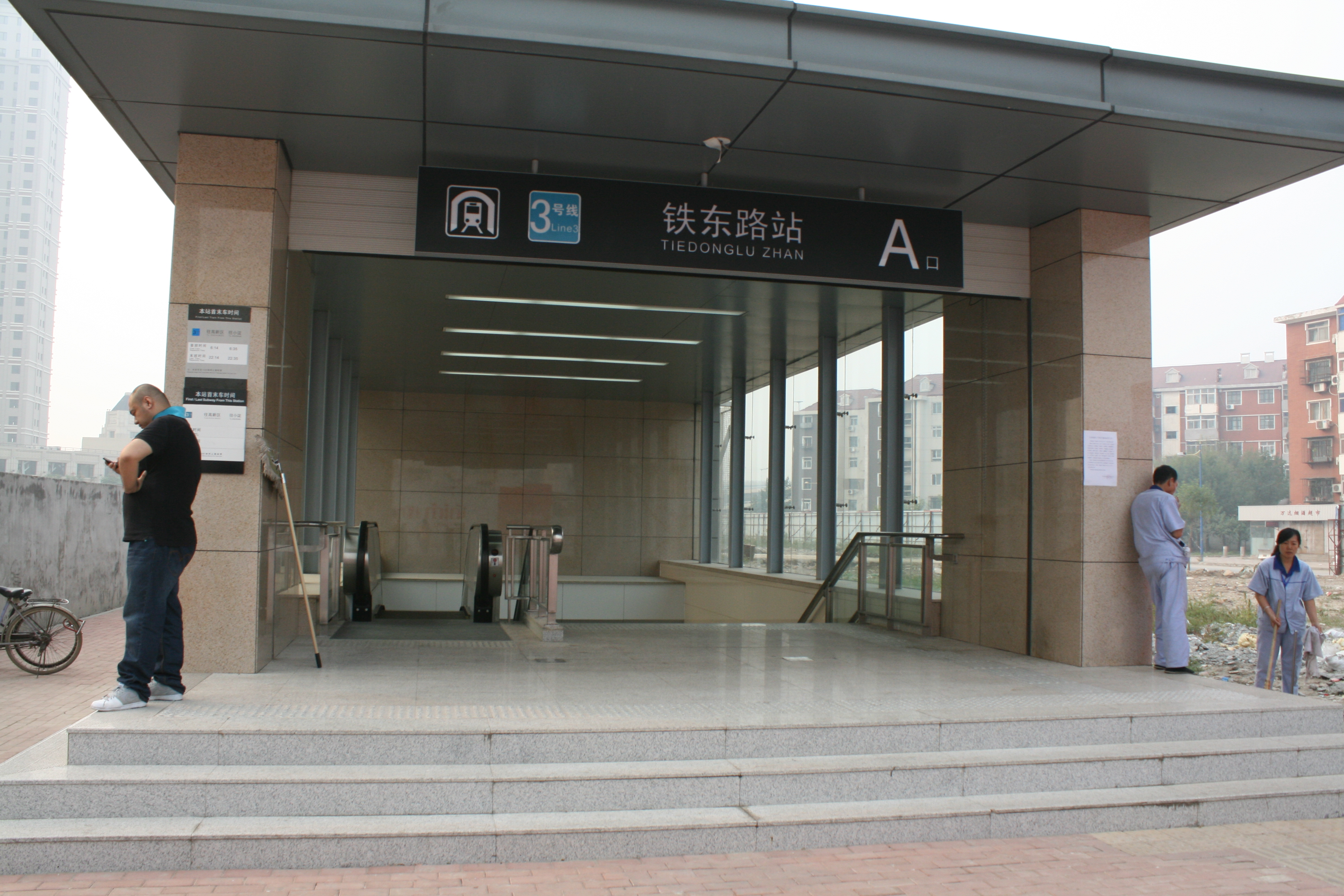

General information
- Other names: Tiedong Road
- Location: Hebei District, Tianjin; China
- Coordinates: 39.1791°N 117.2010°E
- Operator: Tianjin Metro Co. Ltd.
- Line: Line 3

Construction
- Structure type: Underground

History
- Opened: 1 October 2012

Services
Preceding station	Tianjin Metro	Following station
Beizhan towards Nanzhan	Line 3	Zhangxingzhuang towards Xiaodian
Location

Tiedonglu Station (Chinese: 铁东路站), literally Tiedong Road Station in English, is a station of Line 3 of the Tianjin Metro. It started operations on 1 October 2012.
