= Jinwan'guangchang station =

Metro station in Tianjin, China

Jinwan'guangchang 津湾广场
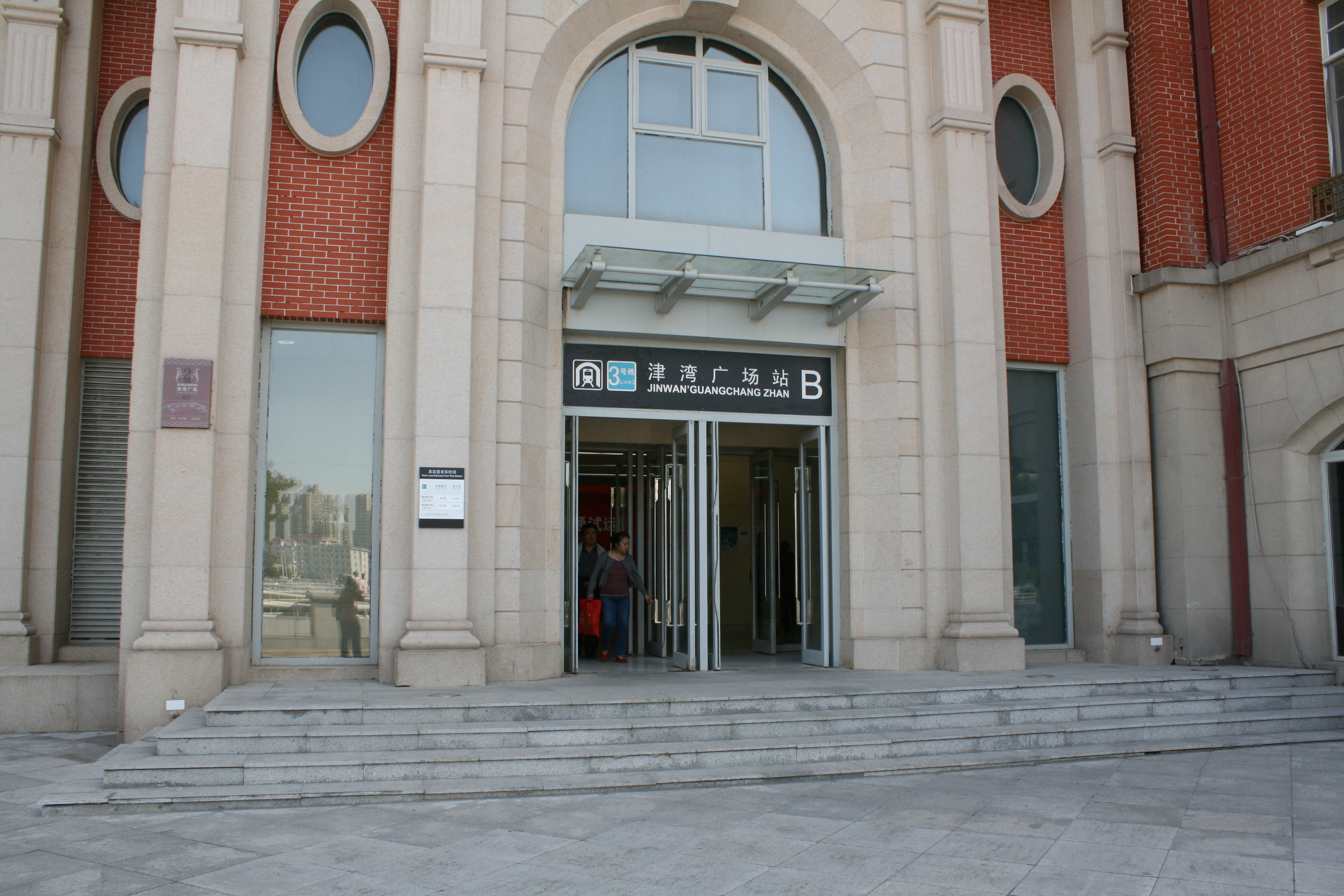

General information
- Other names: Jinwan Plaza station Jinwan Square station
- Location: Heping District, Tianjin; China
- Operator: Tianjin Metro Co. Ltd.
- Line: Line 3

Construction
- Structure type: Underground

History
- Opened: 1 October 2012

Services
Preceding station	Tianjin Metro	Following station
Hepinglu towards Nanzhan	Line 3	Tianjinzhan towards Xiaodian
Location

Jinwan'guangchang station (Chinese: 津湾广场站; lit. 'Jinwan Plaza station or Jinwan Square station') is a station of Line 3 of the Tianjin Metro. It started operations on 1 October 2012.
