= Huabeijituan station =

Metro station in Tianjin, China

Huabeijituan 华北集团
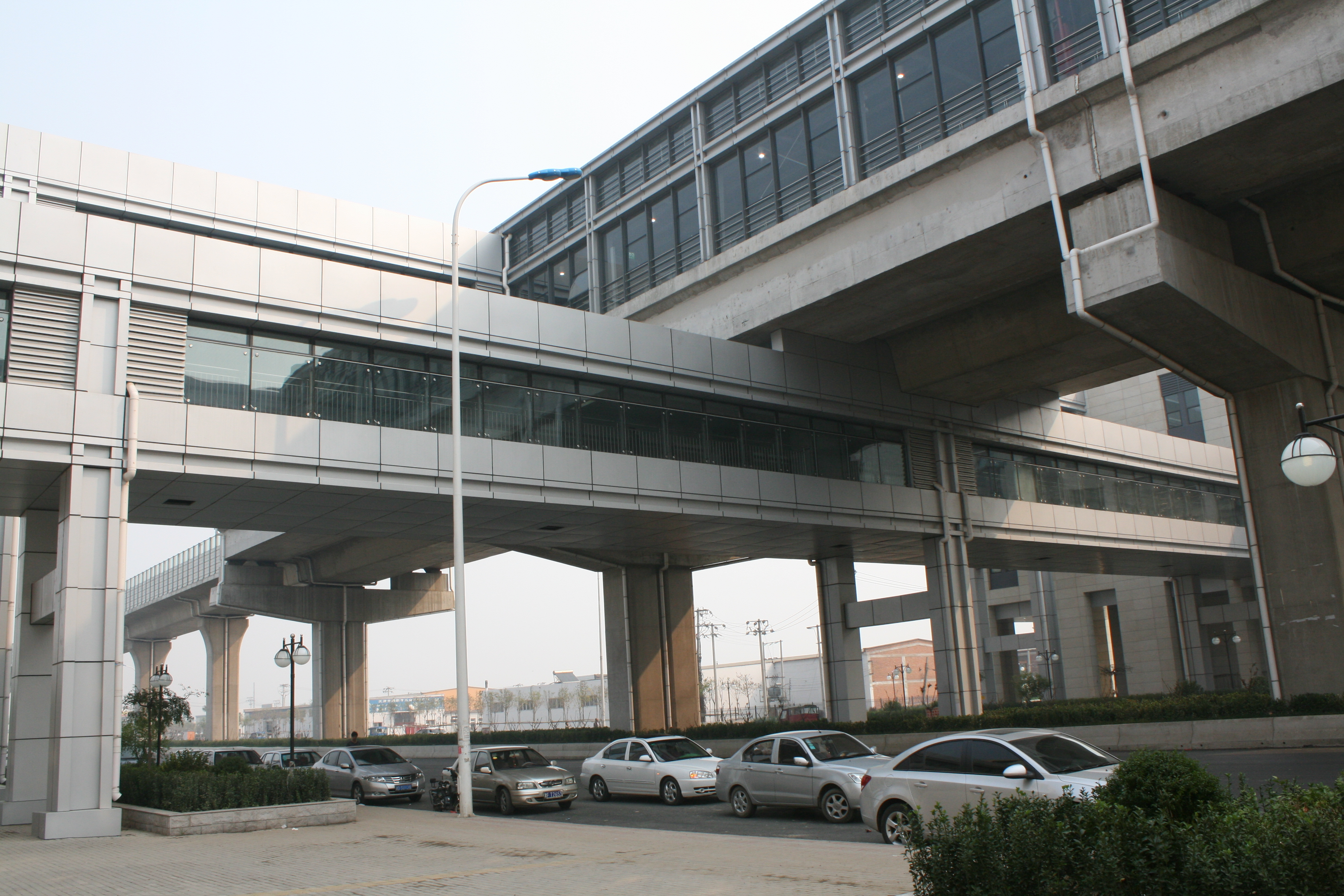

General information
- Other names: Huabei Group
- Location: Beichen District, Tianjin; China
- Operator: Tianjin Metro Co. Ltd.
- Line: Line 3

Construction
- Structure type: Elevated

History
- Opened: 1 October 2012

Services
Preceding station	Tianjin Metro	Following station
Tianshili towards Nanzhan	Line 3	Fengchanhe towards Xiaodian
Location

Huabeijituan Station (Chinese: 华北集团站), literally Huabei Group Station in English, is a station of Line 3 of the Tianjin Metro. It started operations on 1 October 2012.
