= Huayuan station (Tianjin Metro) =

Metro station in Tianjin, China

Huayuan 华苑
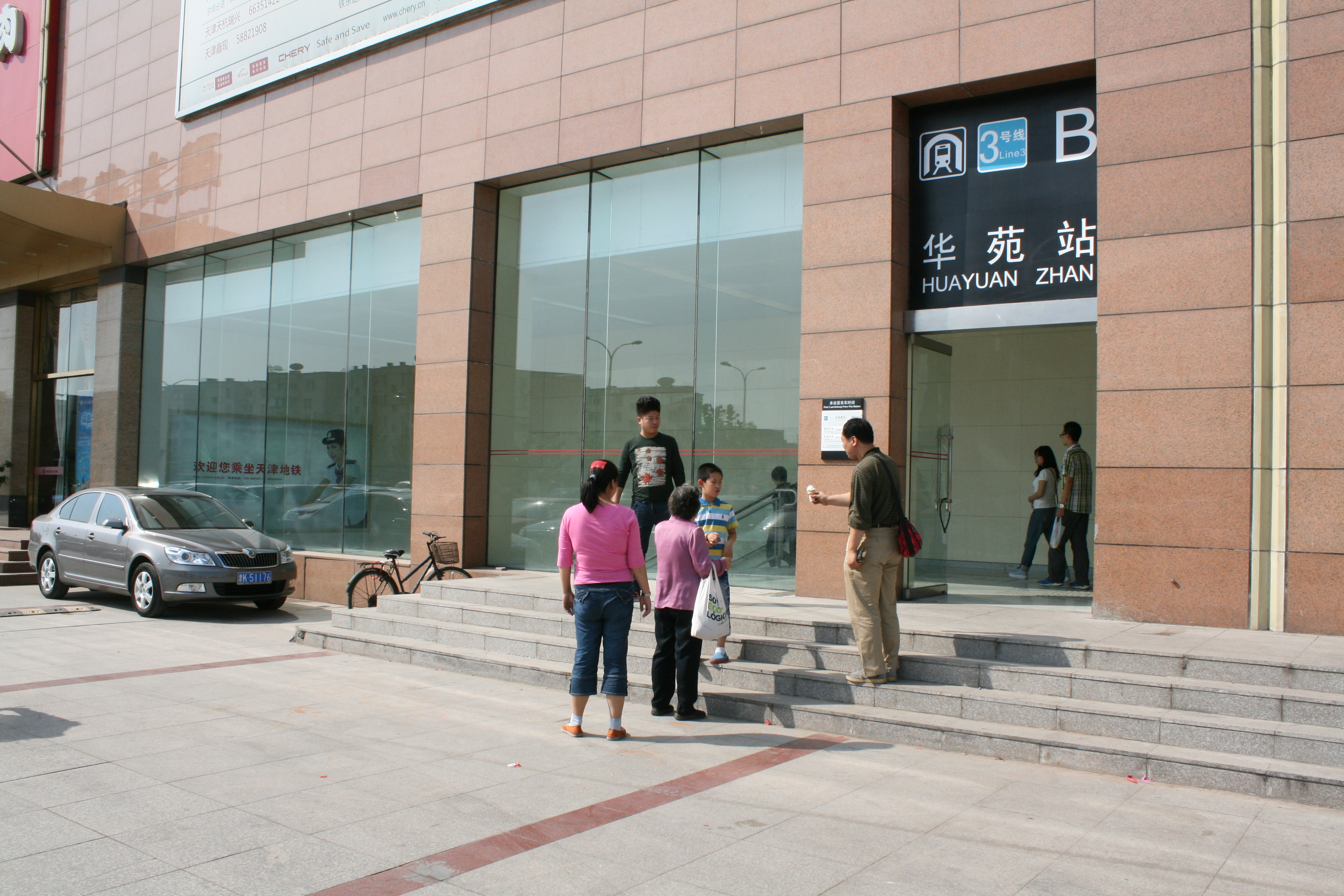

General information
- Location: Nankai District, Tianjin; China
- Coordinates: 39°05′10″N 117°07′20″E
- Operated by: Tianjin Metro Co. Ltd.
- Line: Line 3

Construction
- Structure type: Underground

History
- Opened: 1 October 2012

Services
Preceding station	Tianjin Metro	Following station
Daxuecheng towards Nanzhan	Line 3	Wangdingdi towards Xiaodian
Location

Huayuan Station (Chinese: 华苑站) is a station of Line 3 of the Tianjin Metro. It started operations on 1 October 2012.
