= Gaoxinqu station =

Metro station in Tianjin, China

Gaoxinqu 高新区
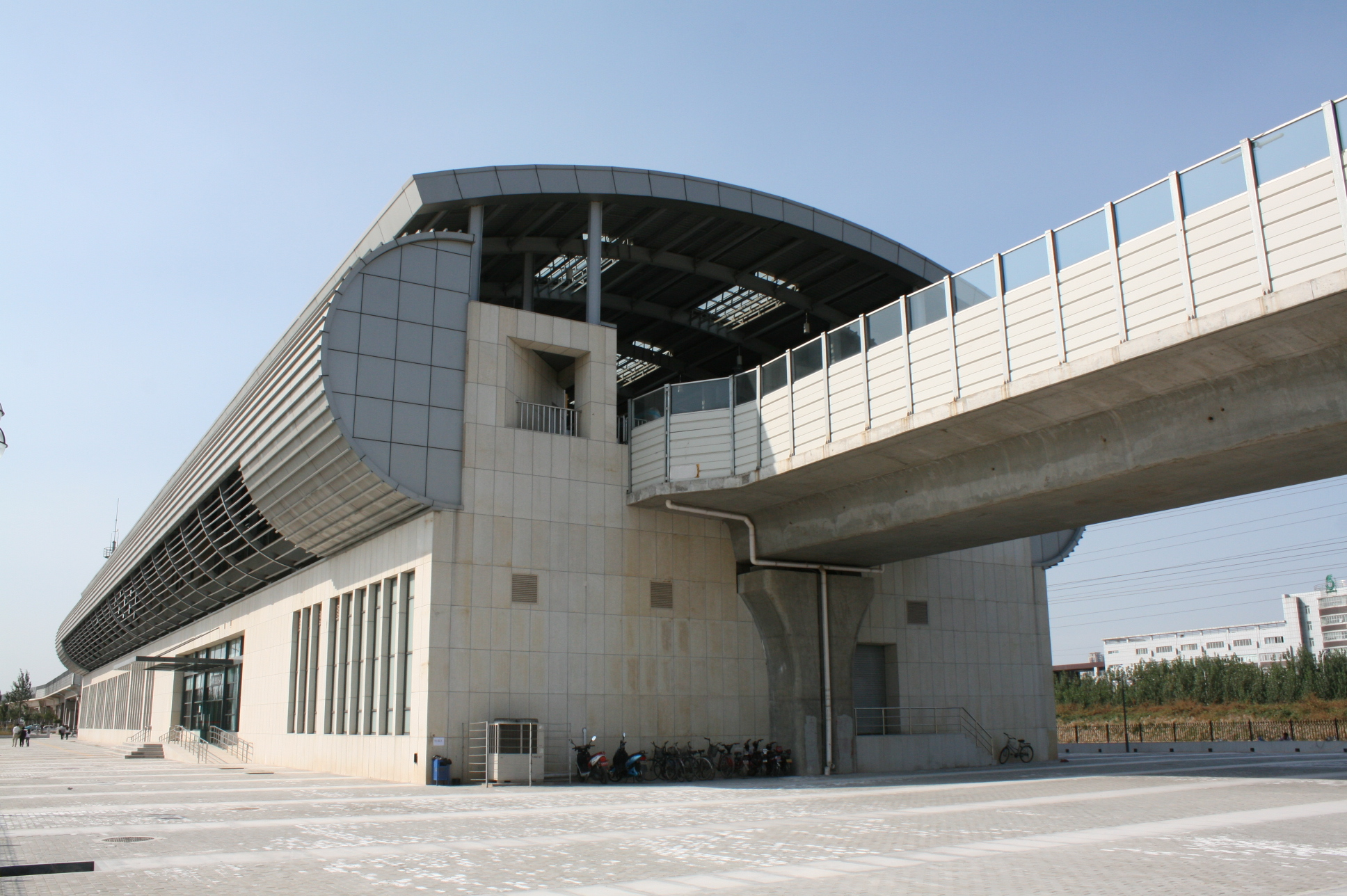

General information
- Other names: Hi-tech Industrial Development Area
- Location: Xiqing District, Tianjin; China
- Coordinates: 39.0708°N 117.0922°E
- Operator: Tianjin Metro Co. Ltd.
- Line: Line 3

Construction
- Structure type: Elevated

History
- Opened: 1 October 2012

Services
Preceding station	Tianjin Metro	Following station
Xuefugongyequ towards Nanzhan	Line 3	Daxuecheng towards Xiaodian
Location

Gaoxinqu Station (Chinese: 高新区站), literally Hi-tech Industrial Development Area Station in English, is a station of Line 3 of the Tianjin Metro. It started operations on 1 October 2012.
