= Zhongshanlu station =

Tianjin Metro station

Zhongshanlu 中山路
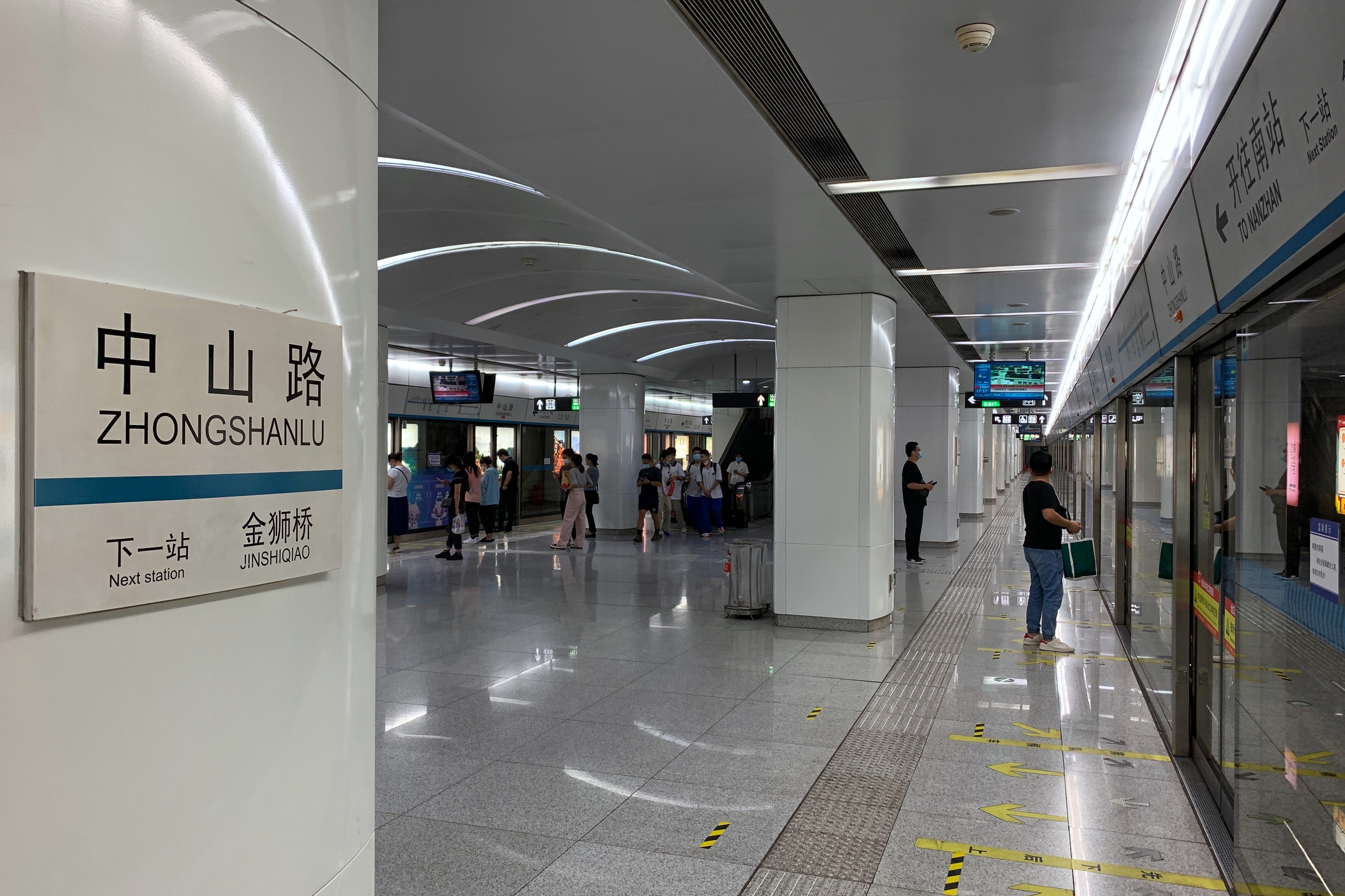

General information
- Other names: Zhongshan Road
- Location: Hebei District, Tianjin; China
- Coordinates: 39.1607°N 117.19929°E
- Operator: Tianjin Metro Co. Ltd.
- Line: Line 3

Construction
- Structure type: Underground

History
- Opened: 1 October 2012

Services
Preceding station	Tianjin Metro	Following station
Jinshiqiao towards Nanzhan	Line 3	Beizhan towards Xiaodian
Location

Zhongshanlu Station (Chinese: 中山路站), literally Zhongshan Road Station in English, is a station of Line 3 of the Tianjin Metro. It started operations on 1 October 2012.
