= Wangdingdi station =

Metro station in Tianjin, China

Wangdingdi 王顶堤
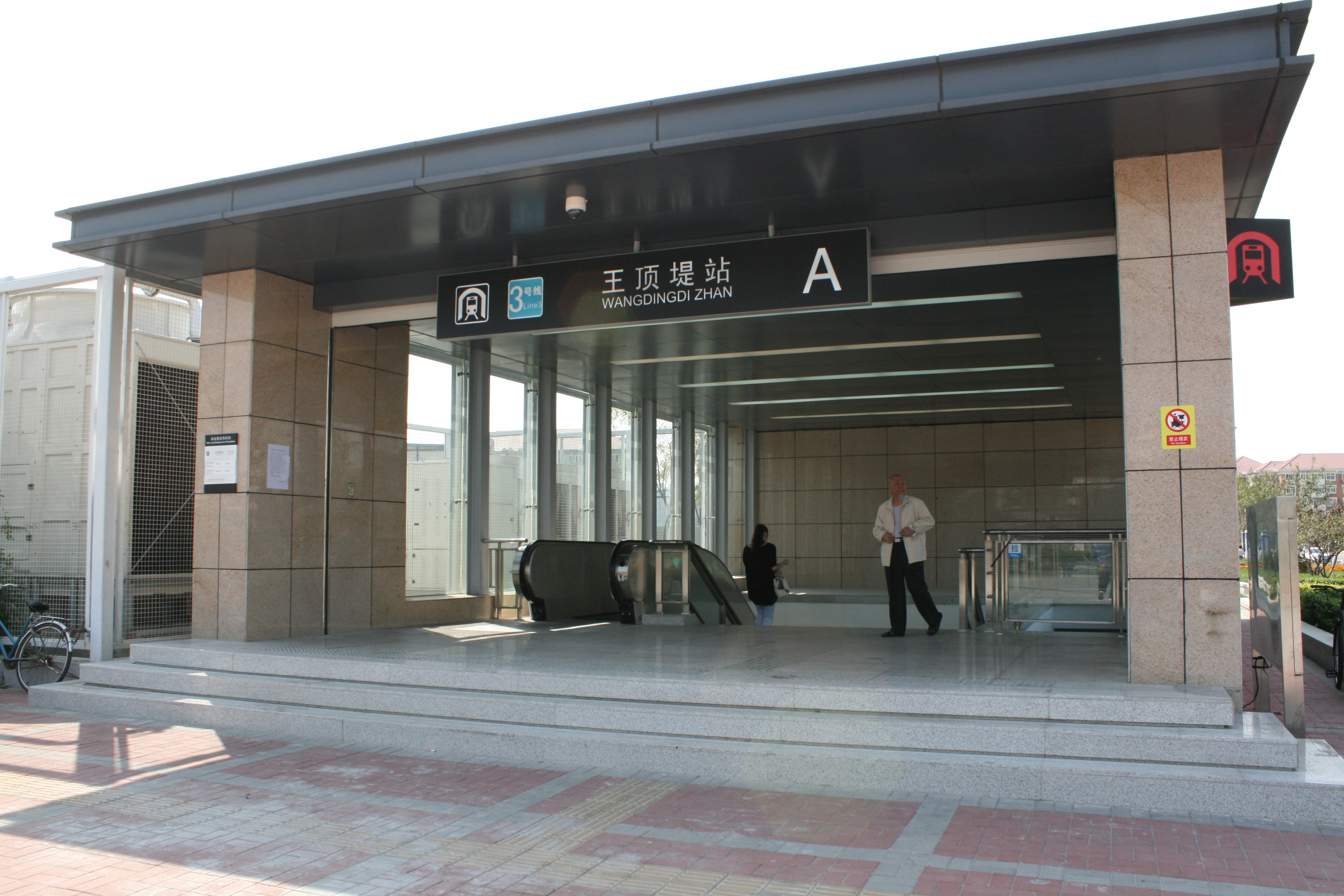

General information
- Location: Nankai District, Tianjin; China
- Coordinates: 39.0907°N 117.1319°E
- Operator: Tianjin Metro Co. Ltd.
- Line: Line 3

Construction
- Structure type: Underground

History
- Opened: 1 October 2012

Services
Preceding station	Tianjin Metro	Following station
Huayuan towards Nanzhan	Line 3	Hongqinanlu towards Xiaodian
Location

Wangdingdi Station (Chinese: 王顶堤站) is a station of Line 3 of the Tianjin Metro. It started operations on 1 October 2012.
