= Xuefugongyequ station =

Metro station in Tianjin, China

Xuefugongyequ 学府工业区
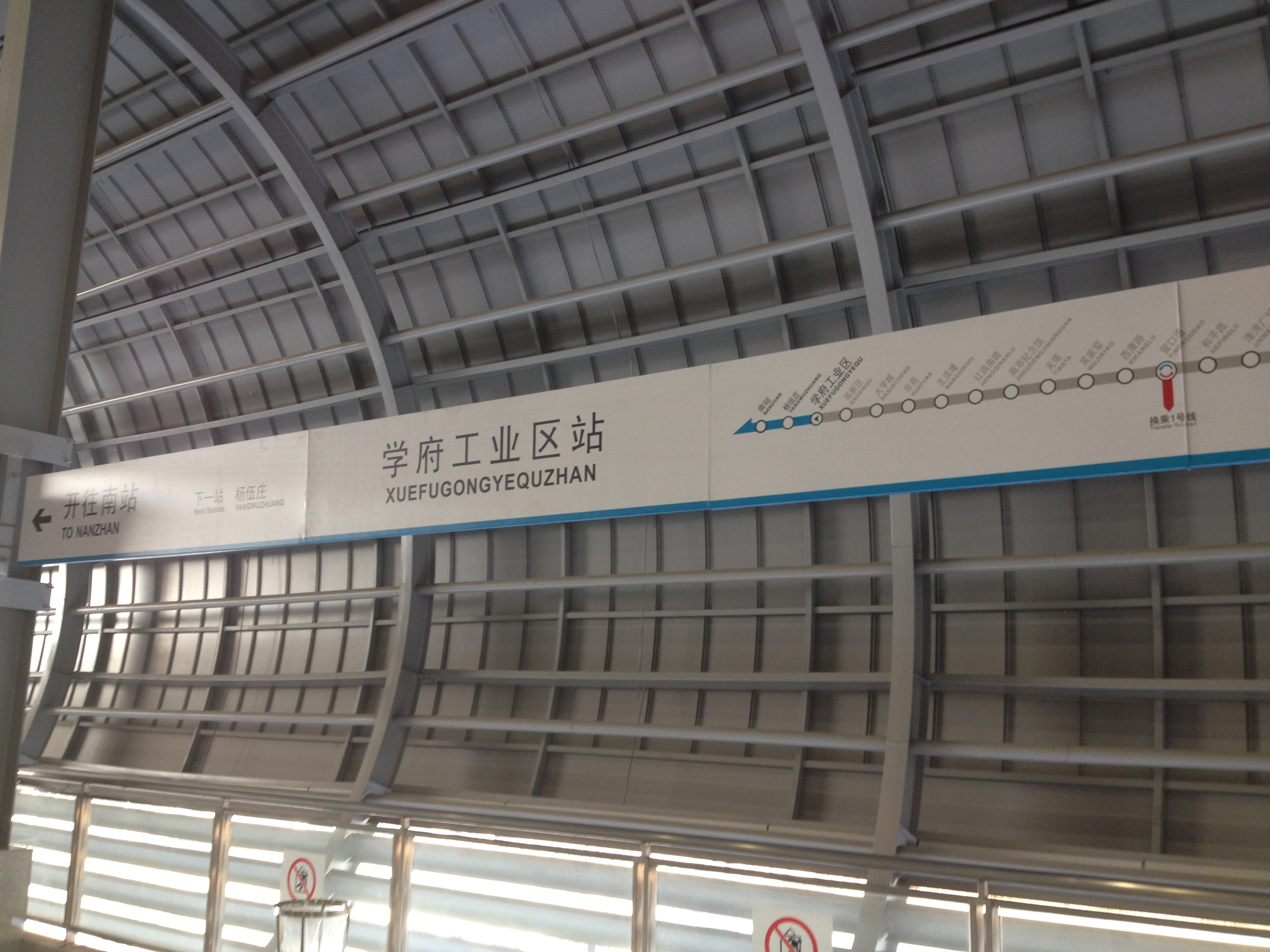

General information
- Location: Xiqing District, Tianjin; China
- Coordinates: 39.0707249°N 117.0721867°E
- Operated by: Tianjin Metro Co. Ltd.
- Line(s): Line 3

Construction
- Structure type: Elevated

History
- Opened: 28 December 2013

Services
Preceding station	Tianjin Metro	Following station
Yangwuzhuang towards Nanzhan	Line 3	Gaoxinqu towards Xiaodian

Xuefugongyequ Station (Chinese: 学府工业区站) is a station of Line 3 of the Tianjin Metro in China. It started operations on 28 December 2013.
