= Jinshiqiao station =

Metro station in Tianjin, China

Jinshiqiao 金狮桥
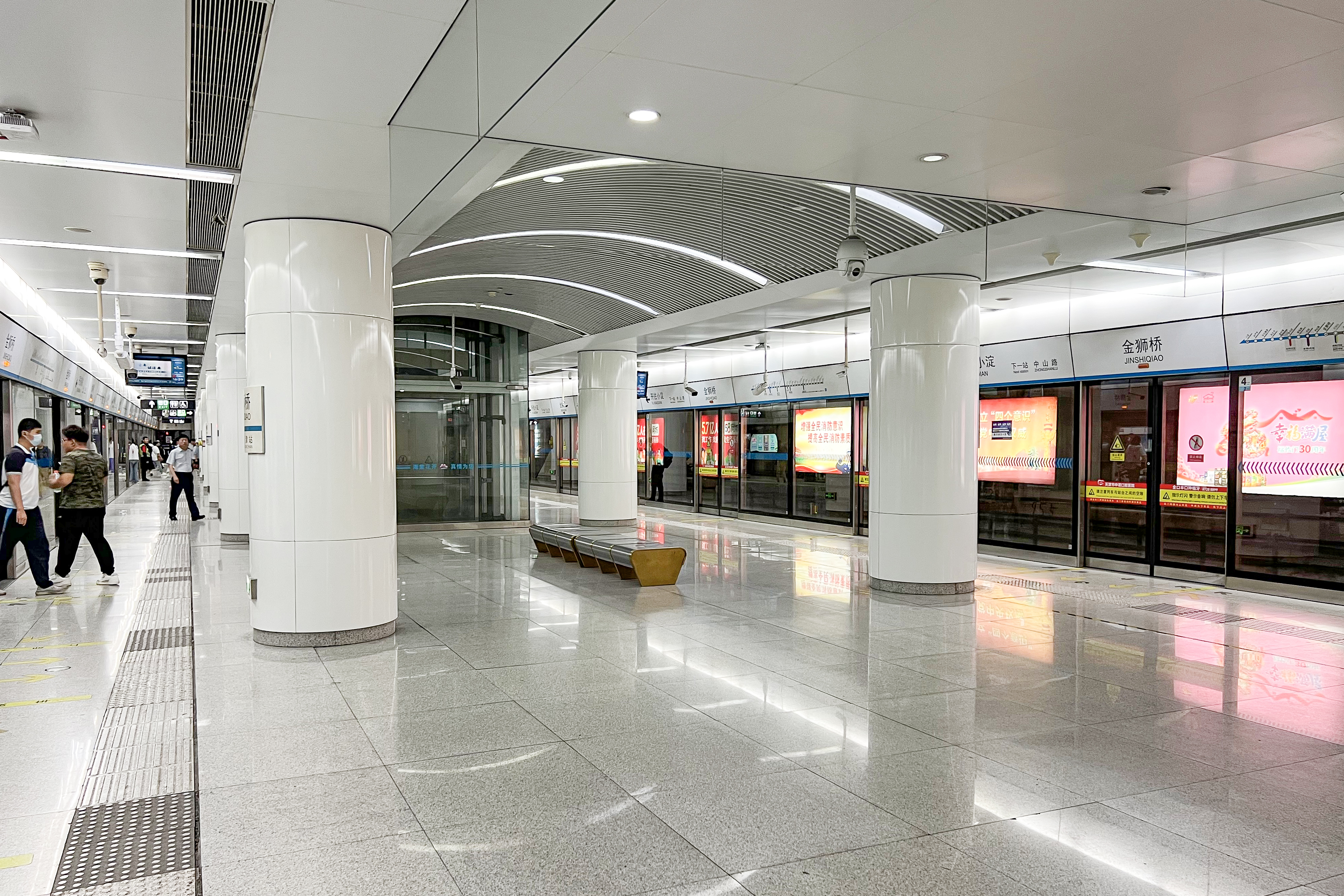
- Platform in May 2024

General information
- Location: Hebei District, Tianjin; China
- Coordinates: 39.1500°N 117.2016°E
- Operator: Tianjin Metro Co. Ltd.
- Line: Line 3

Construction
- Structure type: Underground

History
- Opened: 1 October 2012

Services
Preceding station	Tianjin Metro	Following station
Tianjinzhan towards Nanzhan	Line 3	Zhongshanlu towards Xiaodian
Location

Jinshiqiao Station (Chinese: 金狮桥站) is a station of Line 3 of the Tianjin Metro. It started operations on 1 October 2012.
