= Tianshili station =

Metro station in Tianjin, China

Tianshili 天士力
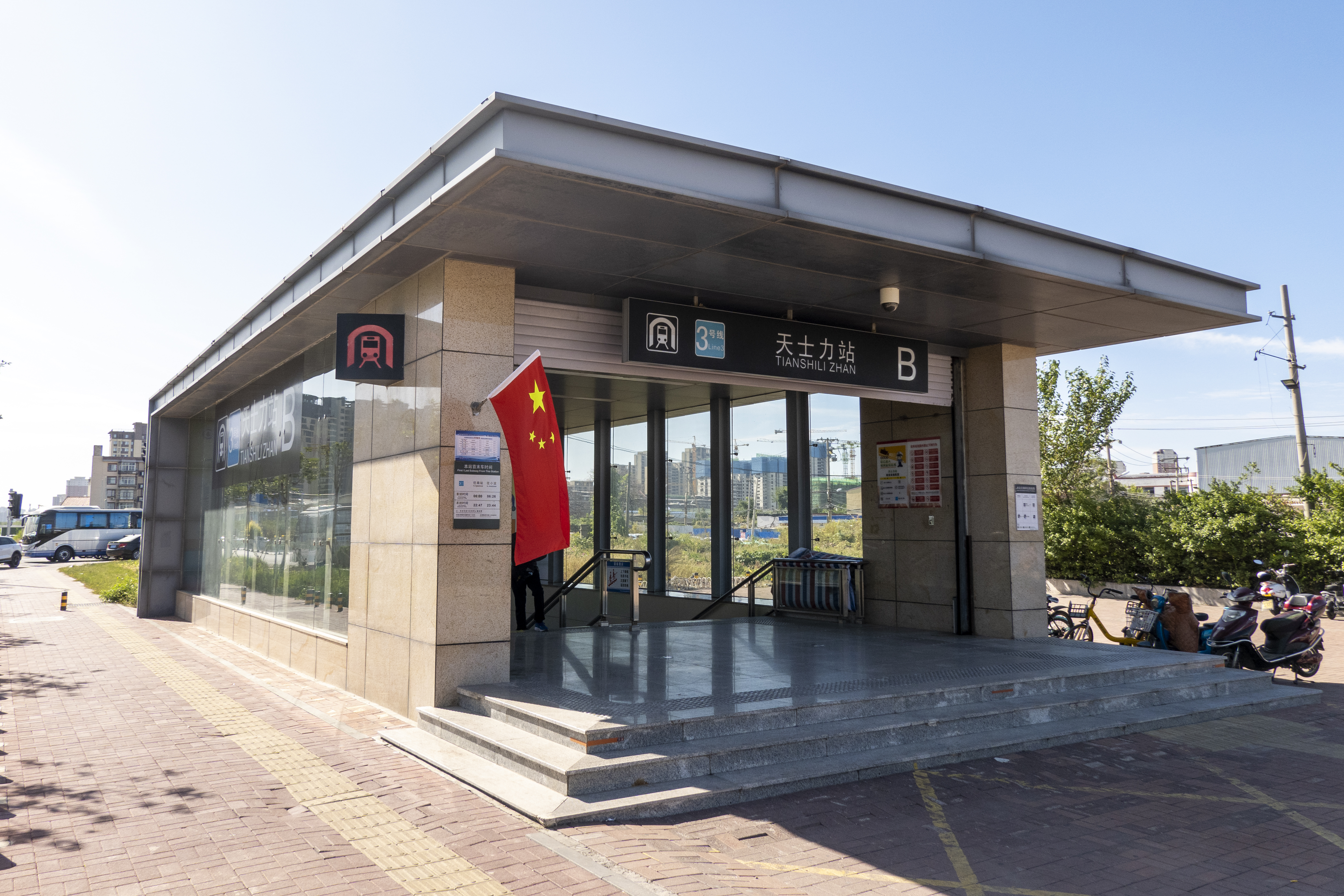

General information
- Other names: Tasly
- Location: Beichen District, Tianjin; China
- Operator: Tianjin Metro Co. Ltd.
- Line: Line 3

Construction
- Structure type: Underground

History
- Opened: 1 October 2012

Services
Preceding station	Tianjin Metro	Following station
Yixingfu towards Nanzhan	Line 3	Huabeijituan towards Xiaodian
Location

Tianshili Station (Chinese: 天士力站; pinyin: Tiānshìlì zhàn) is a station of the line 3 of the Tianjin Metro. It started operations on 1 October 2012.
