= Fengchanhe station =

Metro station in Tianjin, China

Fengchanhe 丰产河
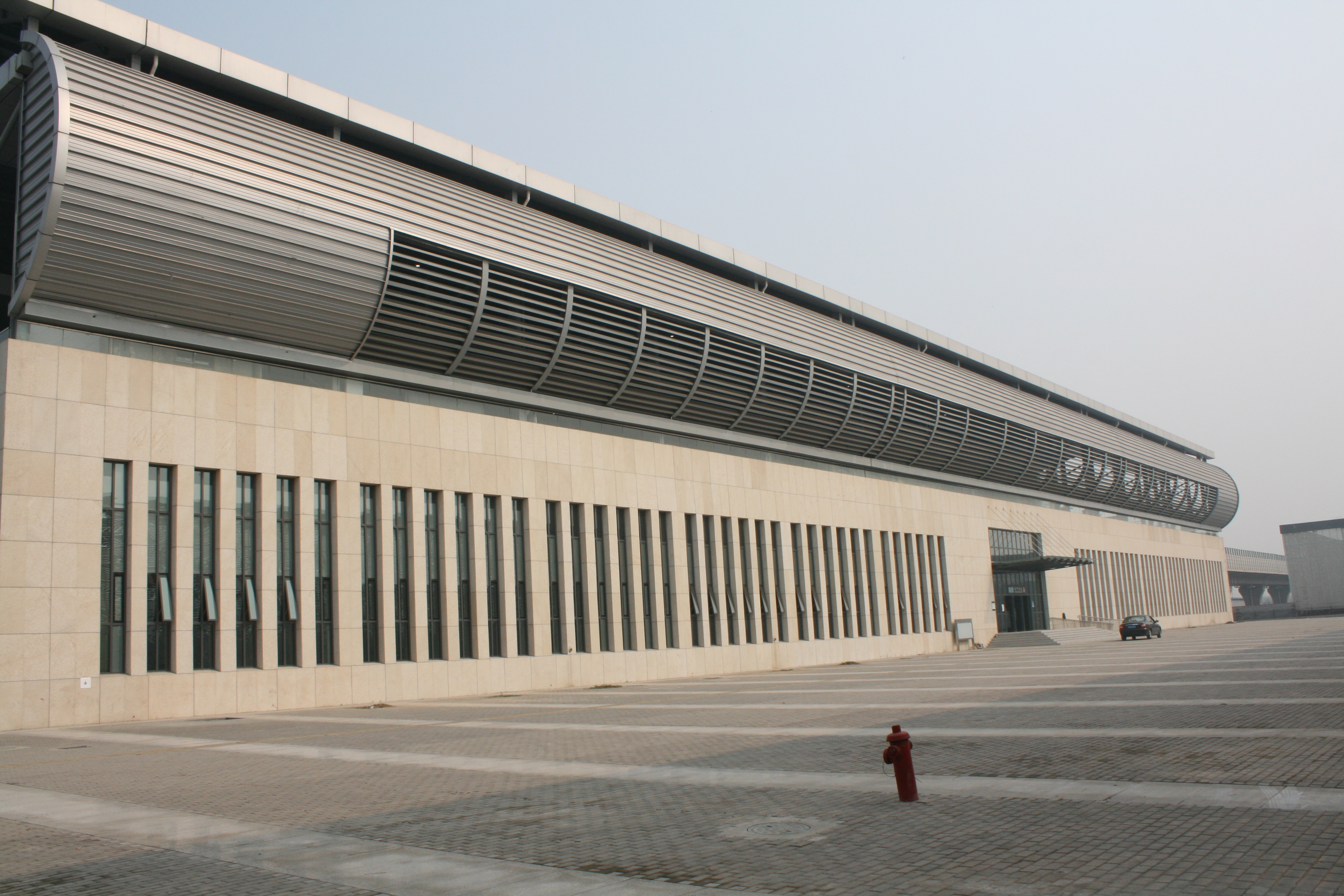

General information
- Other names: Fengchan River
- Location: Beichen District, Tianjin; China
- Coordinates: 39.2370°N 117.2298°E
- Operator: Tianjin Metro Co. Ltd.
- Line: Line 3

Construction
- Structure type: Elevated

History
- Opened: 1 October 2012

Services
| Preceding station | Tianjin Metro | Following station |
|---|---|---|
| Huabeijituan towards Nanzhan | Line 3 | Xiaodian Terminus |
Location

Fengchanhe Station (Chinese: 丰产河站), literally Fengchan River Station in English, is a station of Line 3 of the Tianjin Metro. It started operations on 1 October 2012.
