= Yangwuzhuang station =

Metro station in Tianjin, China

Coordinates: 39.0671°N 117.0632°E

Yangwuzhuang 杨伍庄
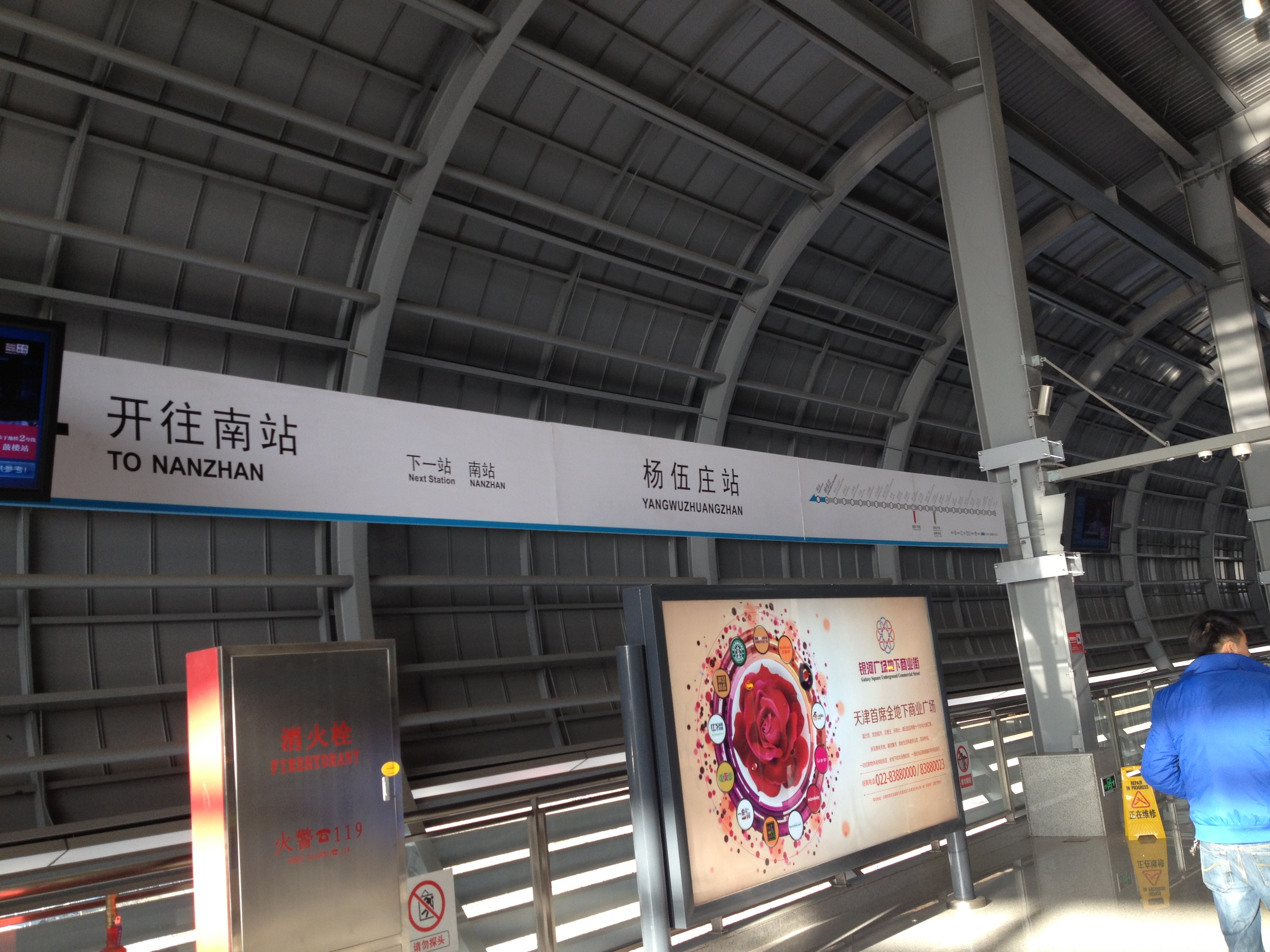

General information
- Location: Xiqing District, Tianjin; China
- Operated by: Tianjin Metro Co. Ltd.
- Line(s): Line 3

Construction
- Structure type: Elevated

History
- Opened: 28 December 2013

Services
Preceding station	Tianjin Metro	Following station
Nanzhan Terminus	Line 3	Xuefugongyequ towards Xiaodian

Yangwuzhuang Station (Chinese: 杨伍庄站) is a station of Line 3 of the Tianjin Metro in China. It started operations on 28 December 2013.
