= Line 3 (Tianjin Metro) =

Metro line in Tianjin, China

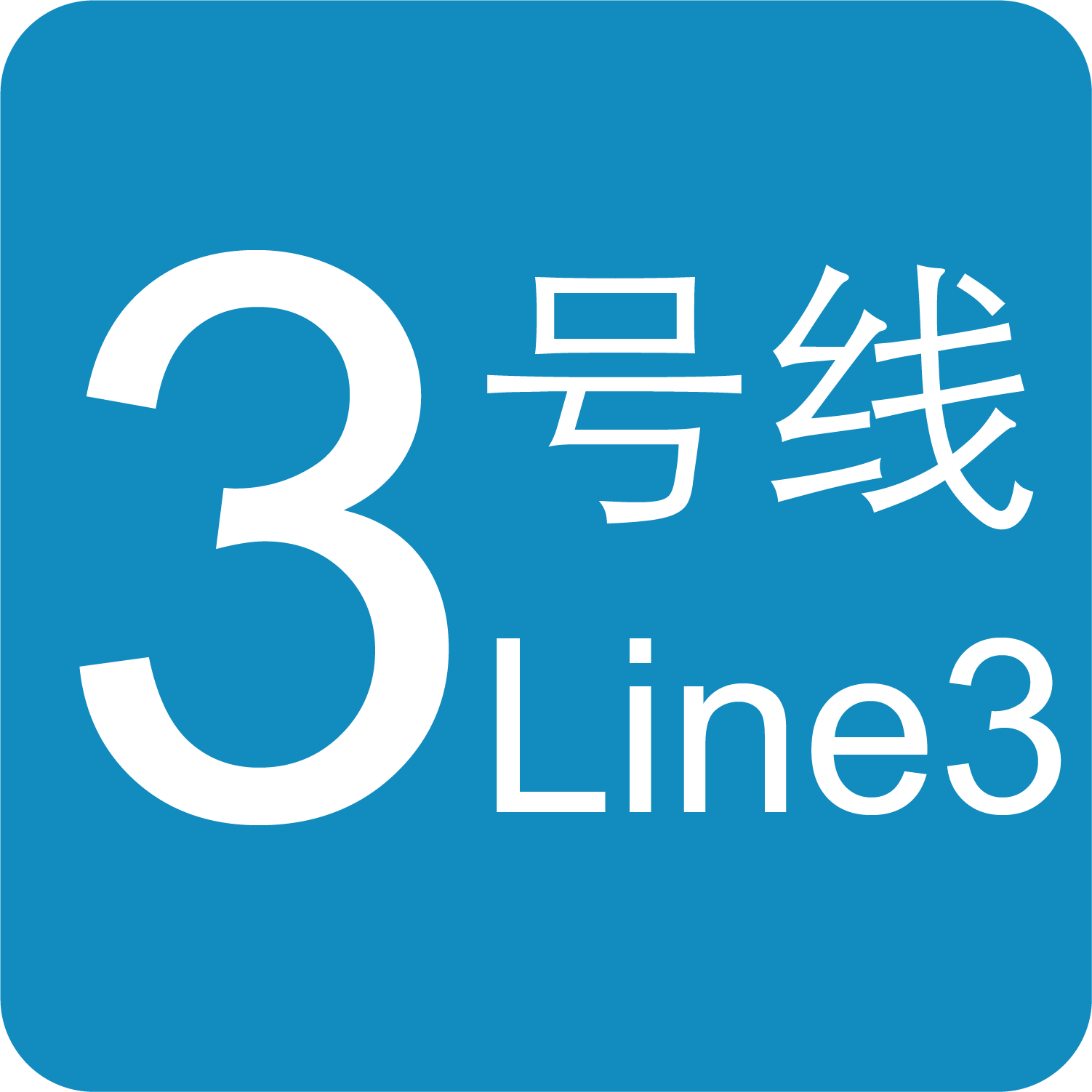

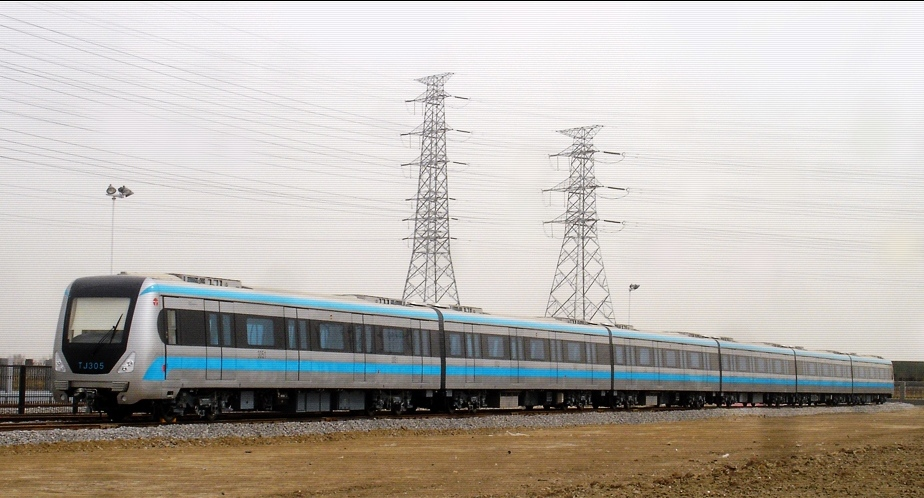
- Line 3 train

Overview
- Status: Operational
- Owner: Tianjin City Infrastructure Construction and Investment Group Ltd.
- Locale: Tianjin, China
- Termini: Xiaodian; Nanzhan
- Stations: 26

Service
- Type: Rapid transit
- System: Tianjin Metro
- Services: 1
- Operator(s): Tianjin Line 3 Rail Transit Operation Co., Ltd.
- Rolling stock: CRRC Qingdao Sifang SFM10 6 car set

History
- Opened: 1 October 2012; 14 years ago

Technical
- Line length: 33.7 km (20.94 mi)
- Num of tracks: 2
- Character: Underground, At-grade, & Elevated
- Track gauge: 1,435 mm (4 ft 8 1/2 in)

Line 3 of the Tianjin Metro (Chinese: 天津地铁三号线; pinyin: Tiānjīn Dìtiě Sān Hào Xiàn) a rapid transit line running from north-east to south-west Tianjin. It was opened on 1 October 2012. The line is 33.7 km long and has 26 stations, of which 8 are elevated and the rest are underground.

== Opening timeline ==
| Segment | Commencement | Length | Station(s) | Name |
|---|---|---|---|---|
| Gaoxinqu — Xiaodian | 1 October 2012 | 29.655 km (18.43 mi) | 23 | (initial phase) |
| Nanzhan — Gaoxinqu | 28 December 2013 | 1.1 km (0.68 mi) | 3 | Southern extension |

== Stations (southwest to northeast) ==
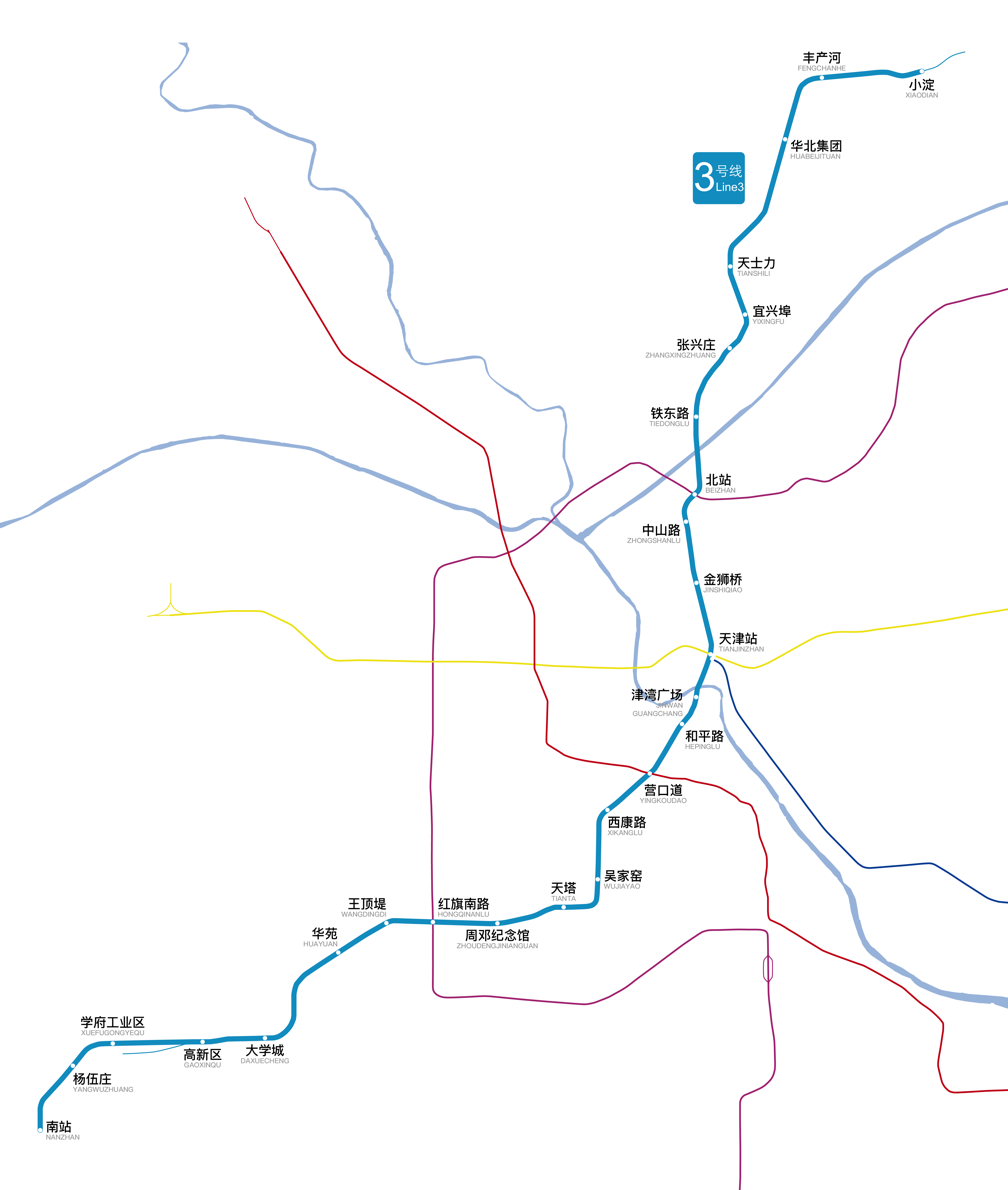
Line 3 drawn to scale.

OSI: Out-of-station interchange

| Station name | | Connections | Bus connections | Distance km | | Location |
| English | Chinese | Connections | Bus connections | Distance km | | Location |
|---|---|---|---|---|---|---|
| Nanzhan | 南站 | TIP | 312A线 312B线 358 587 589 674 707 707通勤早高峰区间线 758 国展定制3线 通勤707 | 0.00 | 0.00 | Xiqing |
| Yangwuzhuang | 杨伍庄 | | | 1.46 | 1.46 | Xiqing |
| Xuefugongyequ | 学府工业区 | | 620 624 638 667内环 667外环 862 | 0.92 | 2.38 | Xiqing |
| Gaoxinqu | 高新区 | | 189 190 191 192 313 620 667内环 667外环 754 | 1.74 | 4.12 | Xiqing |
| Daxuecheng | 大学城 | | 162 162区间 311 620区间 667内环 667外环 687 卓尔1号专线 | 1.18 | 5.30 | Xiqing |
| Huayuan | 华苑 | | 322 347 638 687 | 2.70 | 8.00 | Nankai / Xiqing |
| Wangdingdi | 王顶堤 | | 95 608 609 616 638 685 687 698 703 835 847 849 850 872 观光2 快速2 通勤616 通勤685 通勤872 通学8 | 0.79 | 8.79 | Nankai |
| Hongqinanlu | 红旗南路 | Tianjin Metro Line 6 | 50 52 95 608 609 616 638 643 685 687 698 703 711 829 831 835 847 849 850 857 871 872 902 903 观光2 快速2 通勤616 通勤685 通勤872 通学8 | 0.79 | 9.58 | Nankai |
| Zhoudengji'nianguan | 周邓纪念馆 | | 588 643 871 872 904 观光2 | 1.36 | 10.94 | Nankai |
| Tianta | 天塔 | Tianjin Metro Line 7 | 8 12 156 157 157大圈 157宽河区间 161 168 169 184 184区间 588 615 615快线 628 643 658 675 686 710 710区间 712 713 832 859 872 观光2 通勤832 | 1.27 | 12.21 | Hexi / Nankai |
| Wujiayao | 吴家窑 | Tianjin Metro Line 11 | 9 35 35区间 47 47区间 48 48区间 95 175 189 190 310 662 685 697 698 831 845 855 870 871 872 878 879 901 902 904 951 952 963 观光2 通勤9 通勤685 通勤872 | 1.01 | 13.22 | Hexi |
| Xikanglu | 西康路 | Tianjin Metro Line 8 | 35 35区间 858 862 908 | 1.45 | 14.67 | Heping |
| Yingkoudao | 营口道 | Tianjin Metro Line 1 | 3 45 50 503 600内环 600外环 631 632 641 643 657 659 669 673 800 840 842 847 851 865 867 870 901 906 954 金街观光车 津游1线 通勤842 专线678 | 1.09 | 15.76 | Heping |
| Hepinglu | 和平路 | (OSI) | 1 20 28 37 96 96区间 185 186 189 642 660 688 760 808 828 837 865 868 公墓定制专线3 公墓定制专线9 观光1 津游1线 小精卫游览线 | 1.12 | 16.88 | Heping |
| Jinwan'guangchang | 津湾广场 | | 津游1线 | 1.61 | 18.49 | Heping |
| Tianjinzhan | 天津站 | TJP | 5 8 8区间 13 24 27 28 35 35区间 50 96 96区间 97 150大圈 156 158 176 181 182 185 186 186快线 187 188 188盘山旅游专线 195 196 198 199 461 462航母旅游专线 462专线 468 528 570快线 570专线 574 607 621 634 635 638 639东线 639西线 645 645区间 651 660 663 666 672 676 701 749 760 802 806 808 813 824 827 828 832 836 868 905 951 953 961 观光3 国展定制2线 环球影城直通车 机场穿梭车 机场大巴天津站 机场天津站线 京津城际商务班车 跨城穿梭车 通勤570 通勤832 小187路低速线 | 0.85 | 19.34 | Hedong |
| Jinshiqiao | 金狮桥 | | 22 27 146 147 172 600内环 633 653 675 701 856 907 908 916 观光2 | 1.41 | 20.75 | Hebei |
| Zhongshanlu | 中山路 | | 1 1区间 12 18 609 610 619 641 646 670 671 702 803 813 818 869 901 903 | 1.19 | 21.94 | Hebei |
| Beizhan | 北站 | TBP | 1 1区间 27 469 609 619 622 641 646 670 671 702 813 818 869 901 903 908 | 0.66 | 22.60 | Hebei |
| Tiedonglu | 铁东路 | | 47 47区间 48 48区间 181 602 619 641 670 671 749 813 863 901 908 910 910区间 911 912 通勤911 通勤912 | 1.48 | 24.08 | Hebei |
| Zhangxingzhuang | 张兴庄 | Tianjin Metro Line 5 | 27 675 852 | 1.50 | 25.58 | Beichen |
| Yixingfu | 宜兴埠 | | 27 675 | 0.74 | 26.32 | Beichen |
| Tianshili | 天士力 | | 148 149 150 150大圈 160 181 182 196 670 671 740 749 811 | 0.92 | 27.24 | Beichen |
| Huabeijituan | 华北集团 | | 148 149 150 150大圈 150区间 160 160快线 160区间 181 182 196 197 198 670 671 740 764 765 宝坻天津线 小187低速线 | 2.76 | 30.00 | Beichen |
| Fengchanhe | 丰产河 | | 148 149 150 150大圈 150区间 160 160快线 160区间 181 182 196 670 671 | 1.51 | 31.51 | Beichen |
| Xiaodian | 小淀 | | 765 | 1.89 | 33.40 | Beichen |
