= Line 11 (Tianjin Metro) =

Metro line in Tianjin, China

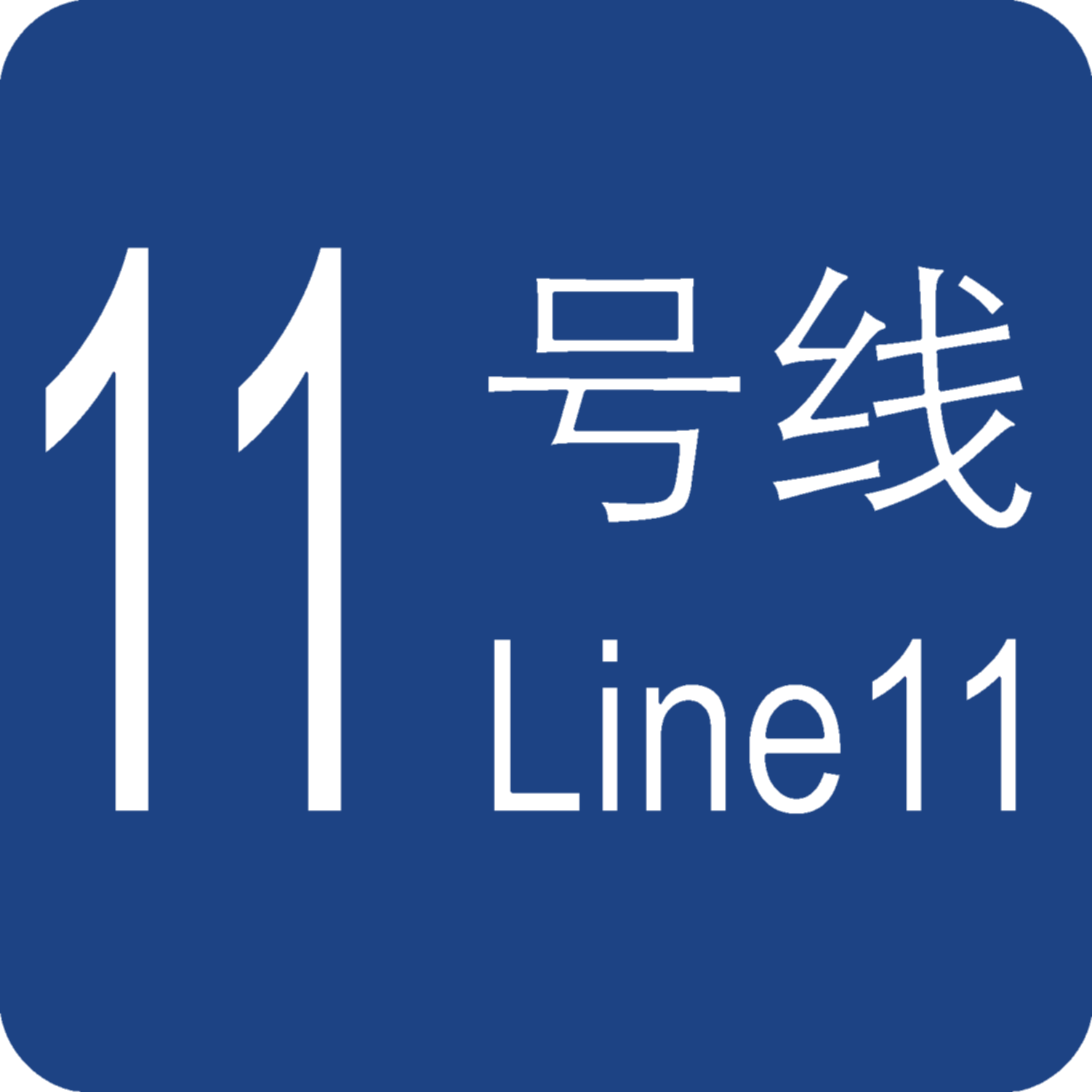

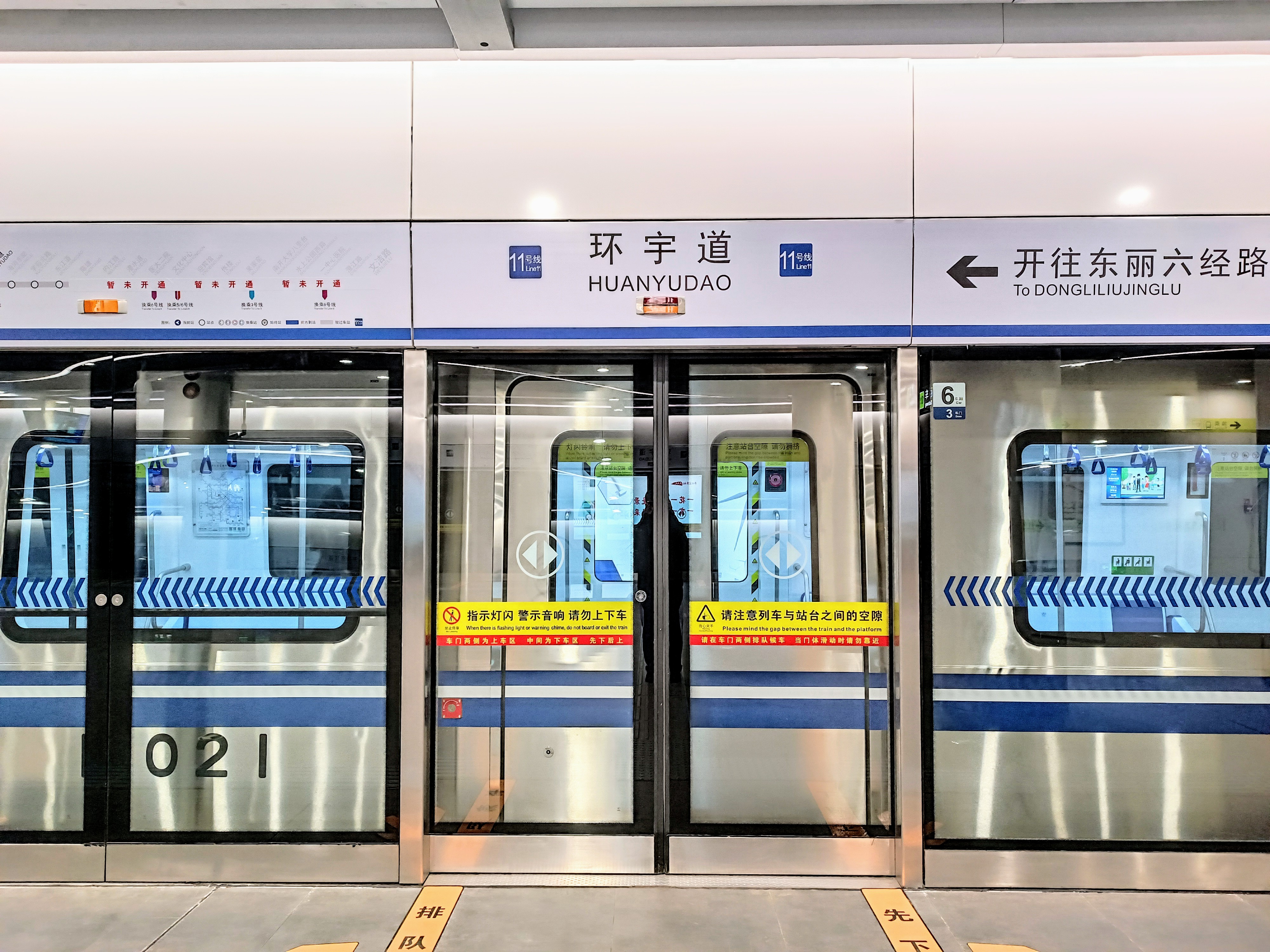
- Huanyudao station

Overview
- Status: Operational
- Locale: Tianjin, China
- Termini: Shuishanggongyuanxilu; Dongliliujinglu
- Stations: 21 (in operation); 24 (when complete)

Service
- Type: Rapid transit
- System: Tianjin Metro
- Operator: CCCC consortium

History
- Opened: 28 December 2023; 2 years ago

Technical
- Line length: 23.8 km (14.8 mi) (Phase 1, excluding 3-station extension)
- Track gauge: 1,435 mm (4 ft 8 1/2 in)
- Operating speed: 80 km/h (50 mph)
- Highest elevation: DC 1500 V with overhead catenary

Line 11 of Tianjin Metro (Chinese: 天津地铁11号线; pinyin: Tiānjīn Dìtiě Shí Yī Hào Xiàn) is a metro line in Tianjin. The east section of Phase 1 (Dongjiangdao–Dongliliujinglu) started operation on 28 December 2023.

== Opening timeline ==
| Segment | Commencement | Length | Station(s) | Name |
|---|---|---|---|---|
| Dongjiangdao — Dongliliujinglu | 28 December 2023 | 13.68 km (8.50 mi) | 11 | East section of Phase 1 |
| Shuishanggongyuanxilu — Dongjiangdao | 28 December 2024 | 10.12 km (6.29 mi) | 10 | West section of Phase 1 |

== Stations ==
- OSI: out-of-system interchange

| Station name | | Connections | Distance km | Location |
| English | Chinese | Connections | Distance km | Location |
|---|---|---|---|---|
| Wenjielu | 文洁路 | | | Xiqing |
| Chengjianglu | 澄江路 | | | Nankai |
| Yizhongxinyiyuan | 一中心医院 | Tianjin Metro Line 6 | | Nankai |
| Shuishanggongyuanxilu | 水上公园西路 | | | Nankai |
| Nankaidaxuebalitai | 南开大学八里台 | Tianjin Metro Line 7 | | Nankai |
| Wujiayao | 吴家窑 | Tianjin Metro Line 3 | | Hexi |
| Tonglou | 佟楼 | | | Hexi |
| Yingbinguan | 迎宾馆 | | | Hexi |
| Wenhuazhongxin | 文化中心 | Tianjin Metro Line 5 Tianjin Metro Line 6 | | Hexi |
| Yidaeryuan | 医大二院 | Tianjin Metro Line 6 | | Hexi |
| Lishuidao | 澧水道 | Tianjin Metro Line 8 | | Hexi |
| Neijianglu | 内江路 | | | Hexi |
| Chentang | 陈塘 | | | Hexi |
| Dongjiangdao | 东江道 | (OSI via Huashanli) | | Hexi |
| Xueyuanbeilu | 学苑北路 | | | Hexi |
| Haihedonglu | 海河东路 | | | Dongli |
| Huanyudao | 环宇道 | Tianjin Metro Line 10 | | Dongli |
| Xueliannanlu | 雪莲南路 | | | Dongli / Hedong |
| Zhaoyuanlu | 招远路 | | | Dongli |
| Dongliwentizhongxin | 东丽文体中心 | | | Dongli |
| Xunhailu | 驯海路 | | | Dongli |
| Dongliyijinglu | 东丽一经路 | | | Dongli |
| Donglisanjinglu | 东丽三经路 | | | Dongli |
| Dongliliujinglu | 东丽六经路 | | | Dongli |
