= Line 4 (Tianjin Metro) =

Metro line in Tianjin, China

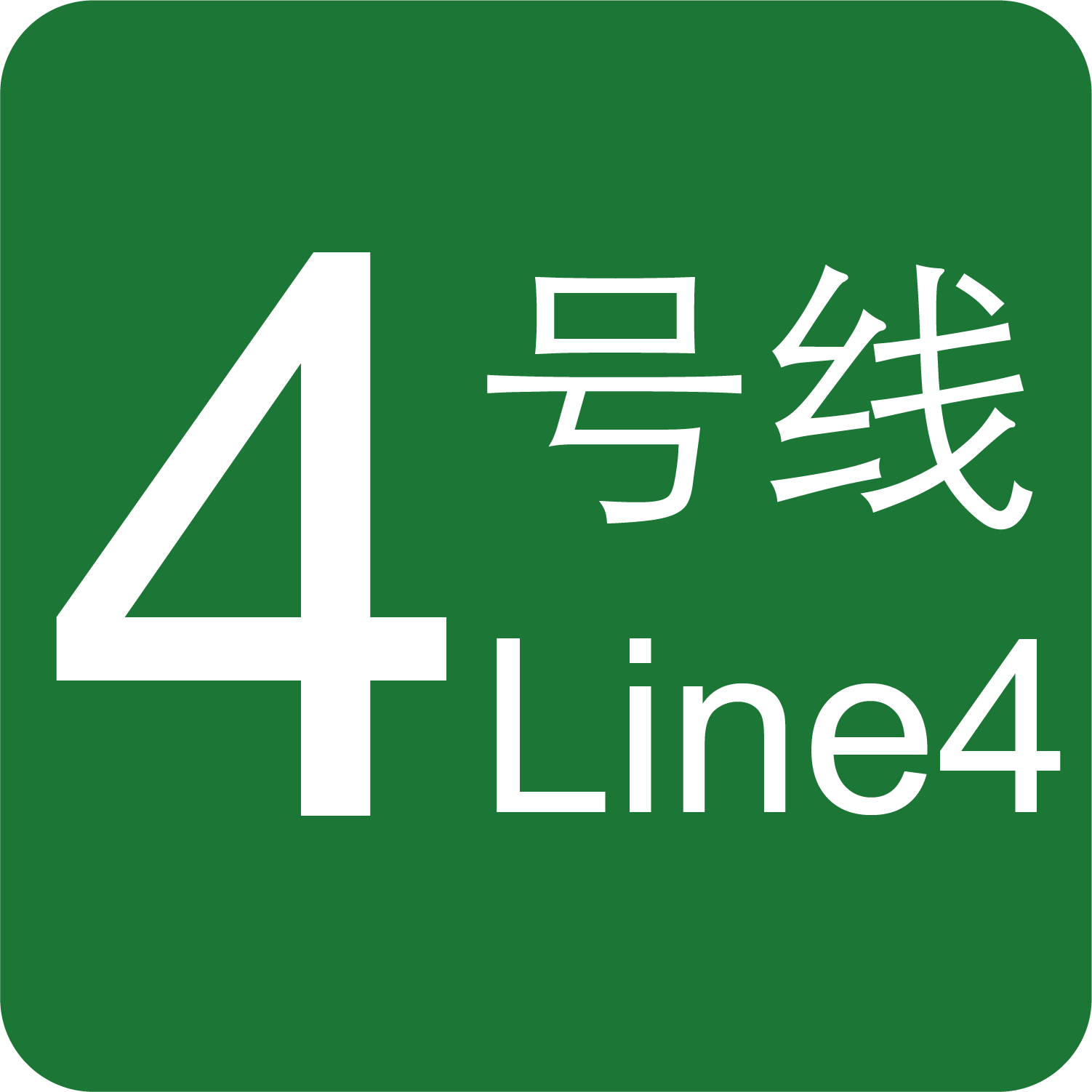

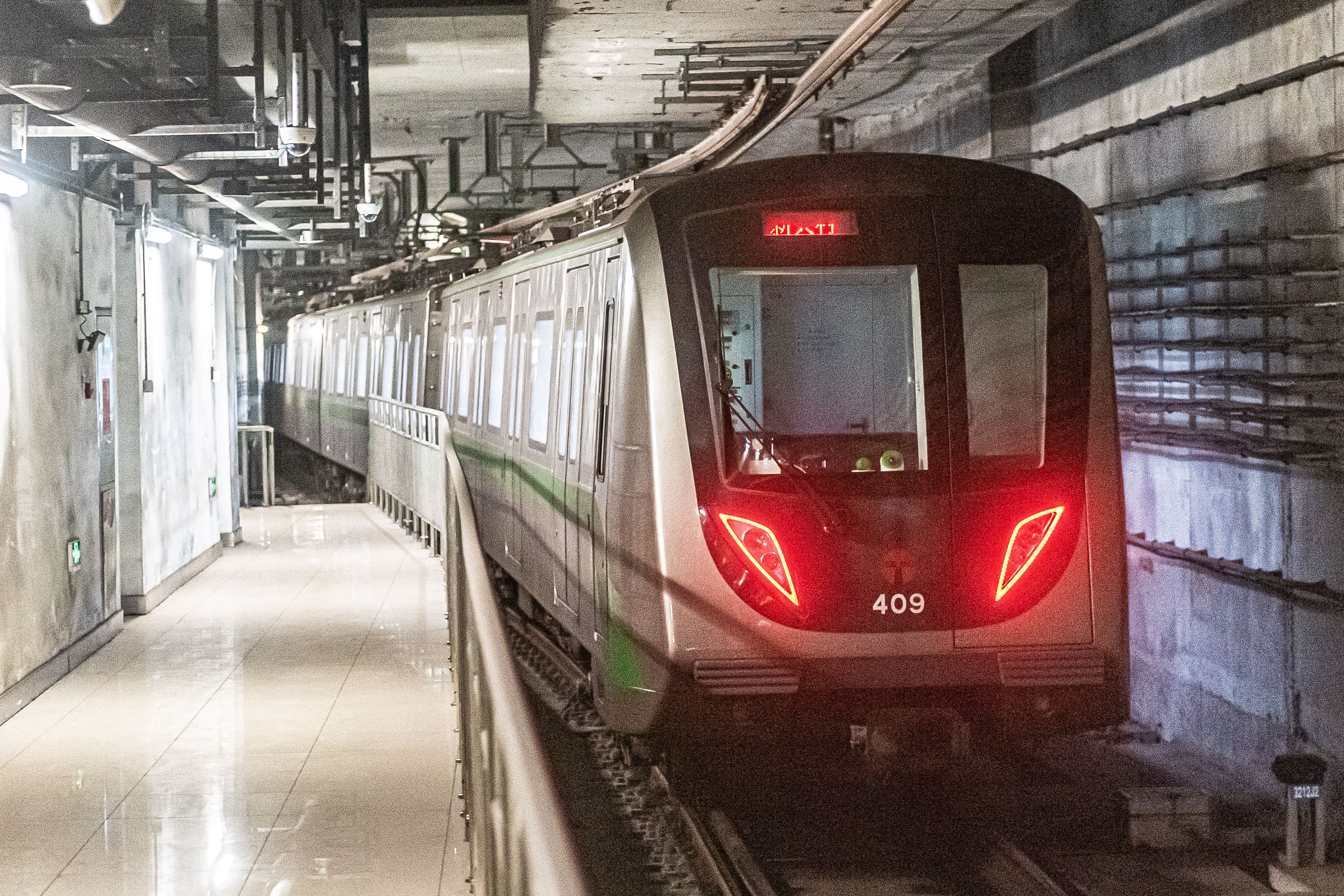
- Line 4 train leaving Xinxingcun station

Overview
- Status: Operational
- Locale: Tianjin, China
- Termini: Xiaojie; Xinxingcun
- Stations: 14 (Southern section); 16 (Northern section)

Service
- Type: Rapid transit
- System: Tianjin Metro
- Operator(s): CREC (Tianjin) Rail Transport Investment & Construction Co., Ltd.

History
- Opened: 28 December 2021; 4 years ago (Southern section)

Technical
- Line length: 19.4 km (12.1 mi) (Southern section); 19.85 km (12.33 mi) (Northern section)
- Character: Underground
- Track gauge: 1,435 mm (4 ft 8 1/2 in)

Line 4 of Tianjin Metro (Chinese: 天津地铁4号线; pinyin: Tiānjīn Dìtiě Sì Hào Xiàn) is a metro line in Tianjin. The south section (Dongnanjiao–Xinxingcun) started operation on 28 December 2021. The north section (Xiaojie–Xizhan) started operation on 8 July 2025.

== Opening timeline ==
Segment	Commencement	Length	Station(s)	Name
Dongnanjiao — Xinxingcun	28 December 2021	19.41 km (12.06 mi)	14	South section
Xiaojie — Xizhan	8 July 2025	19.85 km (12.33 mi)	16	North section
Xizhan — Dongnanjiao	TBA		2	Middle section

== Stations (northwest to southeast) ==
- OSI: Out-of-station interchange

Station name		Connections	Bus Connections	Distance km	Location
English	Chinese	Connections	Bus Connections	Distance km	Location
Xiaojie	小街				Beichen
Langyuan	郎园				Beichen
Chailou	柴楼				Beichen
Shuangjie	双街				Beichen
Xizhaozhuang	西赵庄				Beichen
Yanjidao	延吉道				Beichen
Beicang	北仓				Beichen
Guoyuannandao	果园南道				Beichen
Nancang	南仓				Beichen
Tianmu	天穆				Beichen
Liutan	柳滩				Beichen
Baimiao	白庙				Hebei
Beiyangqiao	北洋桥				Hebei
Xigugongyuan	西沽公园				Hongqiao
Tongchengshangwuquxiyuzhuang	同城商务区西于庄				Hongqiao
Xizhan	西站	TXP			Hongqiao
Hebeidajie	河北大街				Hongqiao
Dongbeijiao	东北角				Hongqiao
Dongnanjiao	东南角	Tianjin Metro Line 2	1 1区间 5 24 37 156 158 619 634 671 688 693 801 804 836 837 观光3		Nankai
Jinjie	金街		1 1区间 8 619 635 638 639西线 640 642 645 645区间 651 671 672 676 693 801 804快线 806 824 832 841 870 905 961 观光1		Heping
Hepinglu	和平路	(OSI)			Heping
Xuzhoudao	徐州道	(OSI via Xiaobailou)			Hedong / Heping
Liuweilu	六纬路		92 642 643 840		Hedong
Chenglindao	成林道	Tianjin Metro Line 5	30 30区间 42 47 47西半环区间 48 48区间 353 516市区线 608 639东线 640 656 665 666 681 827 836 847 856 866 905 912 916 963 通勤665 通学1		Hedong
Taichanglu	泰昌路		28 30 30区间 42 47 47区间 48 48区间 176 327 368 369 511 666 706 862 912 962 通勤651 通勤912		Hedong
Wandonglu	万东路		42 327 368 369 511 623 651 666 706 862 962 通勤651 专线678		Hedong
Shaliunanlu	沙柳南路	Tianjin Metro Line 10	42 327 341 368 371 511 666 819 916 专线678		Dongli
Dengzhounanlu	登州南路		42 666		Dongli
Yuejinbeilu	跃进北路		371 511 666 专线678		Dongli
Hangshuanglu	航双路		371 511 666		Dongli
Minhangdaxue	民航大学		371 666 690西线		Dongli
Xinxingcun	新兴村				Dongli
