= Porcelain House =

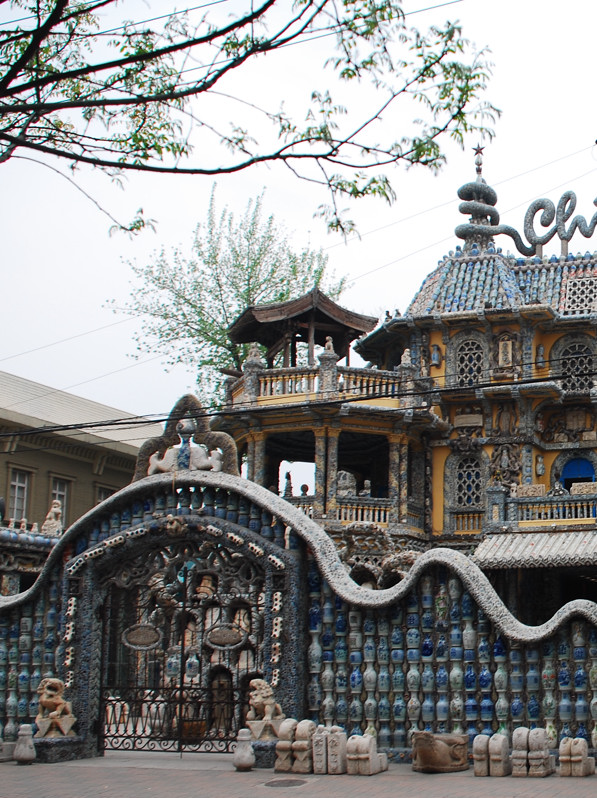
Porcelain House

Porcelain House (Chinese: 瓷房子; pinyin: Cífángzi), also known as China house, is a contemporary museum of pottery and antiques in Tianjin, China.

== Characteristics ==
The museum is located in a historical colonial building, which has been radically re-decorated by its present owner, Zhang Lianzhi, using copious amounts of broken porcelain. The house also contains antique furniture. The site is a tourist attraction.

== See also ==
- Trencadís
- Park Güell
