= Xiaodian station =

Metro station in Tianjin, China

Coordinates: 39.2392°N 117.2574°E

Xiaodian 小淀
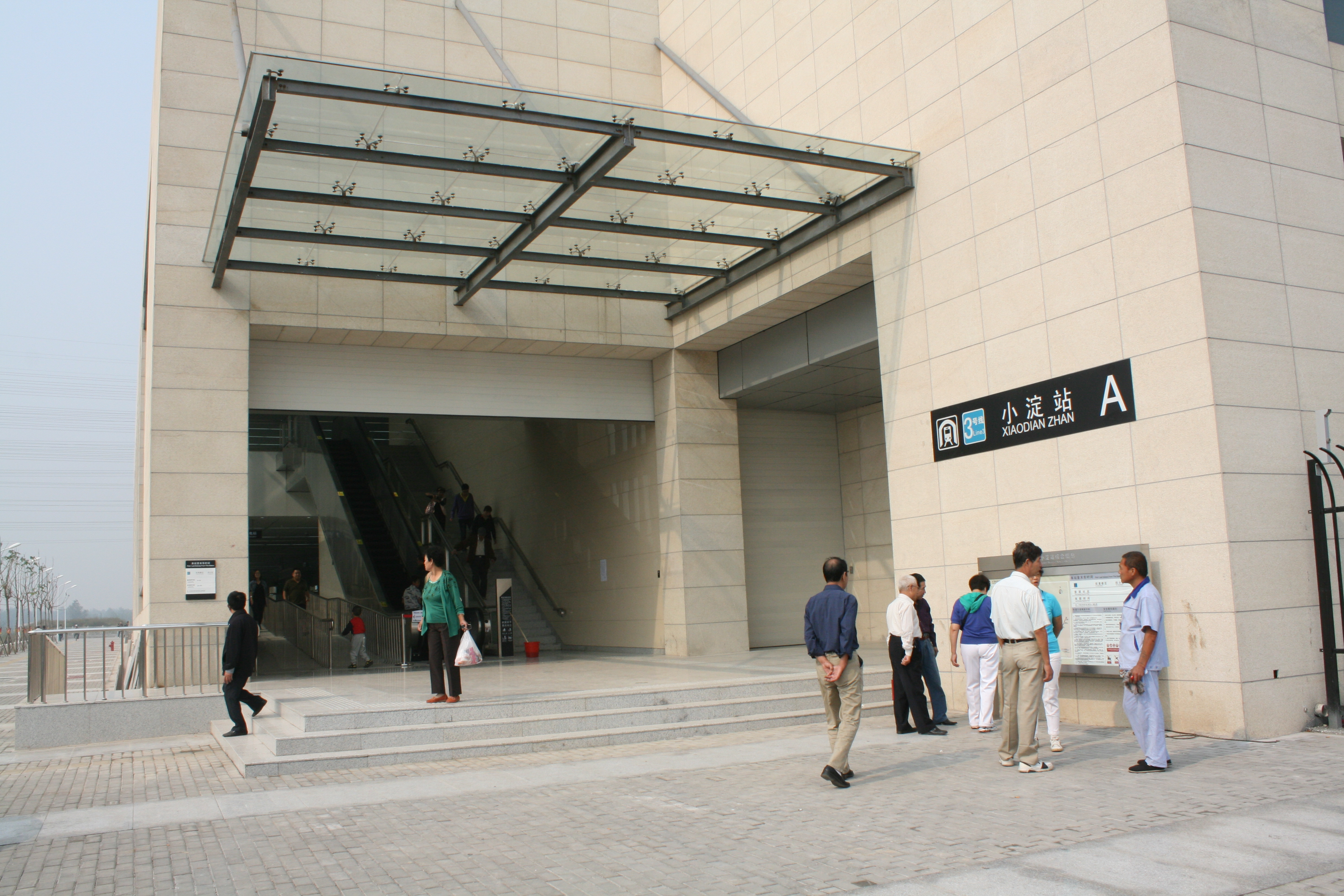

General information
- Location: Beichen District, Tianjin; China
- Operator: Tianjin Metro Co. Ltd.
- Line: Line 3

Construction
- Structure type: Elevated

History
- Opened: 1 October 2012

Services
Preceding station	Tianjin Metro	Following station
Fengchanhe towards Nanzhan	Line 3	Terminus
Location

Xiaodian Station (Chinese: 小淀站) is a station of Line 3 of the Tianjin Metro. It started operations on 1 October 2012.
