= Nanzhan station =

Metro station in Tianjin, China

Nanzhan 南站
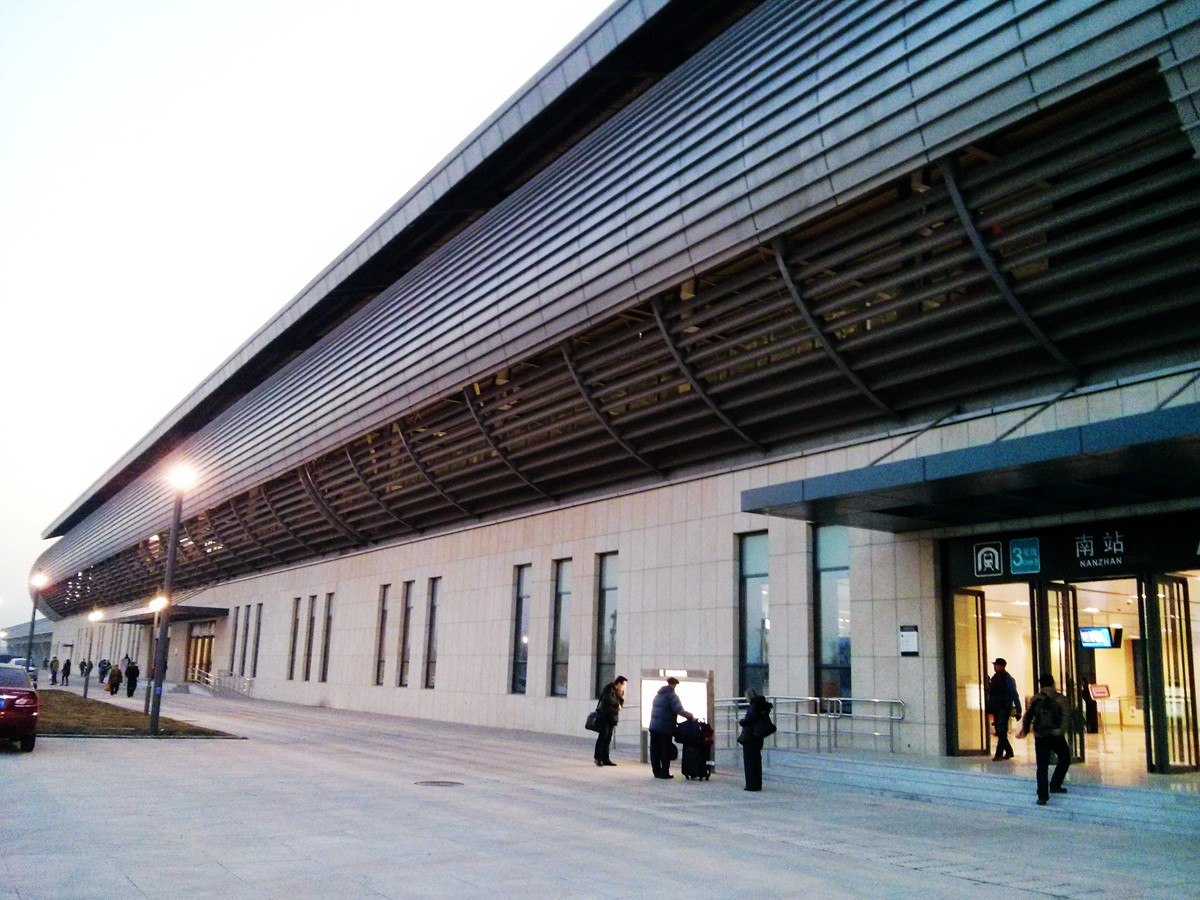

General information
- Other names: Tianjin South Railway Station
- Location: Xiqing District, Tianjin; China
- Operated by: Tianjin Metro Co. Ltd.
- Line: Line 3
- Connections: Tianjin South railway station

Construction
- Structure type: Elevated

History
- Opened: 28 December 2013

Services
Preceding station	Tianjin Metro	Following station
Terminus	Line 3	Yangwuzhuang towards Xiaodian
Location

Nanzhan Station (Chinese: 南站站; lit. '(Tianjin) South (Railway) Station Station') is a station of Line 3 of the Tianjin Metro in China. It started operations on 28 December 2013.
