= Shanghang Road Subdistrict =

Shanghang Road Subdistrict 上杭路街道
- Subdistrict
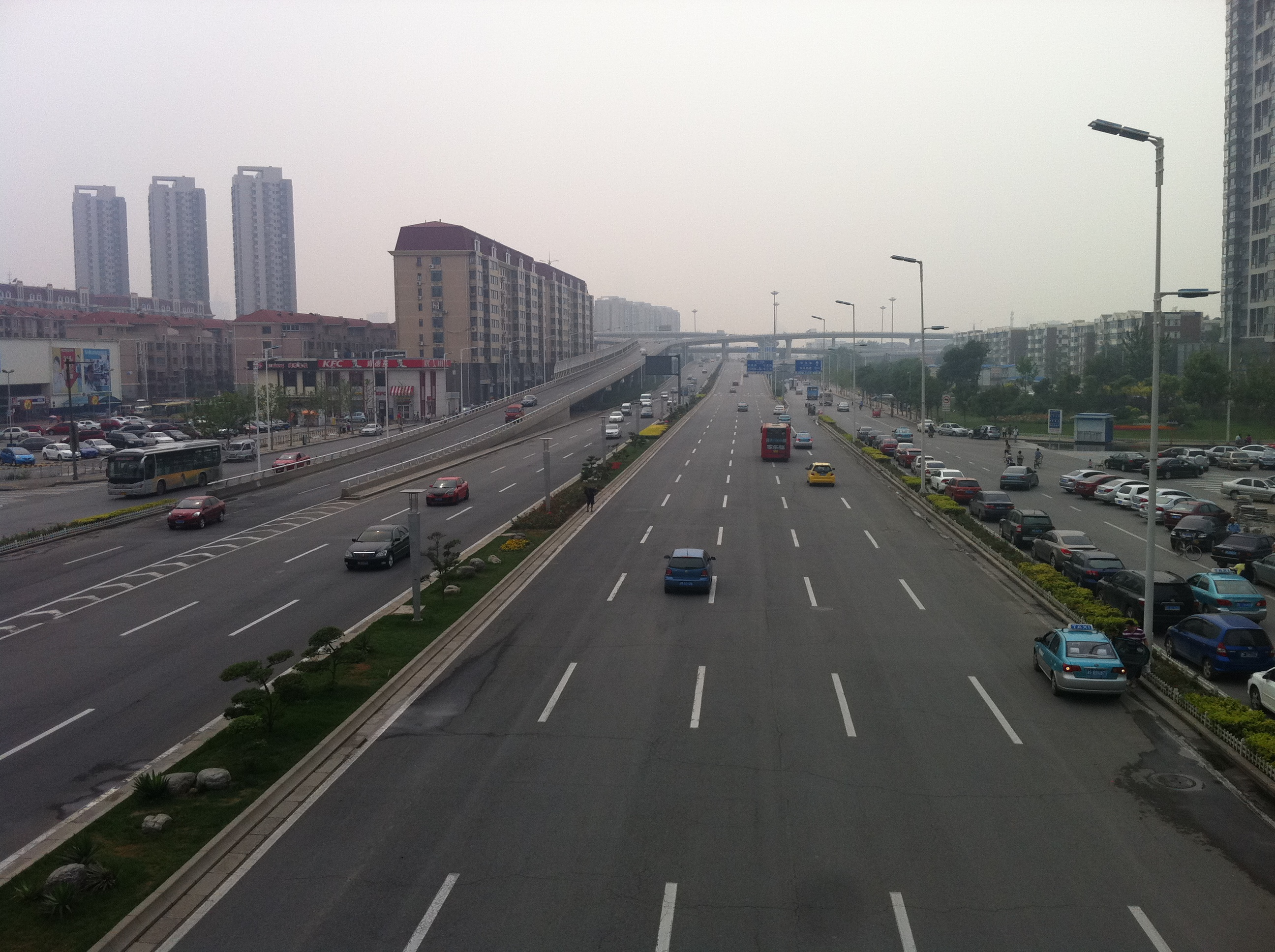
- Dongzong Expressway on the center of the subdistrict, 2016

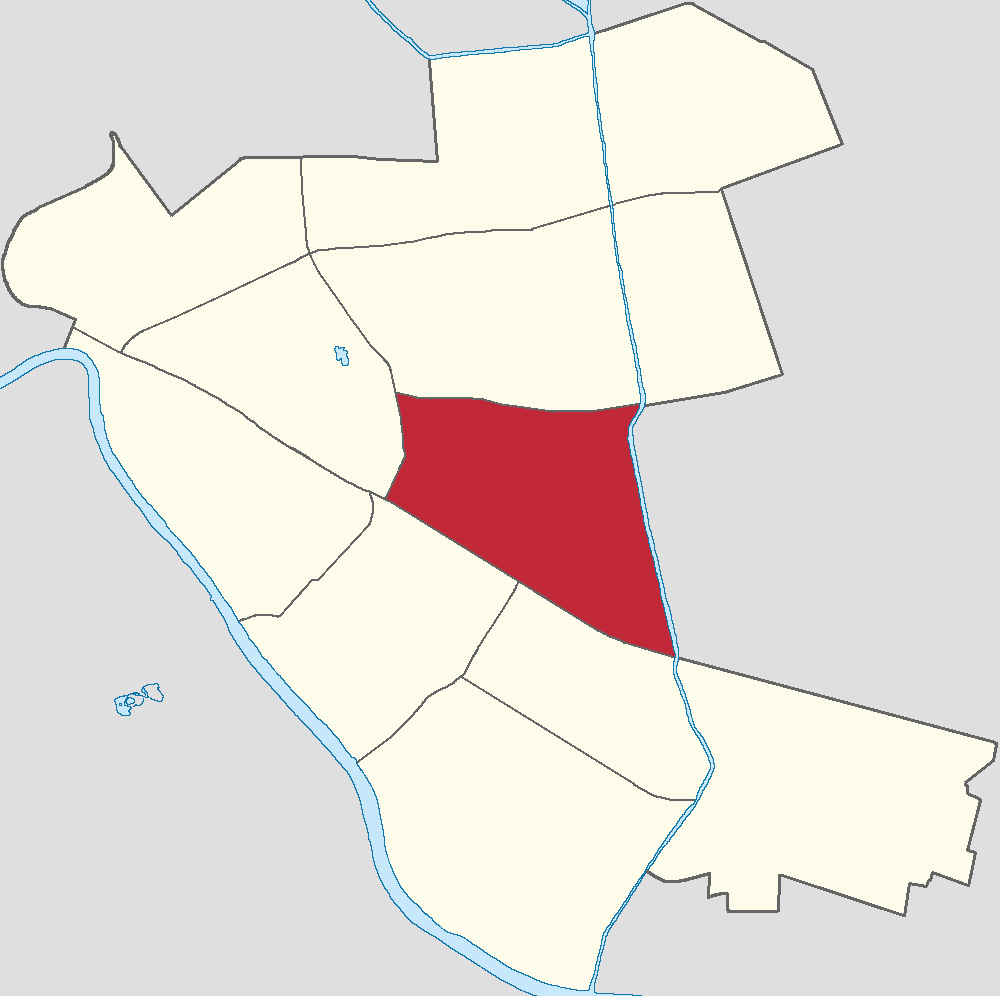
- Location of Shanghang Street Subdistrict in Hedong District

- Location within Tianjin Location within China
- Coordinates: 39°07′26″N 117°15′36″E
- Country: China
- Municipality: Tianjin
- District: Hedong
- Village-level Divisions: 15 communities

Area
  - Total: 3.81 km^{2} (1.47 sq mi)
- Elevation: 6 m (20 ft)

Population (2010)
  - Total: 66,164
  - Density: 17,400/km^{2} (45,000/sq mi)
- Time zone: UTC+8 (China Standard)
- Postal code: 300161
- Area code: 022

Shanghang Road Subdistrict (Chinese: 上杭路街道; pinyin: Shànghánglù Jiēdào) is a subdistrict located on the central part of Hedong District, Tianjin. it shares border with Xiangyanglou Subdistrict in the north, Wanxin Subdistrict in the east, Zhongshanmen and Dazhigu Subdistricts in the southwest, and Tangjiakou Subdistrict in the northwest. It was home to 66,164 residents as of 2010.

Its name is taken from Shanghang Street that runs through the subdistrict.

== History ==
Timeline of Shanghang Road Subdistrict
Year	Status	Under
1953 - 1958		Tianjin
1958 - 1962		Hedong District, Tianjin
1962 - 1981	Administered by Wanxincun People's Commune	Dongli District, Tianjin
1981 - 1985	Wanxinzhuang (万新庄) Subdistrict	Dongli District, Tianjin
1985 - 1996	Wanxinzhuang (万辛庄) Subdistrict	Hedong District, Tianjin
1996–present	Shanghang Street Subdistrict	Hedong District, Tianjin

== Administrative divisions ==
As of the time in writing, Shanghang Road Subdistrict consisted of 15 communities. They are organized in the following list:

Subdivision names	Name transliterations
程林里	Chenglinli
滨河里	Binheli
凤麟里	Fenglinli
万平里	Wanpingli
泰昌西里	Taichang Xili
万和里	Wanheli
来安里	Lai'anli
金湾花园	Jinwan Huayuan
懿德园	Yideyuan
陆典庭园	Ludian Tingyuan
大洋嘉园	Dayang Jiayuan
芳水河畔	Fangshui Hepan
万达广场	Wanda Guangchang
静墅里	Jingshuli
红星国际广场	Hongxing Guoji Guangchang
