= Dongxin Subdistrict, Tianjin =

Dongxin Subdistrict 东新街道
- Subdistrict
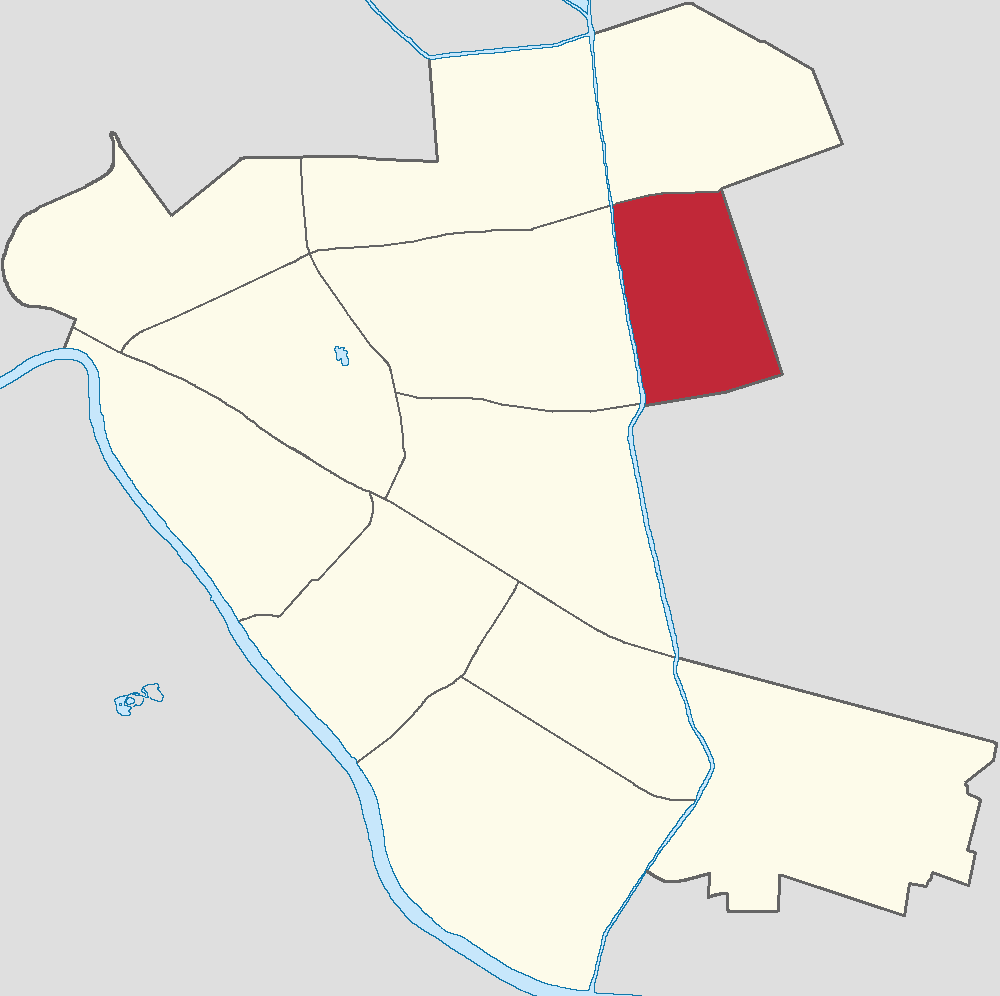
- Location within Hedong District

- Location within Tianjin Location within China
- Coordinates: 39°08′29″N 117°16′12″E
- Country: China
- Municipality: Tianjin
- District: Hedong
- Village-level Divisions: 15 communities

Area
  - Total: 2.16 km^{2} (0.83 sq mi)
- Elevation: 6 m (20 ft)

Population (2010)
  - Total: 90,809
  - Density: 42,000/km^{2} (109,000/sq mi)
- Time zone: UTC+8 (China Standard)
- Postal code: 300171
- Area code: 022

Dongxin Subdistrict (simplified Chinese: 东新街道; traditional Chinese: 東新街道; pinyin: Dōngxīn Jiēdào) is a subdistrict situated inside of Hedong District, Tianjin. it is located at the south of Lushan Street Subdistrict, west and north of Wanxin Subdistrict,, east of Xiangyanglou Subdistrict. Its population was 90,809 according to the 2020 Chinese Census.

The subdistrict's name literally means "Eastern New".

== Administrative divisions ==
As of the year 2021, Dongxin Subdistrict oversaw these following 15 communities:

Subdivision names	Name transliterations
松风西里	Songfeng Xili
沧浪里	Canglangli
环秀东里	Huanxiu Dongli
曲溪西里	Quxi Xili
曲溪中里	Quxi Zhongli
凤岐里	Fengqili
凤岐东里	Fengqi Dongli
天泉里	Tianquanli
远翠西里	Yuancui Xili
远翠中里	Yuancui Zhongli
远翠东里	Yuancui Dongli
冠云中里	Guanyun Zhongli
沙柳北路	Shaliu Beilu
倚虹西里	Yihong Xili
松风东里	Songfeng Dongli
