= Erhaoqiao Subdistrict =

Erhaoqiao Subdistrict 二号桥街道
- Subdistrict
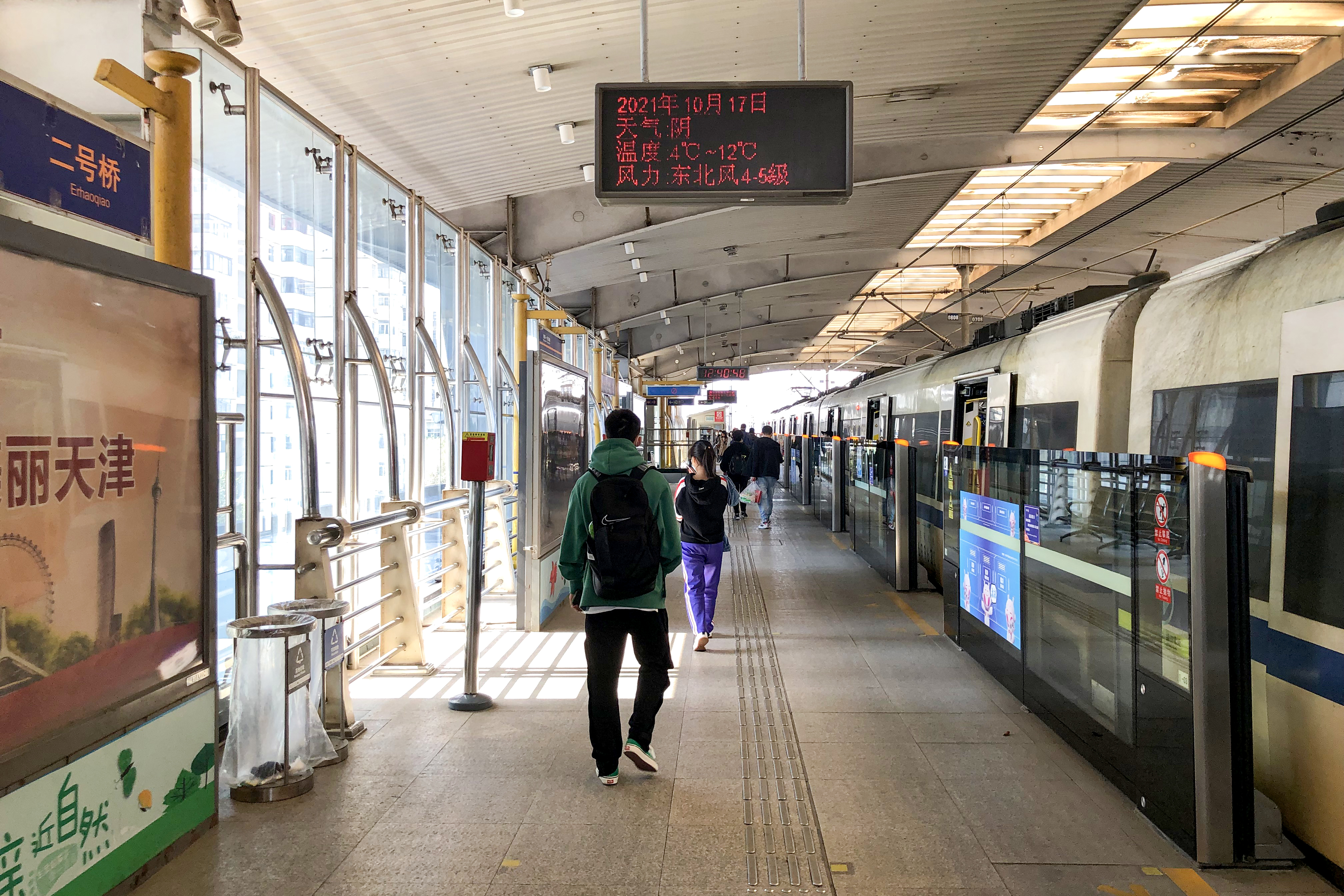
- Platform of Erhaoqiao Station within the subdistrict, 2021

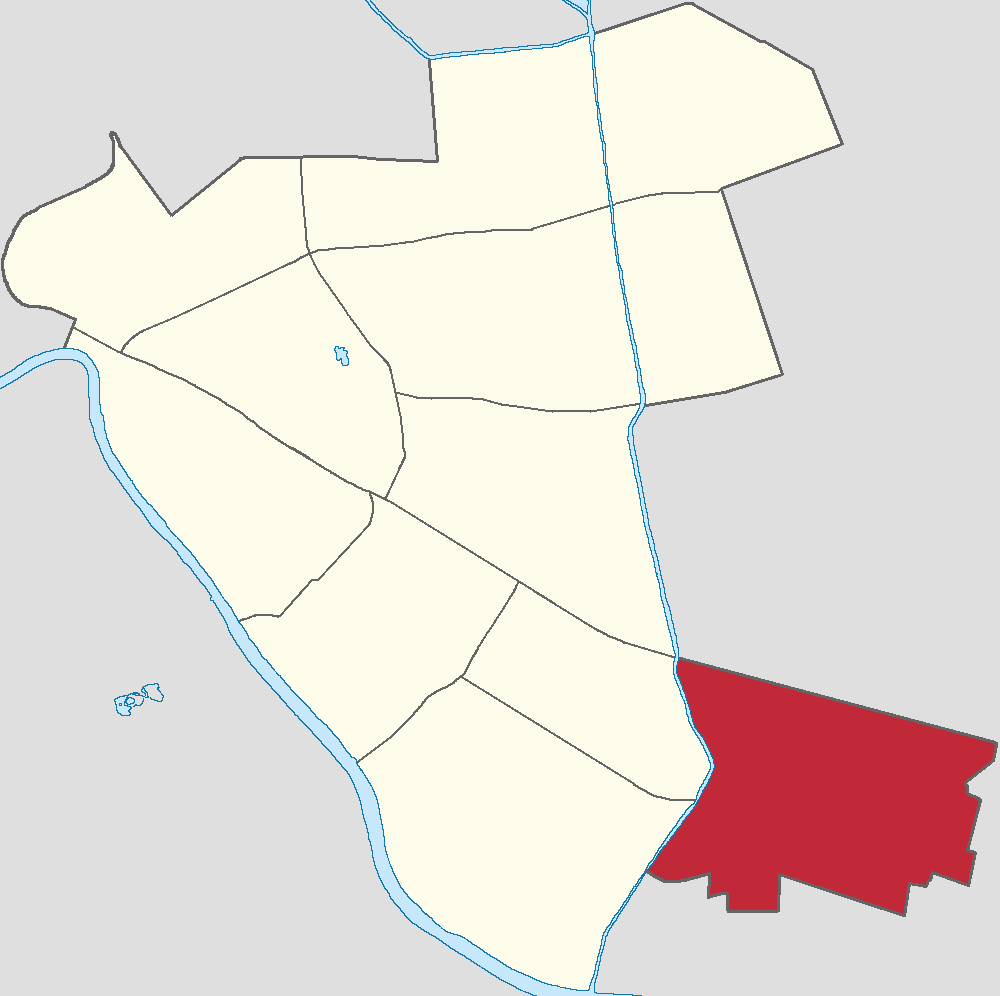
- Location in Hedong District

- Location within Tianjin Location within China
- Coordinates: 39°05′36″N 117°17′31″E
- Country: China
- Municipality: Tianjin
- District: Hedong
- Village-level Divisions: 16 communities

Area
  - Total: 5.35 km^{2} (2.07 sq mi)
- Elevation: 7 m (23 ft)

Population (2010)
  - Total: 61,547
  - Density: 11,500/km^{2} (29,800/sq mi)
- Time zone: UTC+8 (China Standard)
- Postal code: 300180
- Area code: 022

Erhaoqiao Subdistrict (simplified Chinese: 二号桥街道; traditional Chinese: 二號橋街道; pinyin: Èrhàoqiáo Jiēdào) is a subdistrict on southeastern Hedong District, Tianjin. It borders Wanxin and Xinli Subdistricts to the northeast, Zhangguizhuang Subdistrict to the southeast, Wanxin Subdistrict to the southwest, as well as Fumin Road and Zhongshanmen Subdistricts to the northwest. The population of Erhaoqiao Subdistrict was 61,547 in 2010.

The subdistrict was created in 1977 from part of Zhongshanmen Subdistrict. The name Erhaoqiao Literally means "Number 2 Bridge".

== History ==
History of Erhaoqiao Subdistrict
Year	Status	Part of
1952 - 1956	Within Zhongshanmen Worker's New Village	4th District, Tianjin
1956 - 1961	Within Zhongshanmen Subdistrict	Hedong District, Tianin
1961 - 1963	Within Zhongshanmen People's Commune	Hedong District, Tianin
1963 - 1966	Within Zhongshanmen Subdistrict	Hedong District, Tianin
1966 - 1968	Within Zhongshanmen Subdistrict	Dongfeng District, Tianjin
1968 - 1977	Within Zhongshanmenjie Revolutionary Committee	Hedong District, Tianjin
1977–present	Erhaoqiao Subdistrict	Hedong District, Tianjin

== Administrative divisions ==
As of the year 2021, Erhaoqiao Subdistrict covered 16 communities. They are organized in the list below:

Subdivision names	Name transliterations
金地紫乐名轩	Jindi Zile Mingxuan
龙峰嘉园	Longfeng Jiayuan
地毯路	Ditanglu
红旗巷	Hongqixiang
建新东里第一	Jianxin Dongli Diyi
建新东里第二	Jianxin Dongli Di'er
福天里	Futianli
福东里	Fudongli
福东北里	Dufong Beili
黄岩里	Huangyanli
安吉花园	Anji Huayuan
宁月花园	Ningyue Huayuan
陶然庭苑	Taoran Tingyuan
明家庄园	Mingjia Zhuangyuan
靓东花园	Liangdong Huayuan
东泰家园	Dongtai Huayuan
