= Fuminlu Subdistrict =

Fuminlu Subdistrict 富民路街道
- Subdistrict
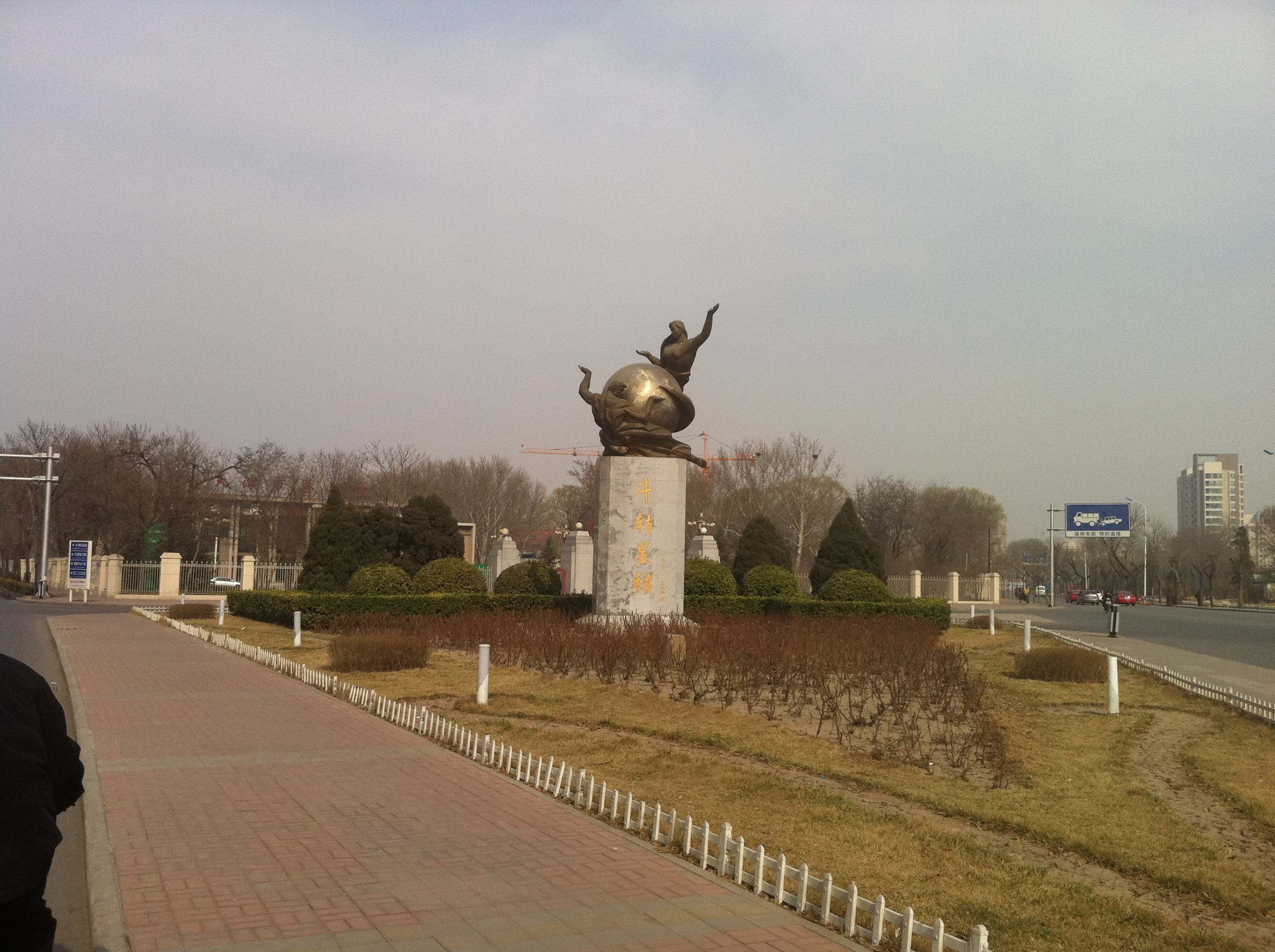
- Statue along Guanghua Road, northwest of the subdistrict, 2011

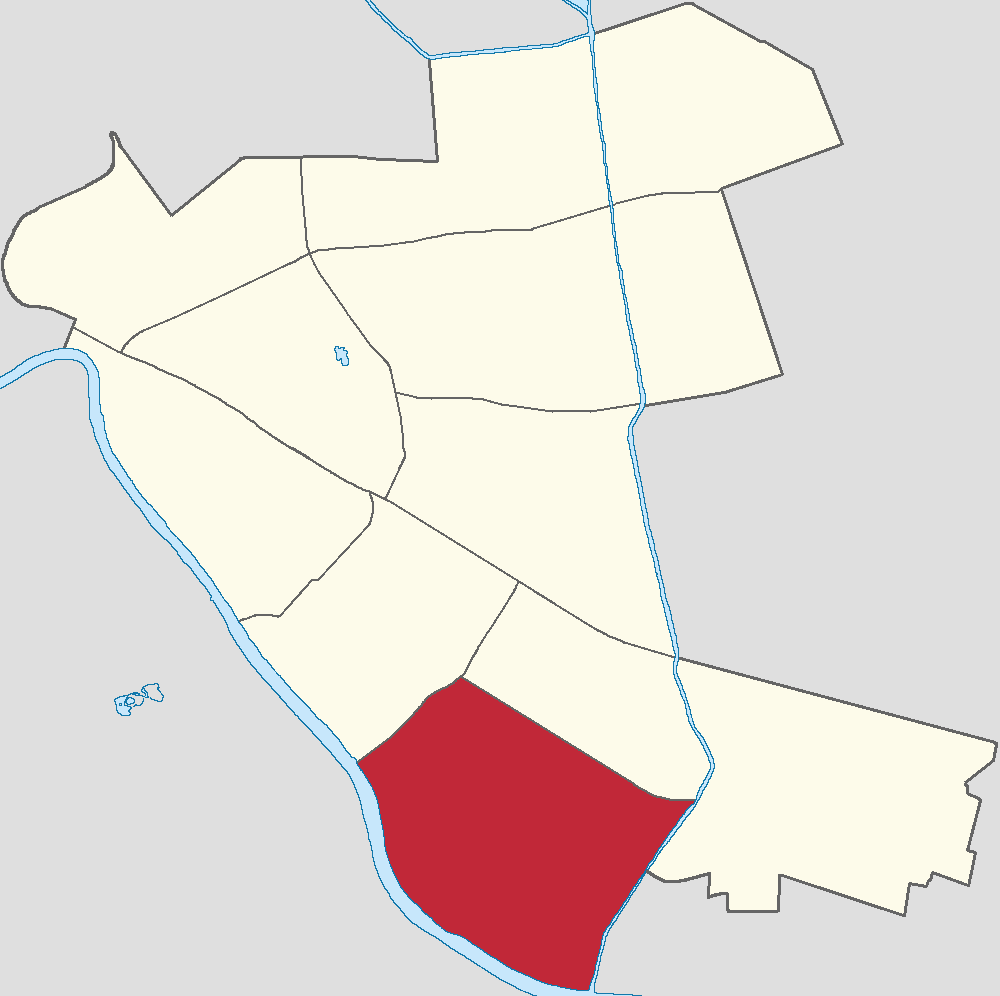
- Location in Hedong District

- Location within Tianjin Location within China
- Coordinates: 39°05′15″N 117°15′03″E
- Country: China
- Municipality: Tianjin
- District: Hedong
- Village-level Divisions: 11 communities

Area
  - Total: 5.26 km^{2} (2.03 sq mi)
- Elevation: 6 m (20 ft)

Population (2010)
  - Total: 45,419
  - Density: 8,630/km^{2} (22,400/sq mi)
- Time zone: UTC+8 (China Standard)
- Postal code: 300182
- Area code: 022

Fuminlu Subdistrict (Chinese: 富民路街道; pinyin: Fùmínlù Jiēdào) is a subdistrict situated in the southwest of Hedong District, Tianjin. it shares border with Zhongshanmen and Erhaoqiao Subdistricts to the northeast, Wanxin Subdistrict to the southeast, Chentangzhuang and Guajiasi Subdistricts to the southwest, and Dazhigu Subdistrict to the northwest. According to the 2020 Chinese Census, the subdistrict had a population of 45,419.

The subdistrict was named after Fumin (Chinese: 富民; lit. 'Enrich the People') Road that runs through it.

== History ==
Timeline of Fuminlu's History
Year	Status	Within
1954 - 1956	Zhengjiazhuang Subdistrict	4th District, Tianjin
1956 - 1966	Zhengzhuangzi Subdistrict (Integrated Jiagudao Subdistrict in 1959)	Hedong District, Tianjin
1966 - 1968	Zhengzhuangzi Subdistrict (Integrated Jiagudao Subdistrict in 1959)	Dongfeng District, Tianjin
1968 - 1978	Zhengzhuangzi Revolutionary Committee	Hedong District, Tianjin
1978–present	Fuminlu Subdistrict	Hedong District, Tianjin

== Administrative divisions ==
In 2021, Fuminlu Subdistrict oversaw 11 communities. They are listed as follows:

Subdivision names	Name transliterations
天鼎	Tianding
天琴里	Tianqinli
滨河新苑	Binhe Xinyuan
天研	Tianyan
万明里	Wanmingxing
富民东里	Fumin Dongli
军旅公寓	Junlü Gongyu
滨河庭苑	Binhe Tingyuan
金月湾花园	Jinyuewan Huayuan
雅仕嘉园	Yashi Jiayuan
雍景湾	Yongjingwan
