= Tangjiakou Subdistrict =

Tangjiakou Subdistrict 唐家口街道
- Subdistrict
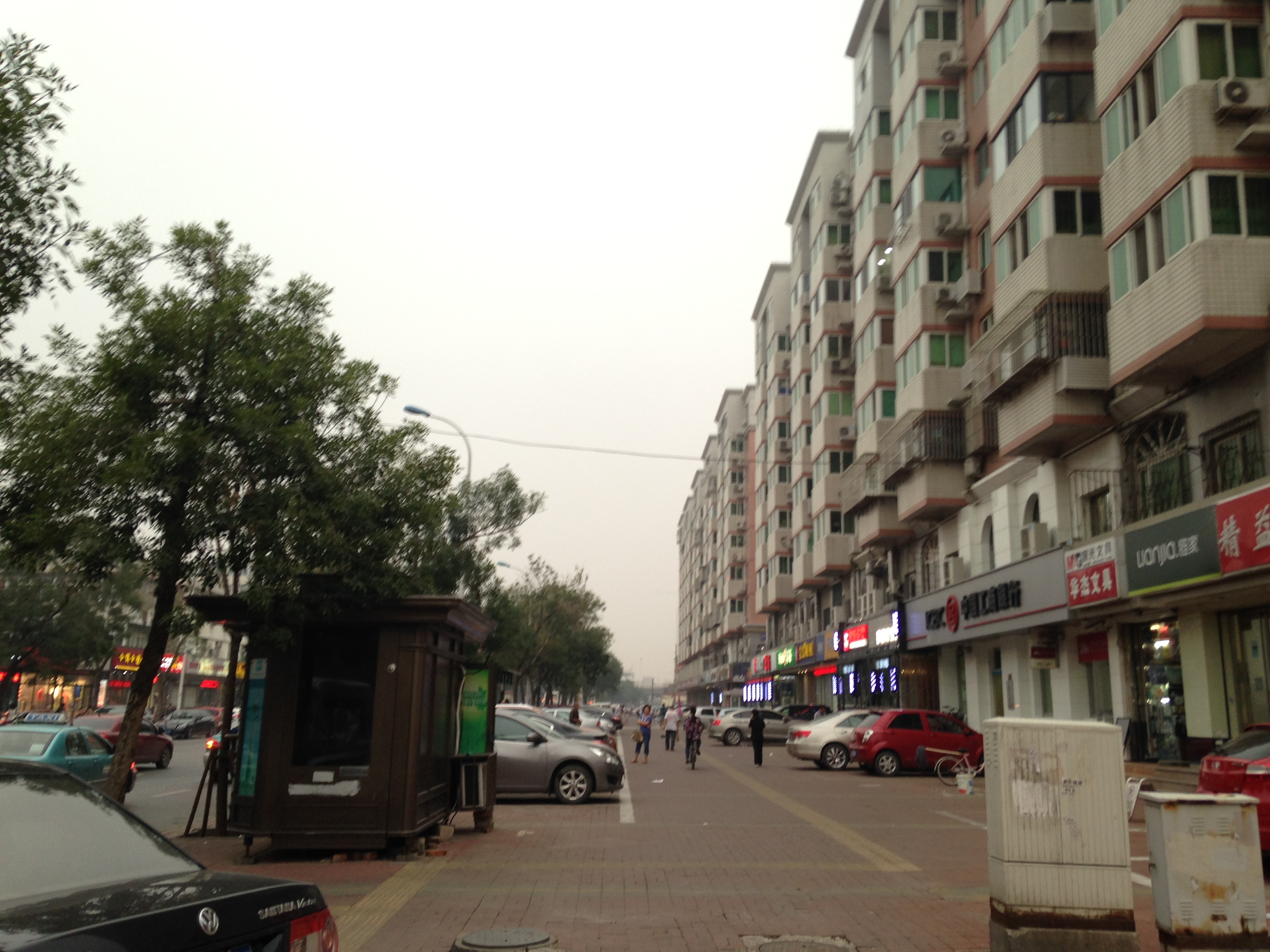
- Chenglin Avenue within the subdistrict, 2016

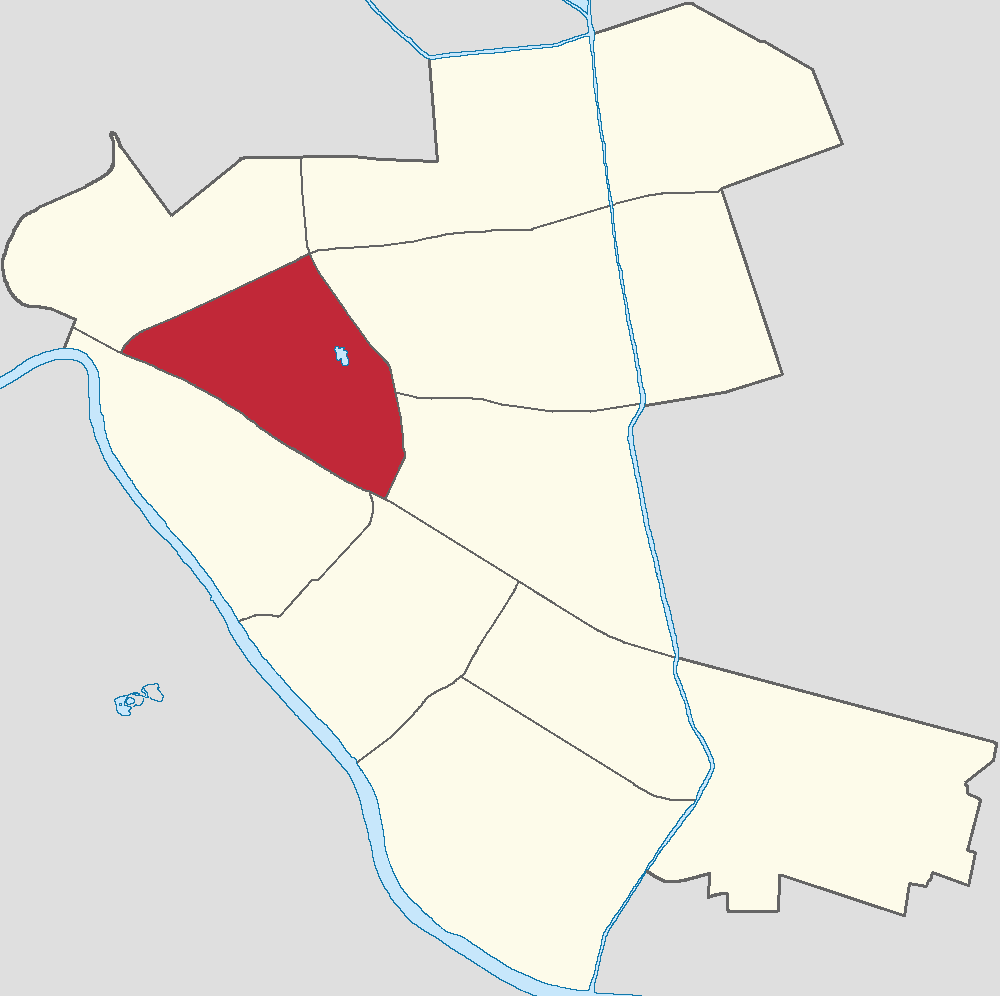
- Location of Tangjiakou Subdistrict within Hedong District

- Location within Tianjin Location within China
- Coordinates: 39°07′40″N 117°14′06″E
- Country: China
- Municipality: Tianjin
- District: Hedong
- Village-level Divisions: 12 communities

Area
  - Total: 2.8 km^{2} (1.1 sq mi)
- Elevation: 7 m (23 ft)

Population (2010)
  - Total: 72,845
  - Density: 26,000/km^{2} (67,000/sq mi)
- Time zone: UTC+8 (China Standard)
- Postal code: 300160
- Area code: 022

Tangjiakou Subdistrict (Chinese: 唐家口街道; pinyin: Tángjiākǒu Jiēdào) is a subdistrict located on the western side of Hedong District, Tianjin. it borders Xiangyanglou and Shanghang Road Subdistricts to its east, Dazhigu and Dawangzhuang Subdistricts to its south, and Chunhua Subdistrict to its northwest. It had a total population of 72,845 as of 2010.

Its name can be translated as "Tang family's Gate".

== History ==
History of Tangjiakou Subdistrict
Year	Status	Belong to
1956 - 1961	Tangjiakou Subdistrict	Hedong District, Tianjin
1961 - 1963	Tangjiakou People's Commune	Hedong District, Tianjin
1963 - 1966	Tangjiakou Subdistrict	Hedong District, Tianjin
1966 - 1968	Tangjiakou Subdistrict	Dongfeng District, Tianjin
1968 - 1978	Tangjiakou Revolutionary Committee	Hedong District, Tianjin
1978–present	Tangjiakou Subdistrict	Hedong District, Tianjin

== Administrative divisions ==
By the end of 2021, Tangjiakou Subdistrict administered 12 communities. They are, by the order of their Administrative Division Codes:

Subdivision names	Name transliterations
唐家口南里	Tangjiakou Nanli
新开路	Xinkailu
嘉华里	Jiahuali
红星路	Hongxinglu
唐家口新村六段	Tangjiakou Xincun Liuduan
长征路	Changzhenglu
工业大学	Gongye Daxue
久福园	Jiufuyuan
卫国道	Weiguodao
华馨公寓	Huaxing Gongyu
南横街	Nanhengjie
御景嘉园	Yujing Jiayuan
