= Changzhou Avenue Subdistrict =

Changzhou Street Subdistrict 常州道街道
- Subdistrict
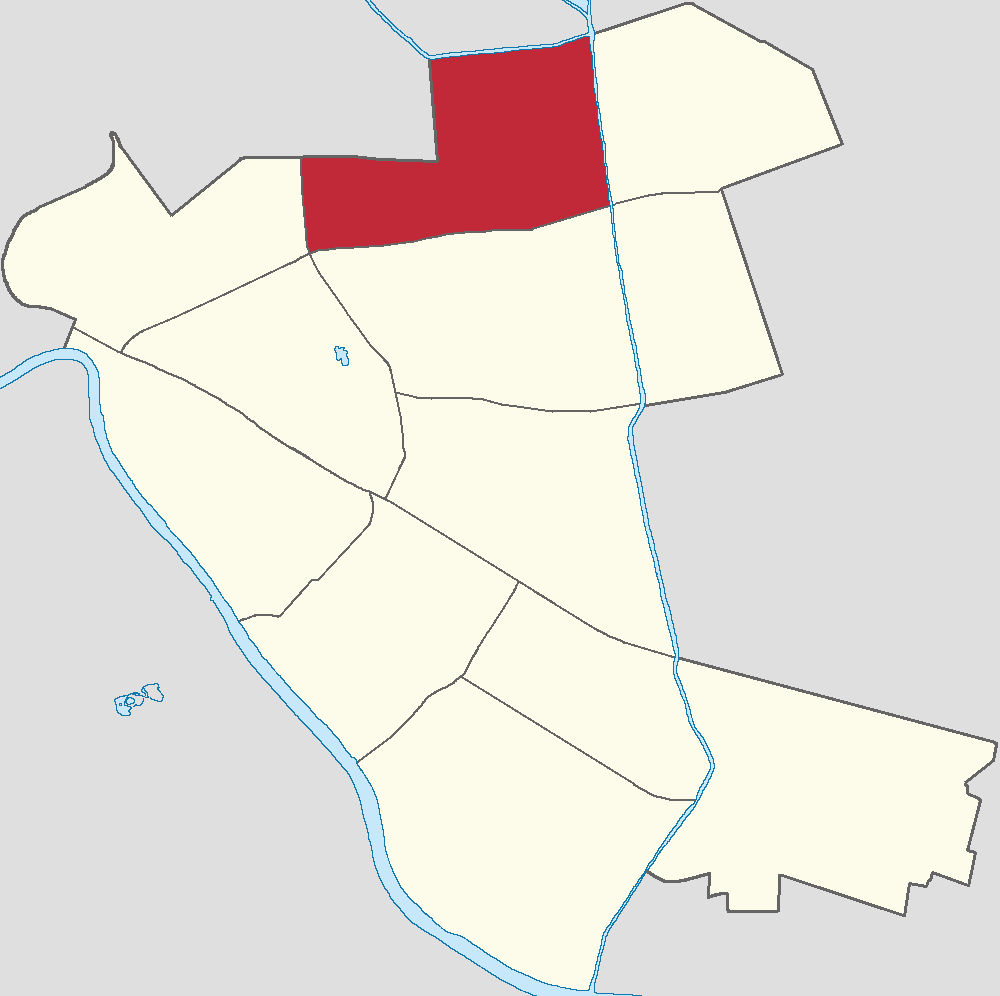
- Location in Hedong District

- Location within Tianjin Location within China
- Coordinates: 39°08′44″N 117°14′05″E
- Country: China
- Municipality: Tianjin
- District: Hedong
- Village-level Divisions: 13 communities

Area
  - Total: 3.57 km^{2} (1.38 sq mi)
- Elevation: 6 m (20 ft)

Population (2010)
  - Total: 51,447
  - Density: 14,400/km^{2} (37,300/sq mi)
- Time zone: UTC+8 (China Standard)
- Postal code: 300150
- Area code: 022

Changzhou Avenue Subdistrict (Chinese: 常州道街道; pinyin: Chángzhōudào Jiēdào) is a subdistrict situated in the northern portion of Hedong District, Tianjin. it shares border with Yueyahe and Huaming Subdistricts to the north, Lushan Avenue Subdistrict to the east, Xiangyanglou Subdistrict to the south, and Chunhua Subdistrict to the west. According to the 2010 Chinese Census, the subdistrict had 51,447 inhabitants under its administration.

The subdistrict was created in 1981. Its name corresponds to Changzhou Avenue that runs through it.

== Administrative divisions ==
As of 2021, Changzhou Avenue Subdistrict covered these 13 communities:

| Subdivision names | Name transliterations |
|---|---|
| 常州里第一 | Changzhouli Diyi |
| 常州里第二 | Changzhouli Di'er |
| 常州里第三 | Changzhouli DIsan |
| 东惠 | Donghui |
| 靖泰里 | Jingtaili |
| 东瑞 | Dongrui |
| 临营西里 | Linying Xili |
| 益寿东里 | Yishou Dongli |
| 近营里 | Jinyingli |
| 爱营里 | Aiyingli |
| 祥泰公寓 | Xiangtai Gongyu |
| 盛世家园 | Shengshi Jiayuan |
| 红城 | Hongcheng |
