= Tianjin No. 7 Middle School =

School in northern China

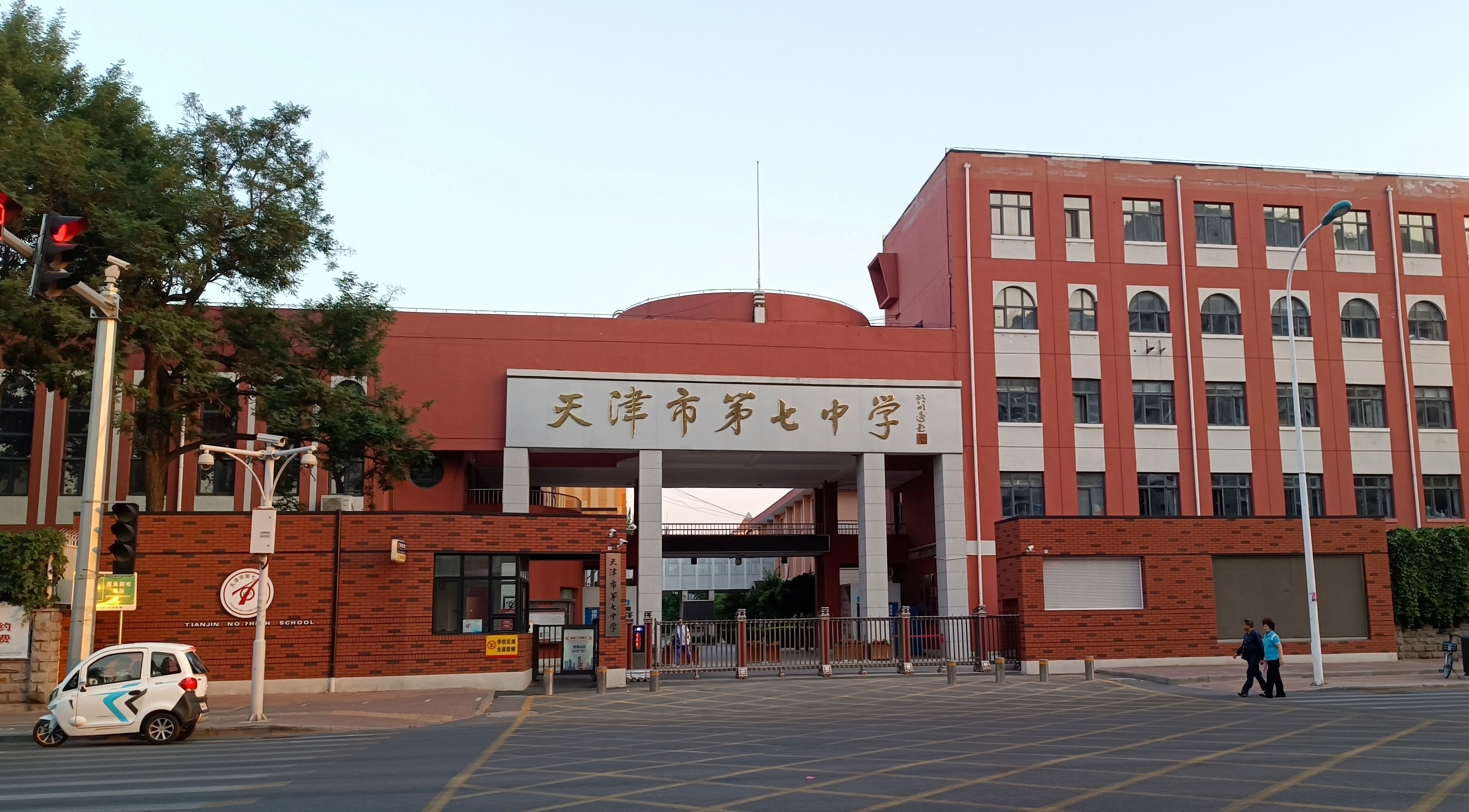
Tianjin No.7 Middle School

Tianjin Middle School No. 7 (Chinese: 天津市第七中学) was founded in 1951, and was one of the earliest key high schools in Tianjin. It is a state model high school which employs eight special-grade teachers and three Hedong District teachers.

As of 2022, the school's principal is Wang Baoqing (王保庆).

== Tibet class ==
Since 2002, the school has had a "Tibet class", a program for Tibetan students. This program is successful in preparing students for university studies; for five years leading up to 2022, 100% of graduating Tibet class students were accepted to undergraduate programs.
