= Tianjin Tiechang Subdistrict =

Tianjin Tiechang Subdistrict 天津铁厂街道
- Subdistrict
- Location within Hebei Location within China
- Coordinates: 36°35′09″N 113°43′54″E
- Country: China
- Municipality: Tianjin
- District: Hedong
- Village-level Divisions: 6 communities

Area
  - Total: 41.5 km^{2} (16.0 sq mi)
- Elevation: 620 m (2,030 ft)

Population (2010)
  - Total: 29,769
  - Density: 717/km^{2} (1,860/sq mi)
- Time zone: UTC+8 (China Standard)
- Postal code: 056404
- Area code: 022

Tianjin Tiechang Subdistrict (simplified Chinese: 天津铁厂街道; traditional Chinese: 天津鐵廠街道; pinyin: Tiānjīn Tiěchǎng Jiēdào) is a subdistrict administered by Hedong District, Tianjin, but is actually situated within She County, Handan, Hebei. In the year 2010, its population was 29,769.

The subdistrict was created in 1988. It was named after Tianjin Steel Mill, a factory that was first established in 1969.

== Administrative divisions ==
As of 2021, Tianjin Tiechang Subdistrict oversaw 6 communities. They are listed in the table below:

Subdivision names	Name transliterations
神山	Shenshan
神黄	Shenhuang
黄花脑	Huanghuanao
旁岐	Pangqi
寨坡山	Zhaiposhan
新家园	Xinjiayuan
