= Zhongshanmen station =

Metro station in Tianjin, China

Zhongshanmen 中山门
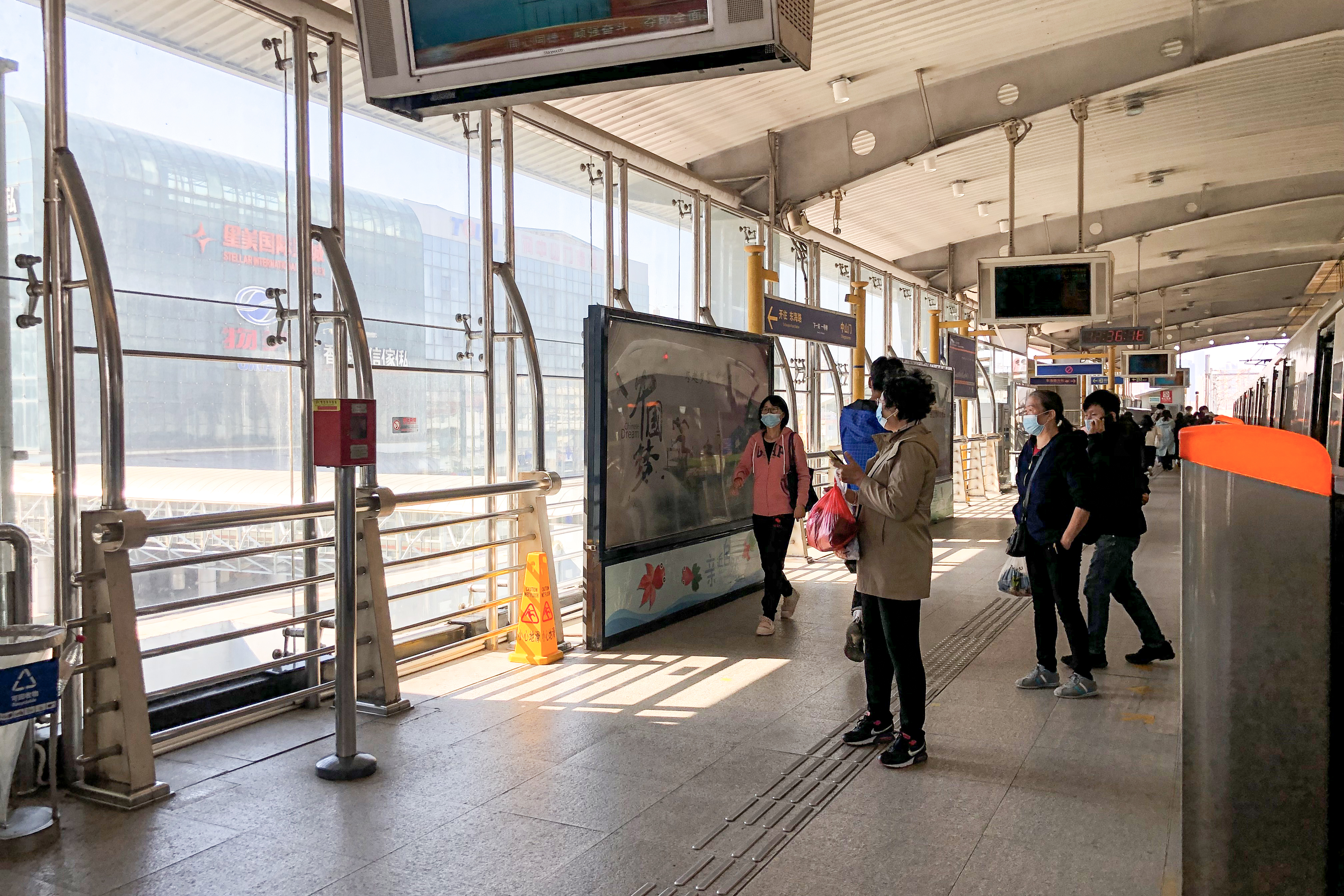

General information
- Location: Hedong District, Tianjin; China
- Coordinates: 39.0998°N 117.2581°E
- Operated by: Binhai Mass Transit Co. Ltd.
- Line: Line 9

Construction
- Structure type: Elevated

History
- Opened: 28 March 2004

Services
Preceding station	Tianjin Metro	Following station
Dongxinglu towards Tianjinzhan	Line 9	Yihaoqiao towards Donghailu
Location

Zhongshanmen Station (Chinese: 中山门站) is a station of Line 9 of the Tianjin Metro. It started operations on 28 March 2004.
