= Lushan Avenue Subdistrict =

Lushan Street Subdistrict 鲁山道街道
- Subdistrict
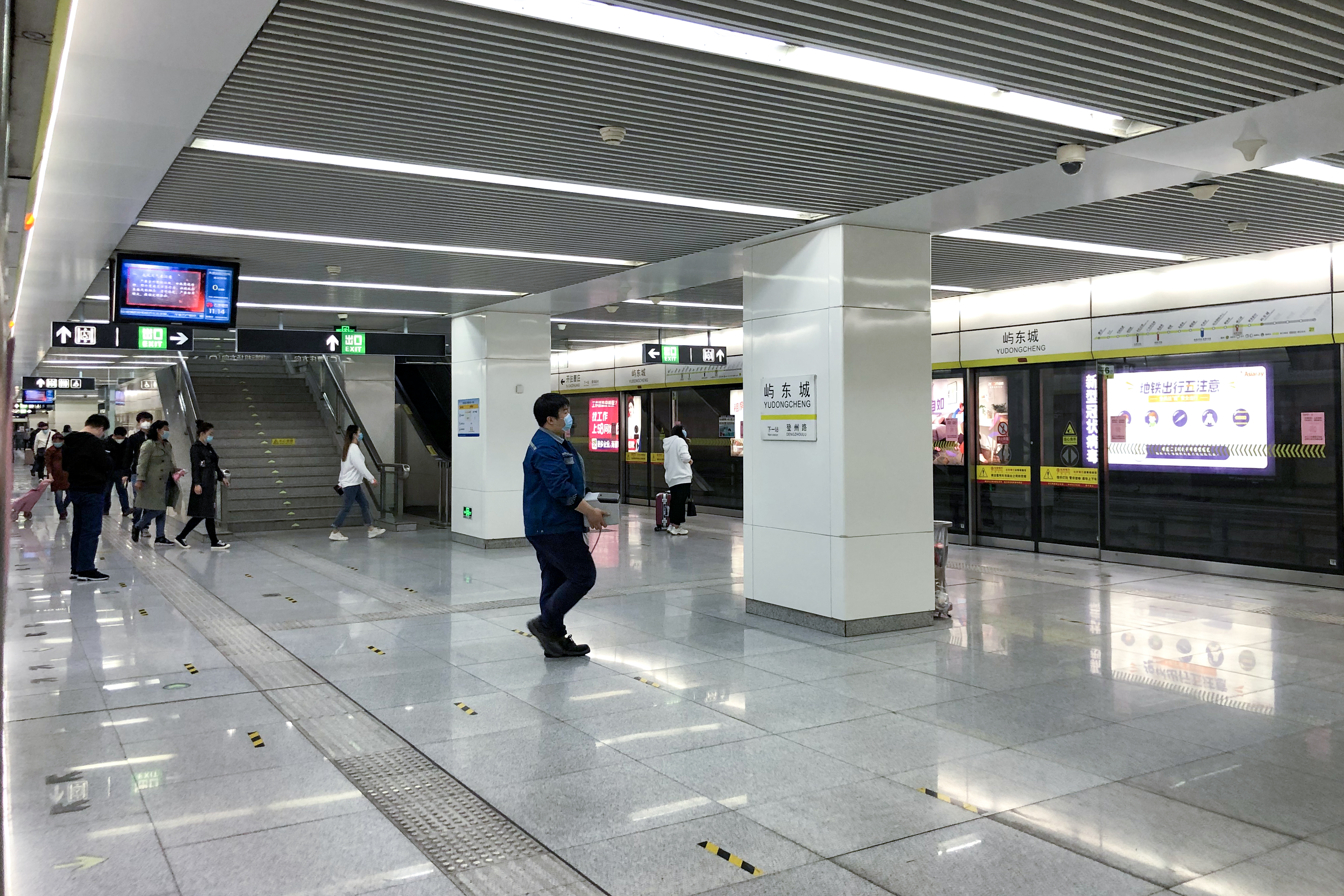
- Platform of Yudongcheng Station on the south of the subdistrict, 2020

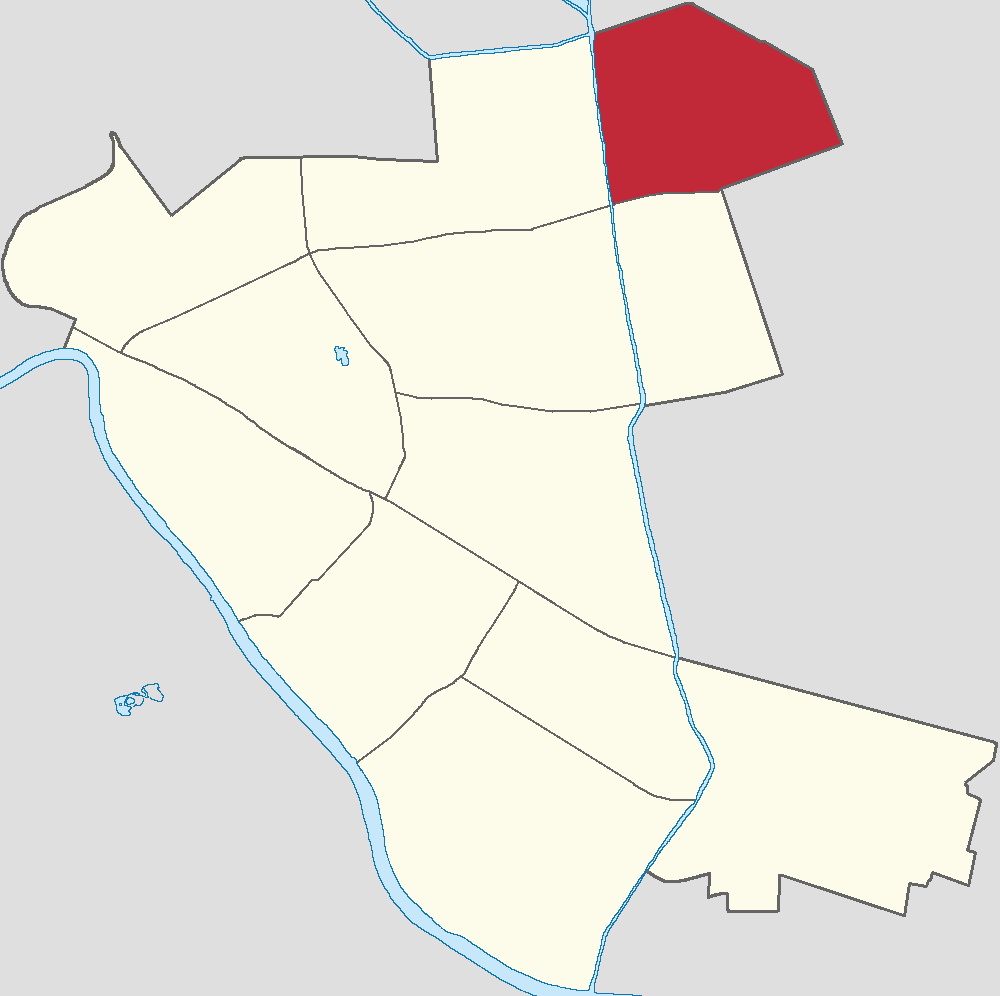
- Location within Hedong District

- Location within Tianjin Location within China
- Coordinates: 39°08′58″N 117°16′32″E
- Country: China
- Municipality: Tianjin
- District: Hedong
- Village-level Divisions: 8 communities

Area
  - Total: 3.02 km^{2} (1.17 sq mi)
- Elevation: 5 m (16 ft)

Population (2010)
  - Total: 43,109
  - Density: 14,300/km^{2} (37,000/sq mi)
- Time zone: UTC+8 (China Standard)
- Postal code: 300171
- Area code: 022

Lushan Avenue Subdistrict (simplified Chinese: 鲁山道街道; traditional Chinese: 魯山道街道; pinyin: Lǔshāndào Jiēdào) is a subdistrict situated inside of Hedong District, Tianjin. it shares border with Huaming Subdistrict to the north and east, Wanxin and Dongxin Subdistricts to the south, and Changzhou Avenue Subdistrict to the west. Its total population was 43,109 as of 2010.

The subdistrict was founded in 1993. Its name literally means "Lu Mountain Avenue".

== Administrative divisions ==
So far in 2021, Lushan Avenue Subdistrict has these 8 communities:

Subdivision names	Name transliterations
皓阳园	Haoyangyuan
云丽园	Yunliyuan
彩丽园	Cailiyuan
蓝山园	Lanshanyuan
丹荔园	Danliyuan
橙翠园	Chengcuiyuan
金旭园	Jinxuyuan
皓林园	Haolinyuan
