= Hedong, Tianjin =

Hedong 河东区
- District
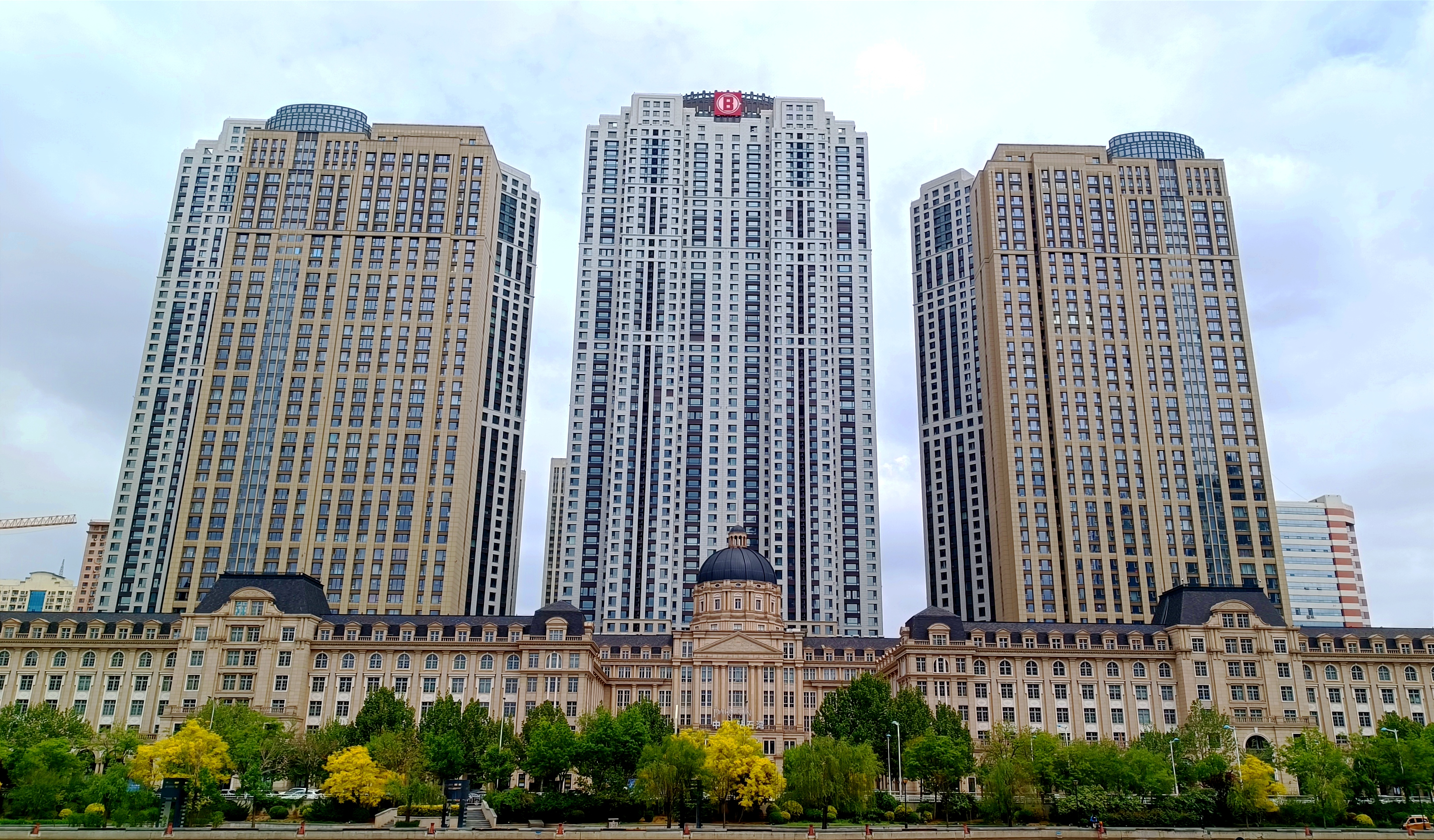
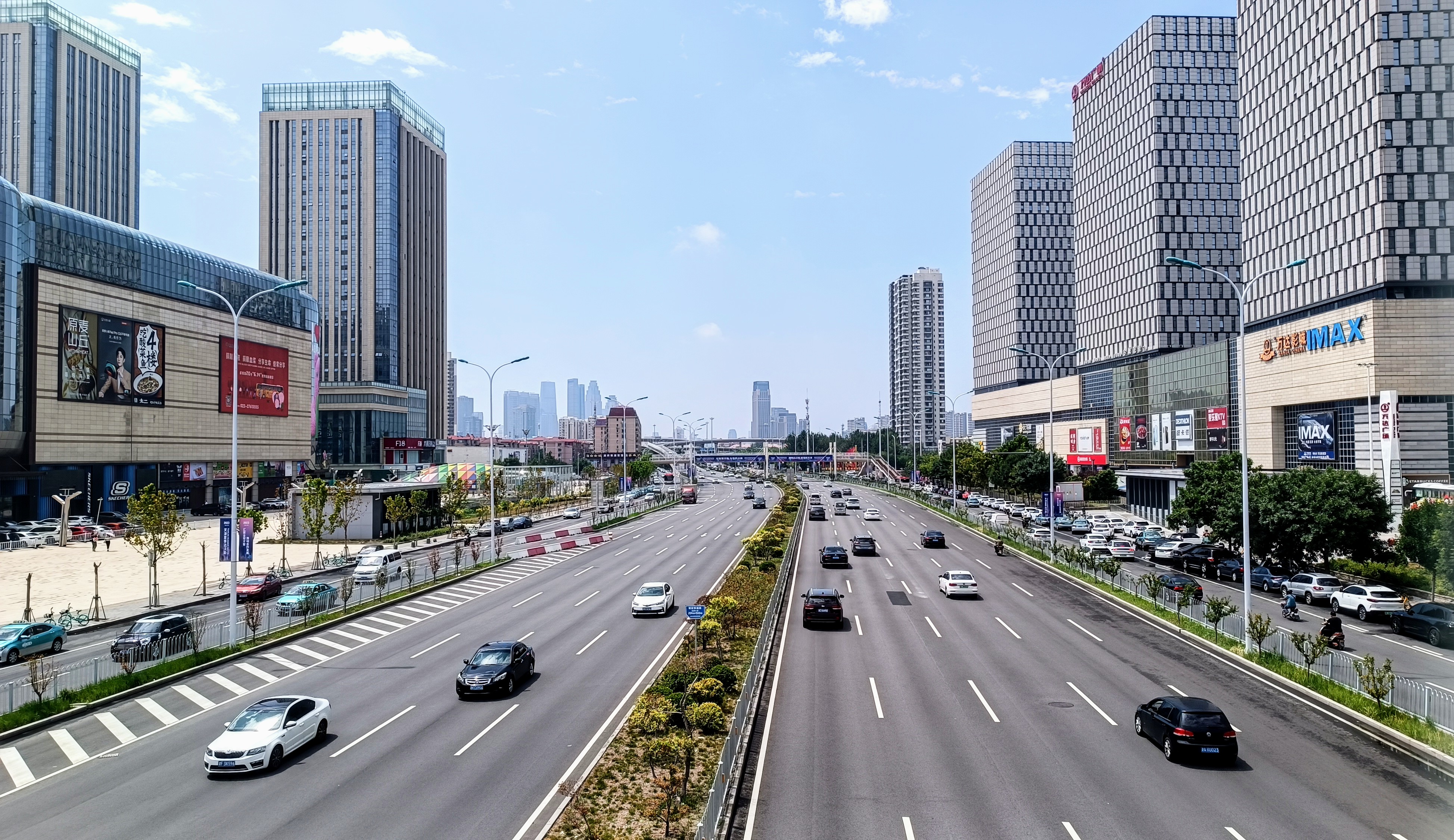
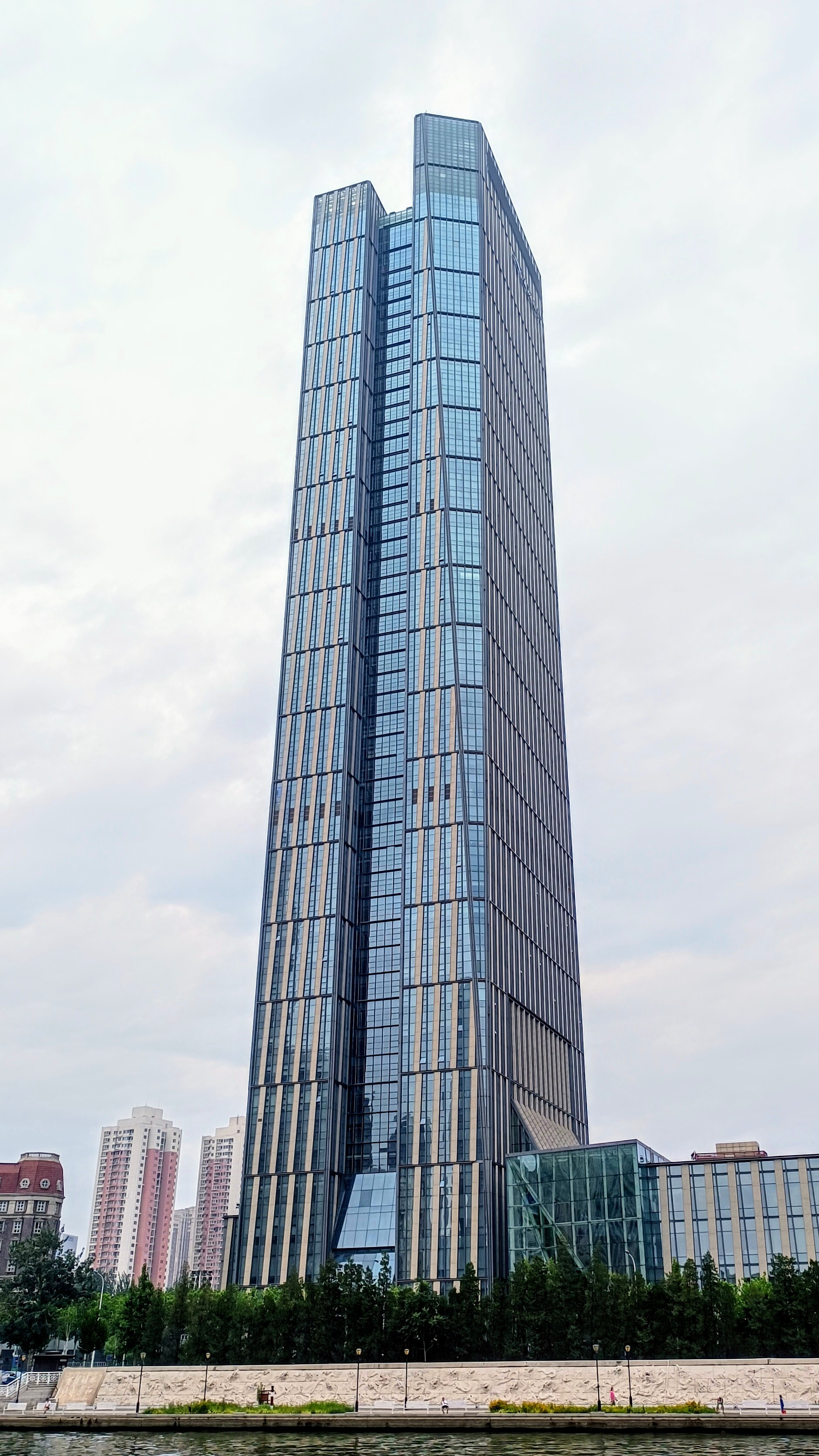
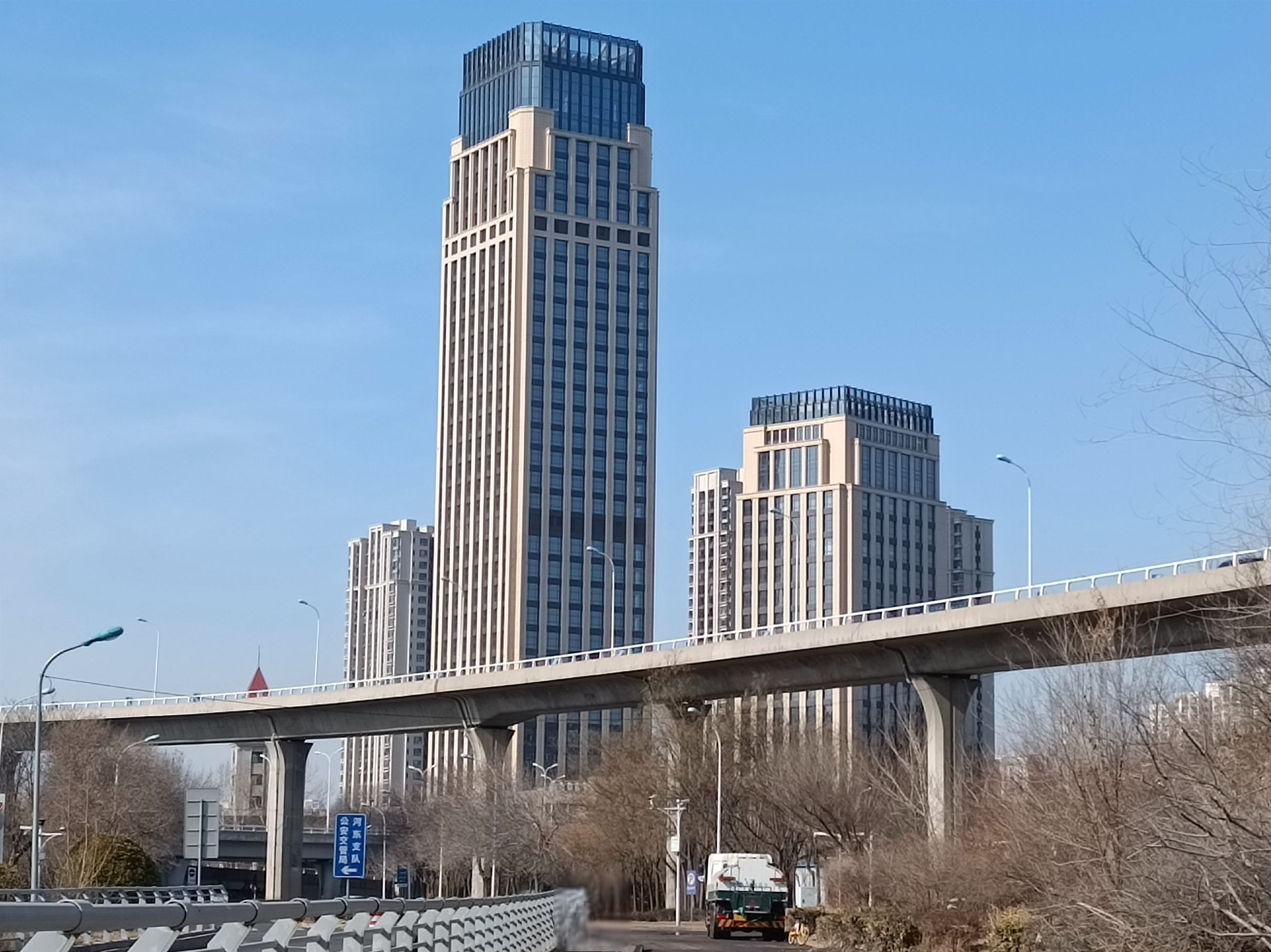
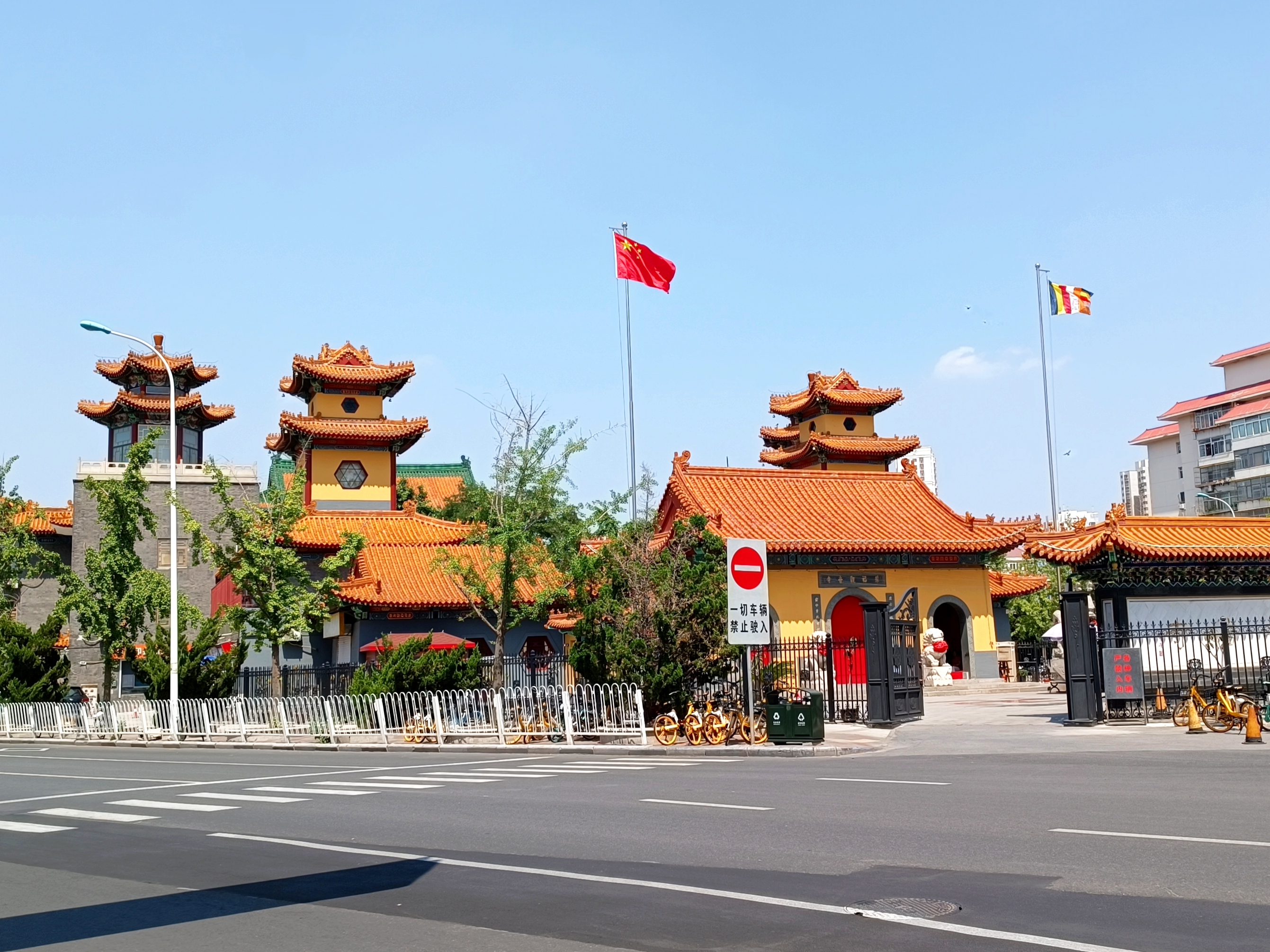
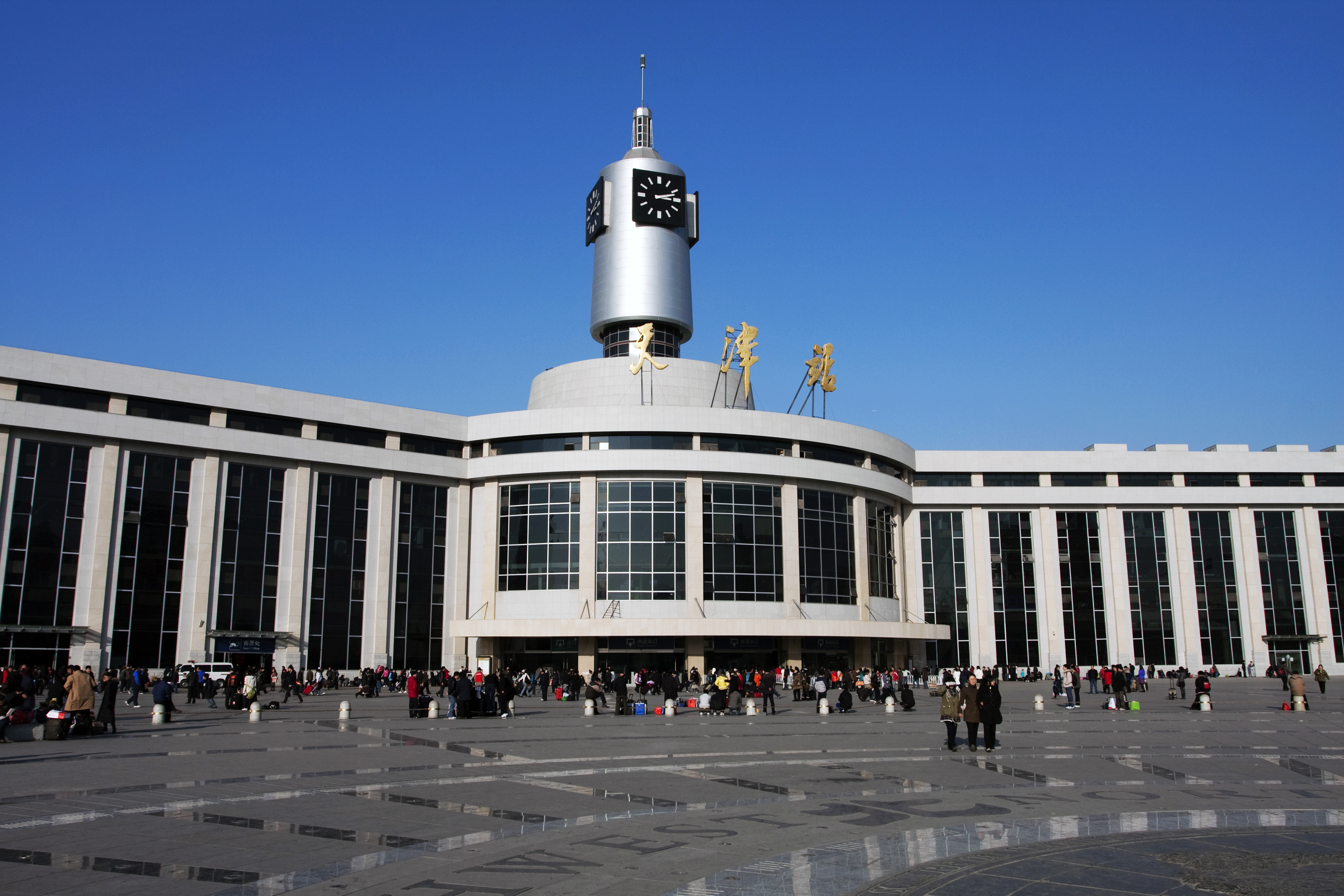
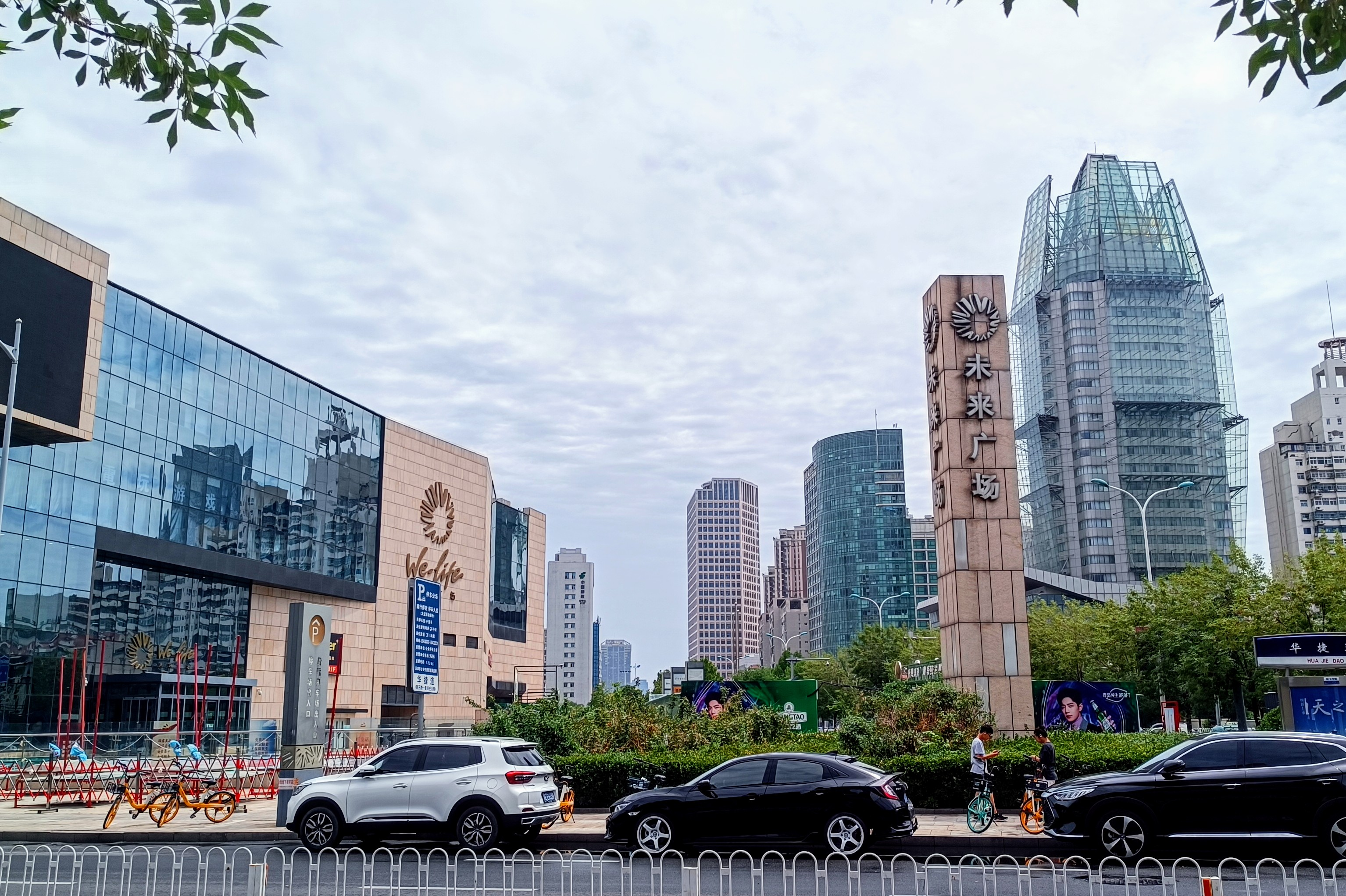
- Interactive map of Hedong
- Coordinates: 39°07′47″N 117°15′04″E
- Country: People's Republic of China
- Municipality: Tianjin
- Township-level divisions: 13 subdistricts

Area
  - Total: 39 km^{2} (15 sq mi)
- Elevation: 6 m (20 ft)

Population (2020)
  - Total: 858,787
  - Density: 22,000/km^{2} (57,000/sq mi)
- Time zone: UTC+8 (China Standard)
- Postal code: 300171
- Area code(s): 0022; Division code: HDQ
Tianjin district map
Subdivisions of Tianjin
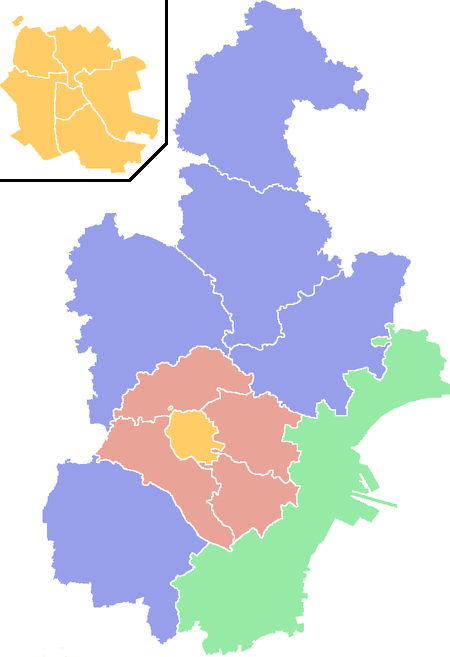
Core districts See inset
| 1 | Heping |
| 2 | Hedong |
| 3 | Hexi |
| 4 | Nankai |
| 5 | Hebei |
| 6 | Hongqiao |
Suburbs
| 7 | Dongli |
| 8 | Xiqing |
| 9 | Jinnan |
| 10 | Beichen |
Binhai and Rural
| 13 | Binhai | 14 | Ninghe |
| 11 | Wuqing | 15 | Jinghai |
| 12 | Baodi | 16 | Ji Zhou |

Hedong District (simplified Chinese: 河东区; traditional Chinese: 河東區; pinyin: Hédōng Qū) is located at the heart of the municipality of Tianjin, People's Republic of China. Its name literally means "east of the river", referring to its location east of the Hai River. Parts of the district were once part of the Russian Concession during the colonial period in the early 20th century.

As of 2020, Hedong District has a population of 858,787. It hosts Tianjin Railway Station, Tianjin Customs House and General Mail Office of Tianjin. It also hosts Tianjin Conservatory of Music and Tianjin Polytechnic University (which used to be a branch of Tianjin University, the oldest university of China).

== History ==
In 1125, the territory of what would become Hedong District was part of Dazhigu, and fell under the control of Jin dynasty. It became a maritime transport hub during the Yuan dynasty. In 1404, the Ming dynasty built a series of military settlement on the southern bank of Hai River, causing the economic center of the region to shift south away from Dazhigu. For the rest of the Ming dynasty, Dazhigu remained part of Jinghai county.

During the Qing dynasty, the area belonged to Wuqing county. After Eight-Nation Alliance occupied Tianjin in 1900, a portion of Wuqing county became part of Russian concession, while a piece of land south of Russian concession was given to Belgian as concession. In 1924, Republic of China regain the control of Russian concession, and set it as the 3rd district. Belgian concession was returned in 1931, where it became the 4th district. The city of Tianjin was occupied by Japan from 1937 to 1945, during which the border of districts within the city was redrawn 4 times.

After the founding of People's Republic of China, the area was divided into the 4th and 5th districts in 1951, and the latter was merged into the 4th district a year later. In 1956, the 4th district was given the current name Hedong. Its name was shortly changed to Dongfeng (Chinese: 东风; lit. 'East Wind') district in 1966, before changing back two years later.

== Administrative divisions ==
There are 13 subdistricts in the district:

| Name | Chinese (S) | Hanyu Pinyin | Population (2010) | Area (km^{2}) |
|---|---|---|---|---|
| Dawangzhuang Subdistrict | 大王庄街道 | Dàwángzhuāng Jiēdào | 65,614 | 3.0 |
| Dazhigu Subdistrict | 大直沽街道 | Dàzhígū Jiēdào | 88,860 | 3.7 |
| Zhongshanmen Subdistrict | 中山门街道 | Zhōngshānmén Jiēdào | 94,762 | 1.29 |
| Fumin Road Subdistrict | 富民路街道 | Fùmínlù Jiēdào | 45,419 | 5.32 |
| Erhaoqiao Subdistrict | 二号桥街道 | Èrhàoqiáo Jiēdào | 61,547 | 5.4 |
| Chunhua Subdistrict | 春华街道 | Chūnhuájiē Jiēdào | 69,829 | 3.13 |
| Tangjiakou Subdistrict | 唐家口街道 | Tángjiākǒu Jiēdào | 72,845 | 2.81 |
| Xiangyanglou Subdistrict | 向阳楼街道 | Xiàngyánglóu Jiēdào | 80,678 | |
| Changzhou Avenue Subdistrict | 常州道街道 | Chángzhōudào Jiēdào | 51,447 | 3.64 |
| Shanghang Road Subdistrict | 上杭路街道 | Shànghánglù Jiēdào | 66,164 | |
| Lushan Avenue Subdistrict | 鲁山道街道 | Lǔshāndào Jiēdào | 90,809 | |
| Dongxin Subdistrict | 东新街道 | Dōngxīn Jiēdào | 43,109 | |
| Tianjin Tiechang Subdistrict | 天津铁厂街道 | Tiānjīn Tiěchǎng Jiēdào | 29,769 | |

== Transportation ==
=== Metro ===
Hedong is currently served by three metro lines operated by Tianjin Metro:

- Line 2 - Tianjinzhan, Yuanyangguojizhongxin, Shunchiqiao, Jingjianglu, Cuifuxincun
- Line 2 - Tianjinzhan
- Line 9 - Tianjinzhan, Dawangzhuang, Shiyijing Road, Zhigu, Dongxing Road, Zhongshanmen, Yihaoqiao, Erhaoqiao

== Education ==
=== Universities ===
- Tianjin Conservatory of Music
- Tianjin Polytechnic

=== High schools ===
- Number Seven High School
- High School Attached to Conservatory of Music
- No. 32 High School

=== Primary schools ===
- Hedong Experimental Primary School
- Hedong First Center Primary School

== Culture and leisure ==
=== Cultural Interests ===
- Tianjin Railway Station
- Tianjin Custom House
- General Mail Office of Tianjin
- Hedong Library
- Music Street

=== Parks ===
- Second Palace Park
- Hedong Park
- Riverside (Hebin) Park

== Hospitals ==
- Tianjin First Center Hospital (Dong Yuan)
- Tianjin Third Center Hospital
- Tianjin Fragrant Hill Hospital
