= Chunhua Subdistrict =

Chunhua Subdistrict 春华街道
- Subdistrict
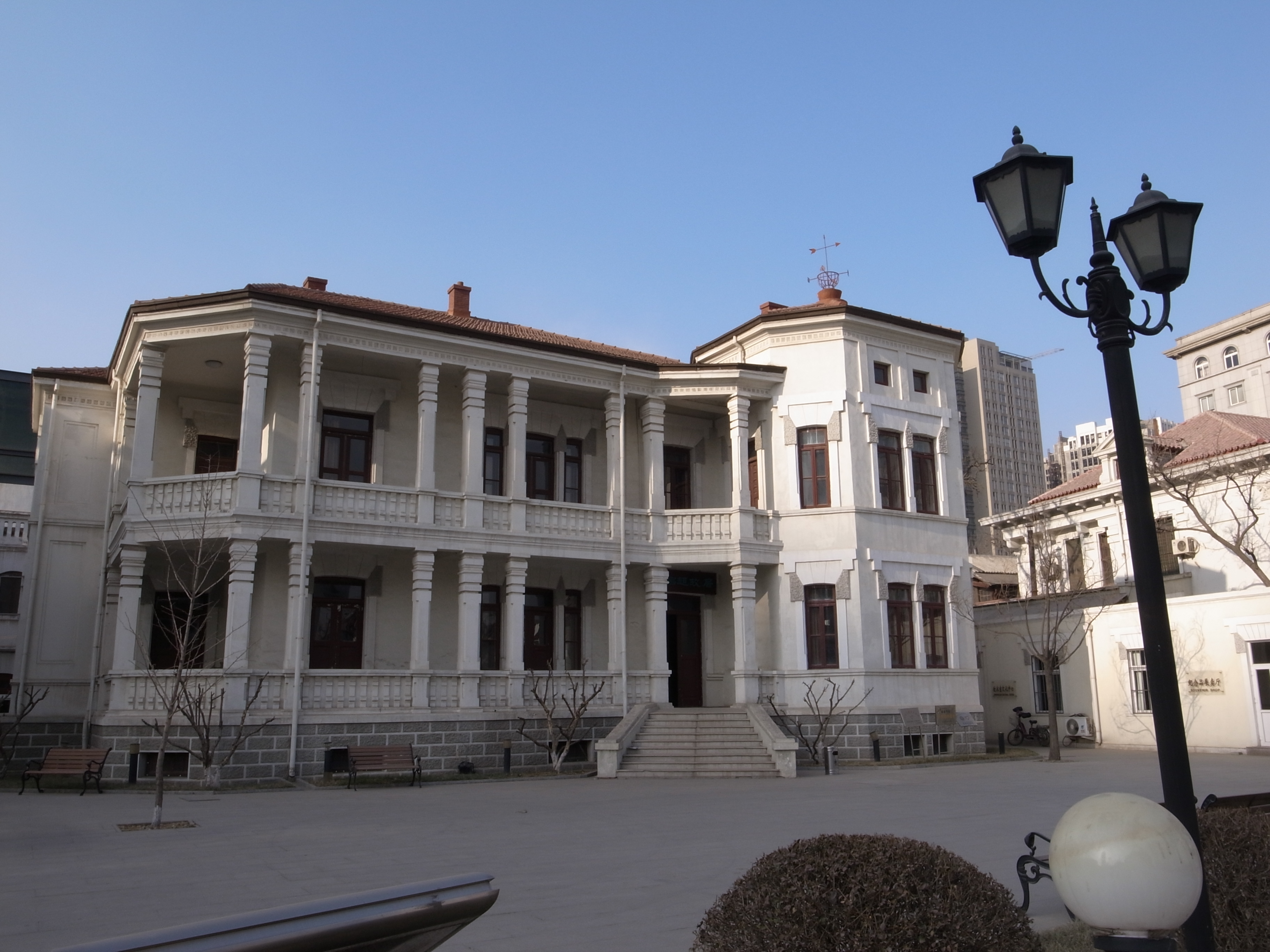
- Former Residence of Liang Qichao within the subdistrict, 2009

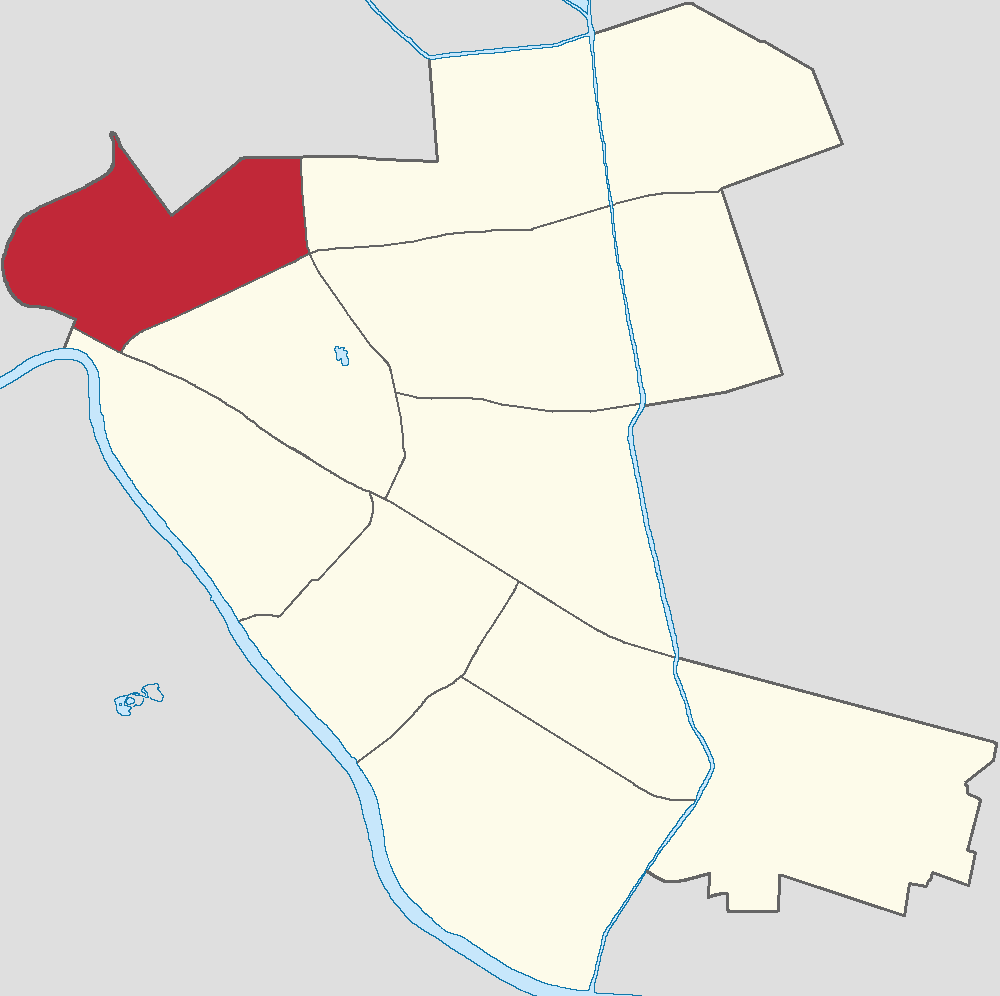
- Location within Hedong District

- Location within Tianjin Location within China
- Coordinates: 39°08′20″N 117°12′08″E
- Country: China
- Municipality: Tianjin
- District: Hedong
- Village-level Divisions: 14 communities

Area
  - Total: 3.13 km^{2} (1.21 sq mi)
- Elevation: 7 m (23 ft)

Population (2010)
  - Total: 69,829
  - Density: 22,300/km^{2} (57,800/sq mi)
- Time zone: UTC+8 (China Standard)
- Postal code: 300171
- Area code: 022

Chunhua Subdistrict (simplified Chinese: 春华街道; traditional Chinese: 春華街道; pinyin: Chūnhuájiē Jiēdào) is one of the 13 subdistricts of Hedong District, Tianjin. it borders Wangchuanchang Subdistrict in the north, Changzhou Road Subdistrict in the east, Tangjiakou and Dawangzhuang Subdistricts in the south, and Guangfudao Subdistrict in the west. It had 69,829 people under its administration as of 2010.

The name Chunhua can be literally translated as "Spring Magnificence".

== History ==
In 1996, the region was divided into 4 subdistricts: Hepingcun, Ligonglou, Shenzhuangzi and Guozhuangzi.

== Administrative divisions ==
As of the time in writing, the following 14 communities constituted Chunhua Subdistrict:

Subdivision names	Name transliterations
惠康家园	Huikang Jiayuan
新博园	Xinboyuan
春华里	Chunhuali
东盈园	Dongyingyuan
新天地家园	Xin Tiandi Jiayuan
华泰里	Huataili
华康里	Huakangli
聚安东园	Ju'an Dongyuan
瑞金里	Ruijinli
秋实园	Qiushiyuan
汇和家园	Huihe Jiayuan
美福园	Meifuyuan
巨福新园	Jufu Xinyuan
华腾里	Huatengli

== Gallery ==
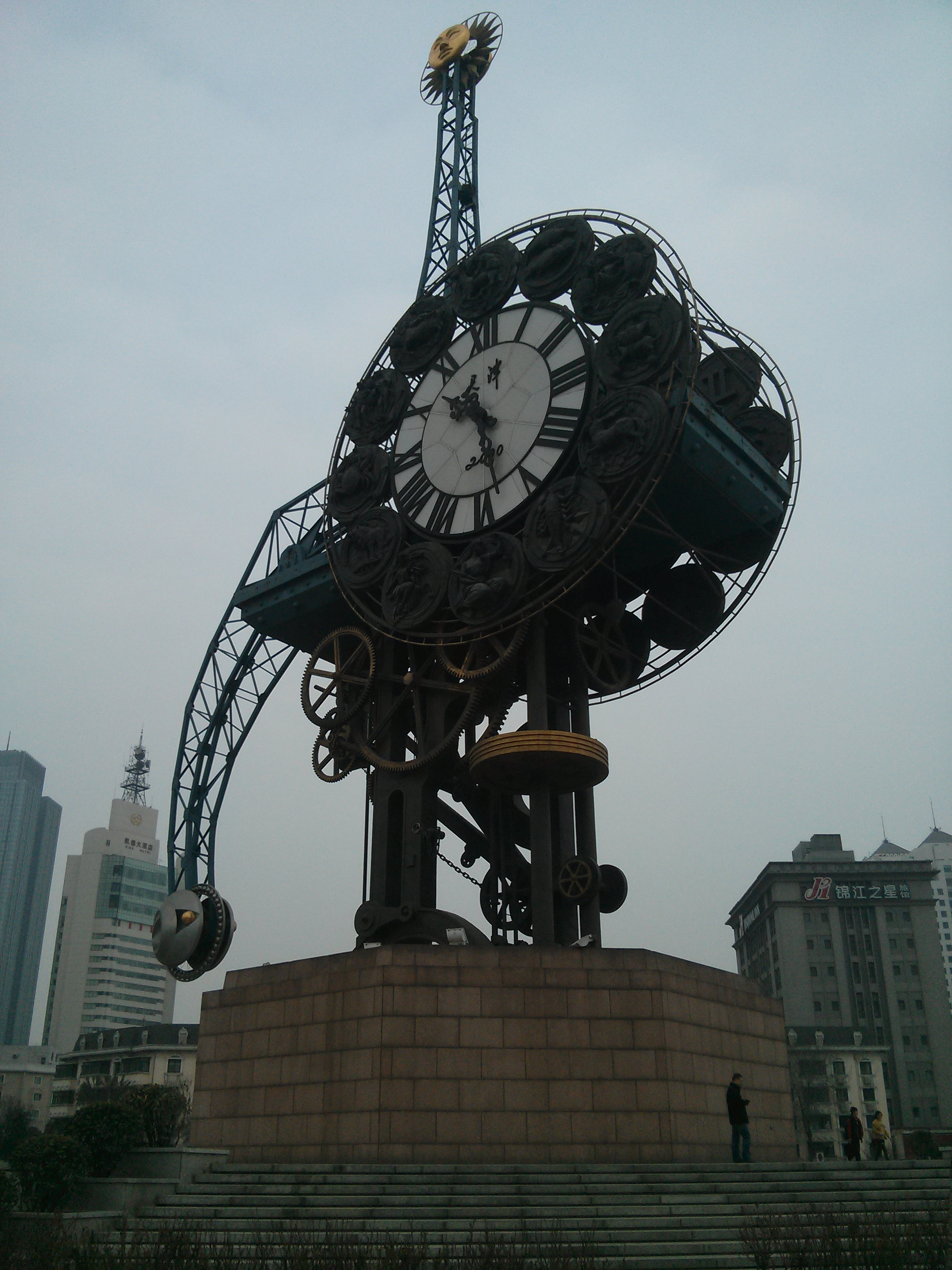
Statue along Xinhuan Road, 2015

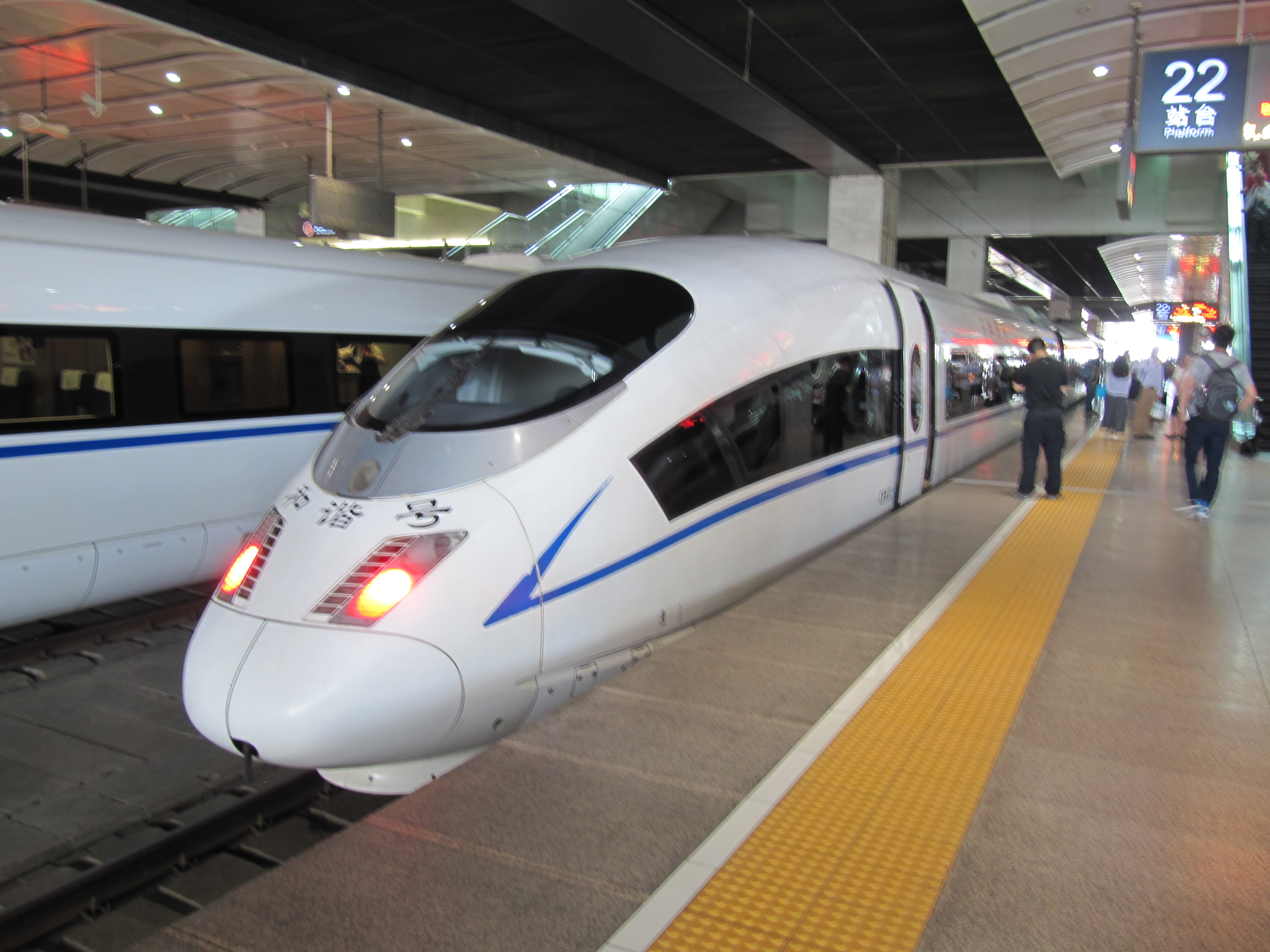
High Speed Train within Tianjin Nan Station, 2015
