= Xiangyanglou Subdistrict =

Xiangyanglou Subdistrict 向阳楼街道
- Subdistrict
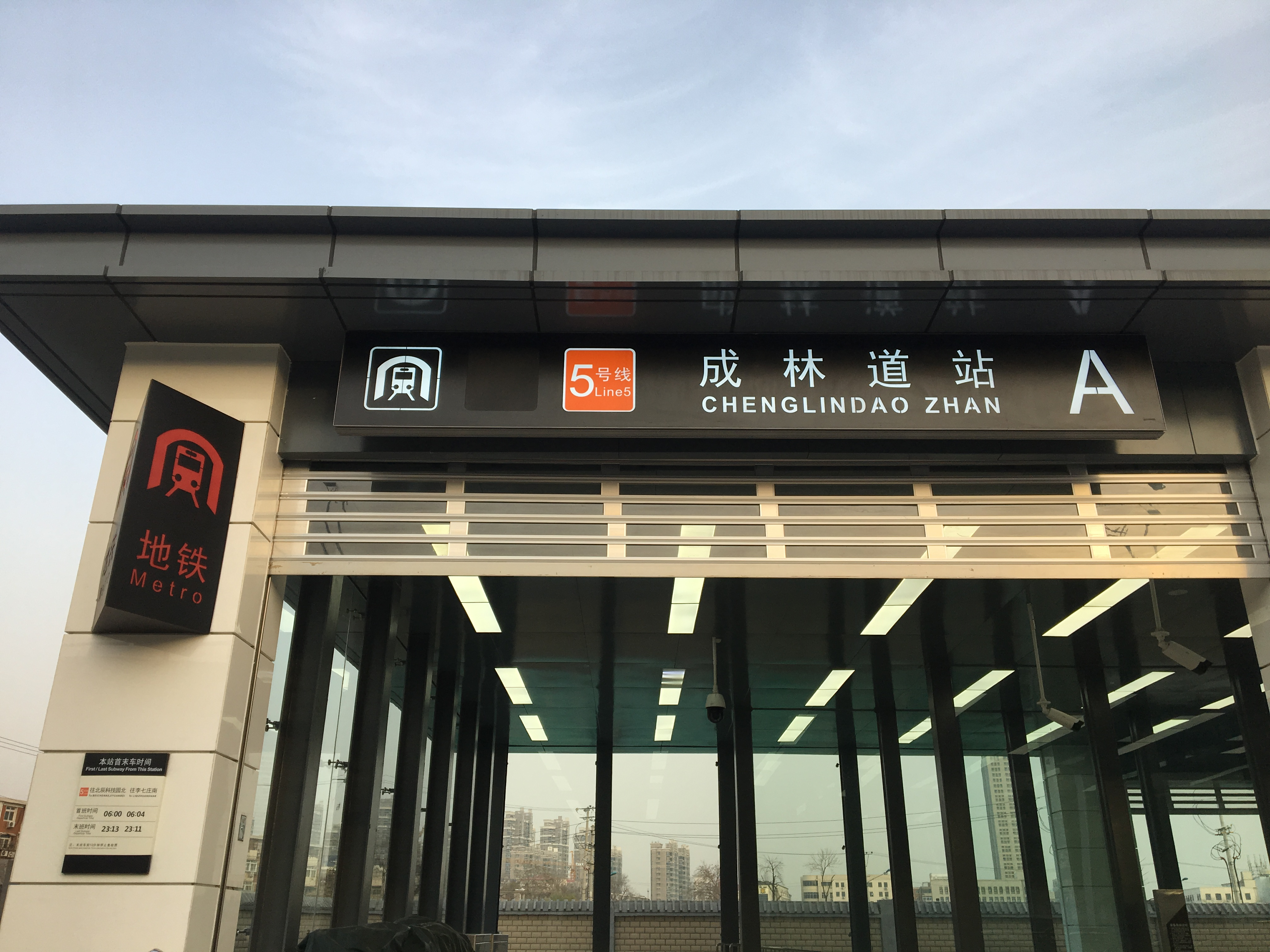
- Exit A of Chenglin Road Station, 2018

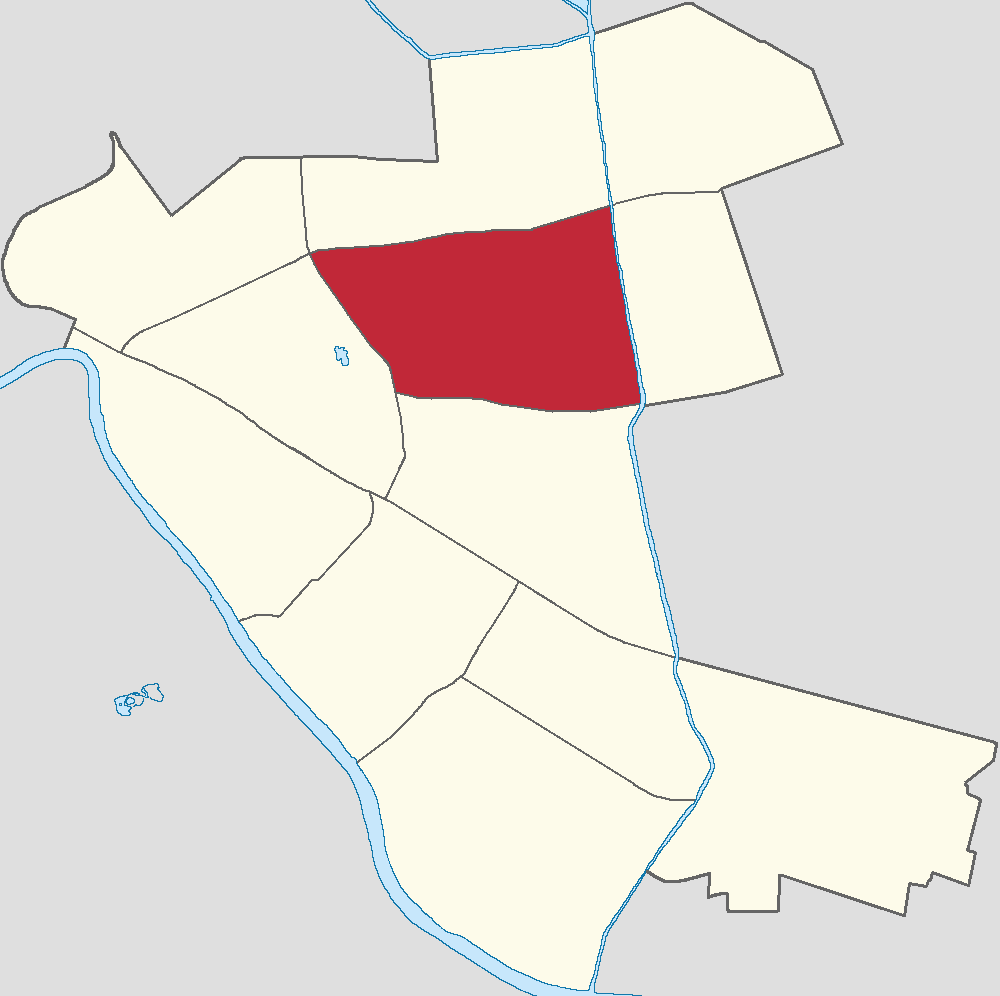
- Location of Xiangyanglou Subdistrict in Hedong District

- Location within Tianjin Location within China
- Coordinates: 39°08′06″N 117°14′27″E
- Country: China
- Municipality: Tianjin
- District: Hedong
- Village-level Divisions: 16 communities

Area
  - Total: 4.01 km^{2} (1.55 sq mi)
- Elevation: 6 m (20 ft)

Population (2010)
  - Total: 80,678
  - Density: 20,100/km^{2} (52,100/sq mi)
- Time zone: UTC+8 (China Standard)
- Postal code: 300161
- Area code: 022

Xiangyanglou Subdistrict (simplified Chinese: 向阳楼街道; traditional Chinese: 向陽樓街道; pinyin: Xiàngyánglóu Jiēdào) is a subdistrict located on the northern portion of Hedong District, Tianjin. it borders Changzhou Street Subdistrict in the north, Dongxin Subdistrict in the east, Shanghang Road Subdistrict in the south, and Tangjiakou Subdistrict in the west. In 2010, the subdistrict was home to 80,678 residents.

The subdistrict was established in 1979 from a portion of Tangjiakou Subdistrict. Its name Xiangyanglou can be roughly translated to "Building that faces the sun".

== Administrative divisions ==
The table below lists all the 16 communities under Xiangyanglou Subdistrict in the year 2021:

Subdivision names	Name transliterations
晨光楼	Chenguanglou
向阳楼	Xiangyanglou
晨阳里	Chenyangli
前进新里	Qianjin Xinli
滇池里	Dianchili
临池里	Linchili
翠韵里	Cuiyunli
顺达西里	Shunda Xili
东局子第一	Dongjuzi Diyi
东局子第二	Dongjuzi Di'er
阳新里	Yangxinli
阳安里	Yang'anli
阳明里	Yangmingli
时尚花园	Shishang Huayuan
昕旺北苑	Xinwang Beiyuan
昕旺南苑	Xinwang Nanyuan
