= Zhongshanmen Subdistrict, Tianjin =

Zhongshanmen Subdistrict 中山门街道
- Subdistrict
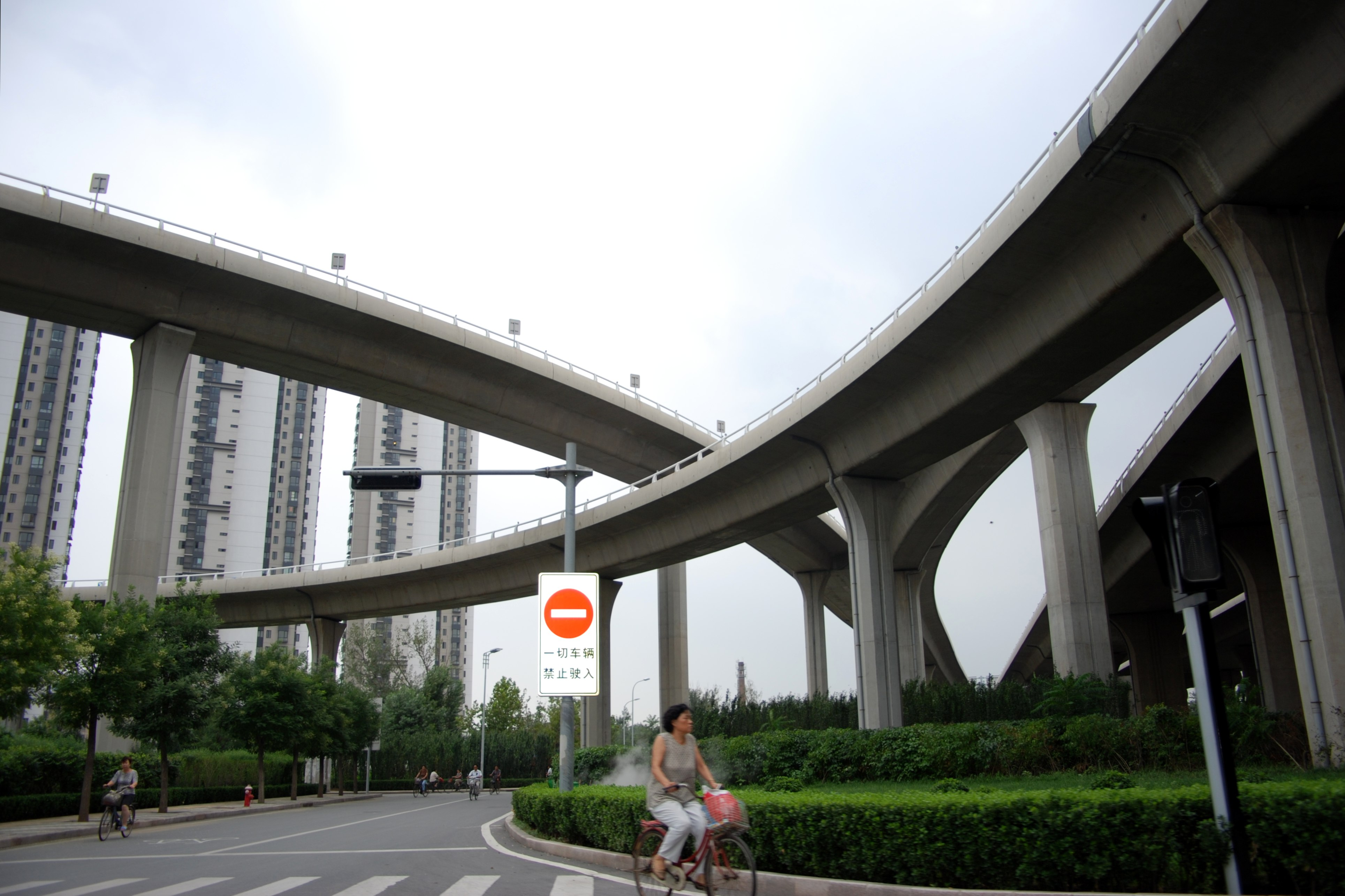
- Highway interchange at the souther corner of the subdistrict, 2009

- Location within Tianjin Location within China
- Coordinates: 39°06′08″N 117°16′14″E
- Country: China
- Municipality: Tianjin
- District: Hedong
- Village-level Divisions: 15 communities

Area
  - Total: 2.34 km^{2} (0.90 sq mi)
- Elevation: 6 m (20 ft)

Population (2010)
  - Total: 94,762
  - Density: 40,500/km^{2} (105,000/sq mi)
- Time zone: UTC+8 (China Standard)
- Postal code: 300181
- Area code: 022

Zhongshanmen Subdistrict (simplified Chinese: 中山门街道; traditional Chinese: 中山門街道; pinyin: Zhōngshānmén Jiēdào) is a subdistrict located in the southern side of Hedong District, Tianjin. it shares border Shanghang Road and Wanxing Subdistricts to the northeast, Erhaoqiao Subdistrict to the southeast, Fumin Road Subdistrict to the southwest, and Dazhigu Subdistrict to the northwest. It had a total population of 94,762 as of 2010.

Its name Zhongshanmen (Chinese: 中山门; lit. 'Middle Mountain Gate') originated in 1947, when the Nationalist government constructed a series of fortification in Tianjin during the Chinese Civil War. A huge metal gate was installed within this region, along with an inscription reading: "Zhongshanmen". Later people started to refer to the area by this name.

== History ==
Timetable of Zhongshanmen Subdistrict
Year	Status	Within
1952 - 1956	Zhongshanmen Worker's New Village	4th District, Tianjin
1956 - 1961	Zhongshanmen Subdistrict	Hedong District, Tianin
1961 - 1963	Zhongshanmen People's Commune	Hedong District, Tianin
1963 - 1966	Zhongshanmen Subdistrict	Hedong District, Tianin
1966 - 1968	Zhongshanmen Subdistrict	Dongfeng District, Tianjin
1968 - 1978	Zhongshanmenjie Revolutionary Committee (Southeastern part were made into Erhaoqiao Subdistrict in 1977)	Hedong District, Tianjin
1978–present	Zhongshanmen Subdistrict (Part of it was made into Guangning Road subdistrict in 1979, reincorporated in 2000)	Hedong District, Tianjin

== Administrative divisions ==
At the end of 2021, Zhongshanmen Subdistrict was composed of 15 communities. They are listed in the table below:

Subdivision names	Name transliterations
团结北里	Tuanjie Beili
和睦北里	Hemu Beili
和睦西里	Hemu Xili
友爱南里	You'ai Nanli
互助南里	Huzhu Nanli
互助西里	Huzhu Xili
龙潭路	Longtanlu
中山门北里	Zhongshanmen Beili
团结东里	Tuanjie Dongli
中山门东里	Zhongshanmen Dongli
丰乐里	Fengleli
试验楼	Shiyanlou
中山门四号路	Zhongshanmen Sihaolu
友爱东里	You'ai Dongli
格调竹境	Gediao Zhujing
