= Dawangzhuang Subdistrict =

Dawangzhuang Subdistrict 大王庄街道
- Subdistrict
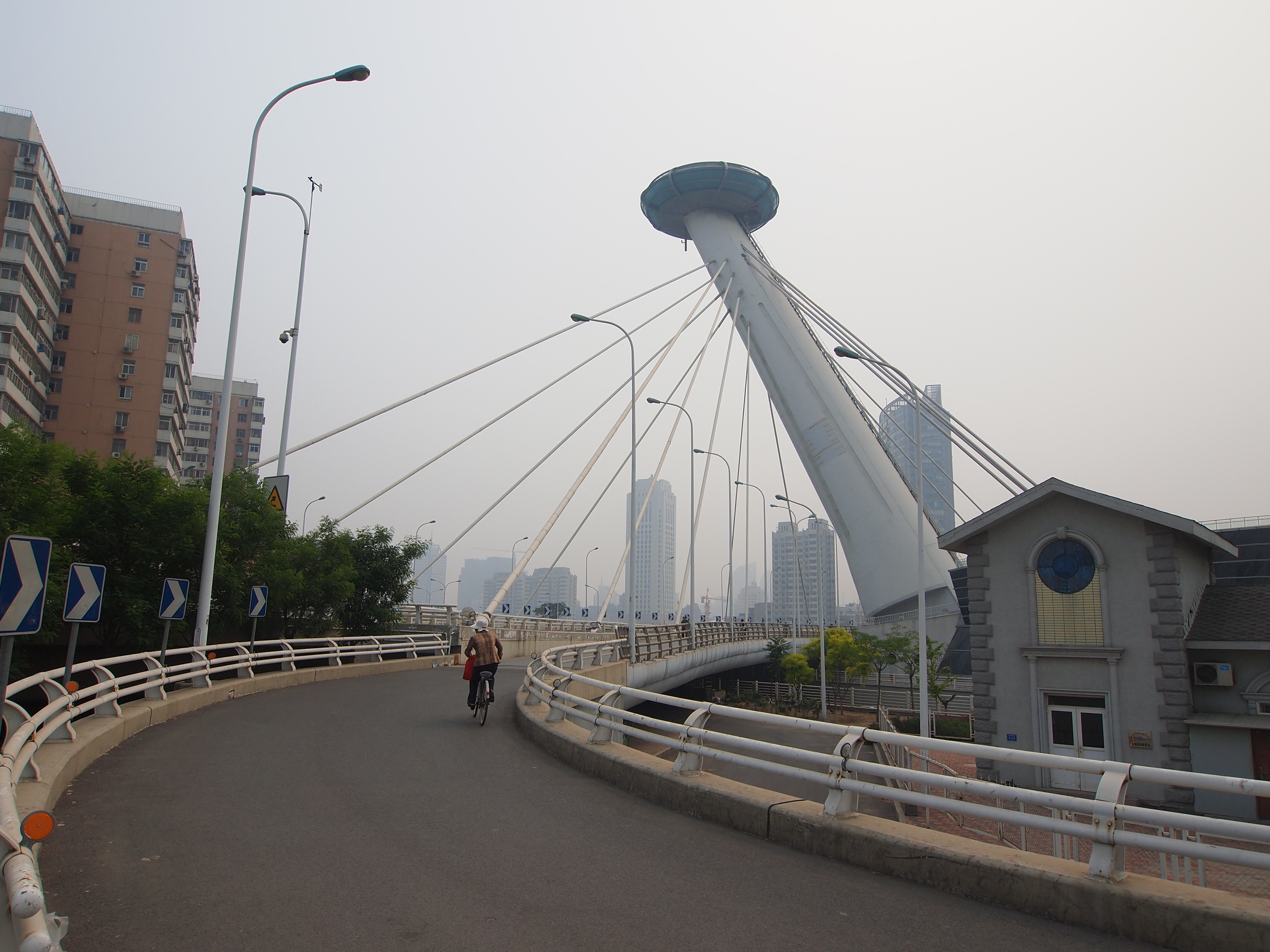
- Ligonglou Bridge on the northwest of the subdistrict, 2012

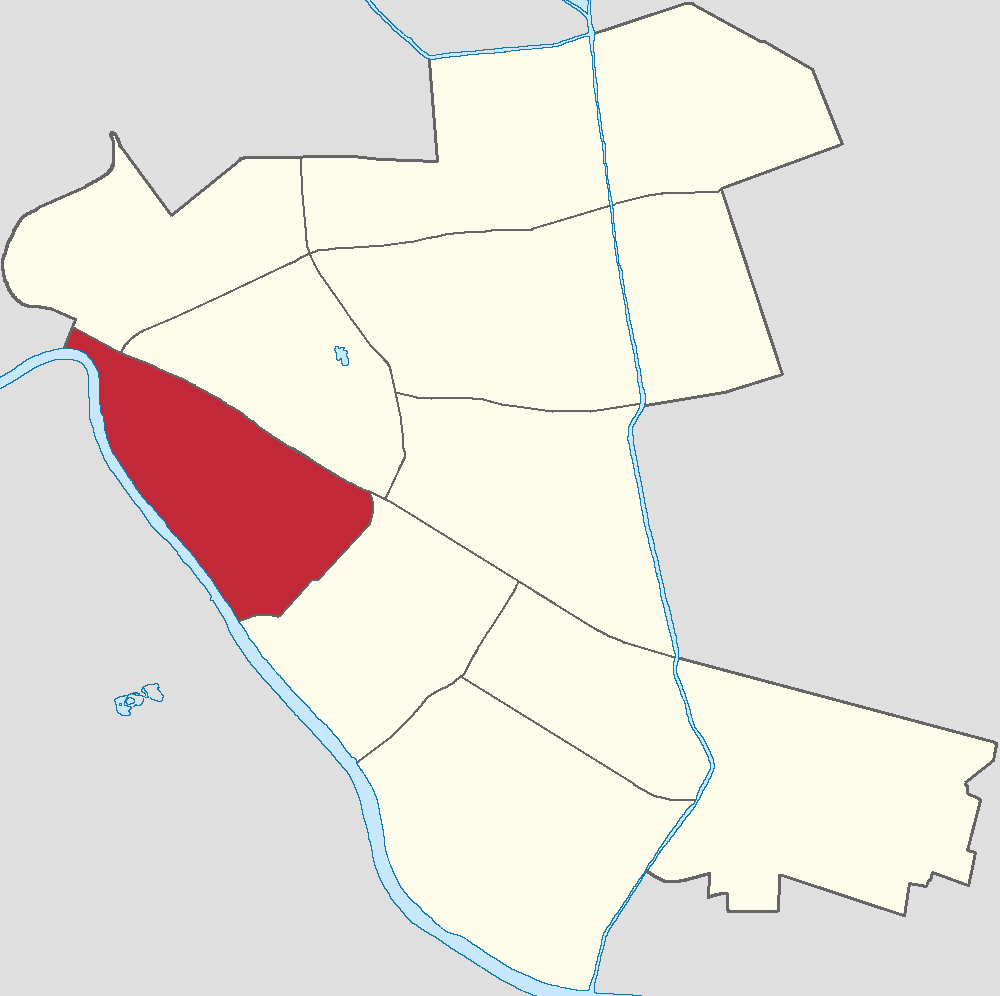
- Location in Hedong District

- Location within Tianjin Location within China
- Coordinates: 39°07′33″N 117°12′54″E
- Country: China
- Municipality: Tianjin
- District: Hedong
- Village-level Divisions: 13 communities

Area
  - Total: 3.48 km^{2} (1.34 sq mi)
- Elevation: 6 m (20 ft)

Population (2010)
  - Total: 65,614
  - Density: 18,900/km^{2} (48,800/sq mi)
- Time zone: UTC+8 (China Standard)
- Postal code: 300012
- Area code: 022

Dawangzhuang Subdistrict (simplified Chinese: 大王庄街道; traditional Chinese: 大王莊街道; pinyin: Dàwángzhuāng Jiēdào) is a subdistrict situated on the southwestern side of Hedong District, Tianjin. it shares border with Chunhua and Tangjiekou Subdistricts in its northeast, Dazhigu Subdistrict in its southeast, Xiawafang and Dayingmen Subdistricts in its south, as well as Xiaobailou and Guangfudao Subdistricts in its west. As of 2010, its total population was 65,614.

The subdistrict's name can be translated as "Great Wang's Villa".

== History ==
History of Dawangzhuang Subdistrict
Year	Status	Within
1954 - 1956	Yixinli Subdistrict Shiyijing Road Subdistrict Liuwei Road Subdistrict	4th District, Tianjin
1956 - 1958	Dawangzhuang Subdistrict Shiyijing Road Subdistrict	Hedong District, Tianjin
1958 - 1961	Dawangzhuang Subdistrict	Hedong District, Tianjin
1961 - 1963	Dawangzhuangjie People's Commune	Hedong District, Tianjin
1963 - 1966	Dawangzhuang Subdistrict Shiyijing Road Subdistrict	Hedong District, Tianjin
1966 - 1968	Dawangzhuang Subdistrict Shiyijing Road Subdistrict	Dongfeng District, Tianjin
1968 - 1978	Dawanzhuang Revolutionary Committee	Hedong District, Tianjin
1978–present	Dawangzhuang Subdistrict	Hedong District, Tianjin

== Administrative divisions ==
At the end of 2021, Dawangzhuang Subdistrict consisted of 13 communities. They are, by the order of their Administrative Division Codes:

Subdivision names	Name transliterations
诚厚里	Chenghouli
麟祥里	Linxiangli
积善里	Jishanli
新义信里	Xin Yixinli
德元里	Deyuanli
长城公寓	Changcheng Gongyu
荣泰公寓	Rongtai Gongyu
丰盈里	Fengyingli
十三经路	Shisanjing Lu
丰瑞里	Fengruili
林枫花园	Linfeng Huayuan
信和苑	Xinheyuan
祥云名轩	Xiangyun Minxuan

== Gallery ==
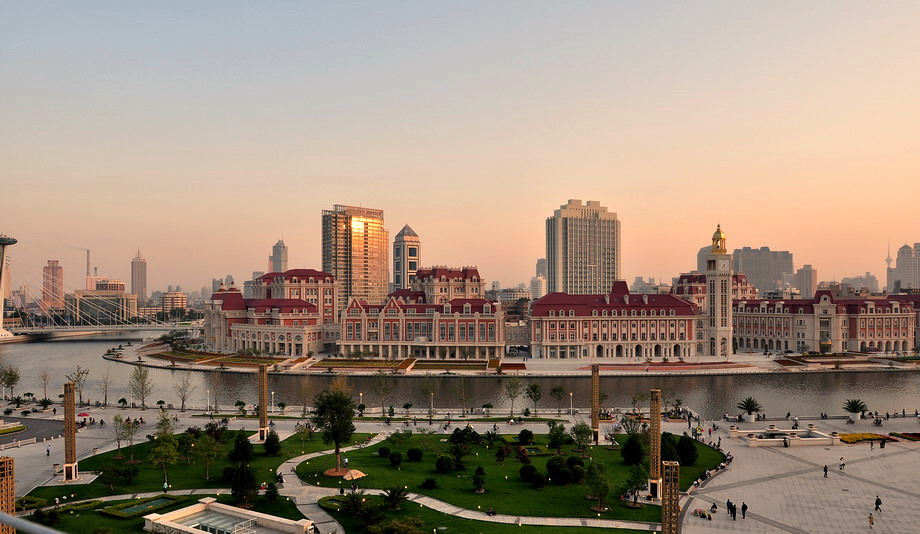
Jinwan Plaza, 2009

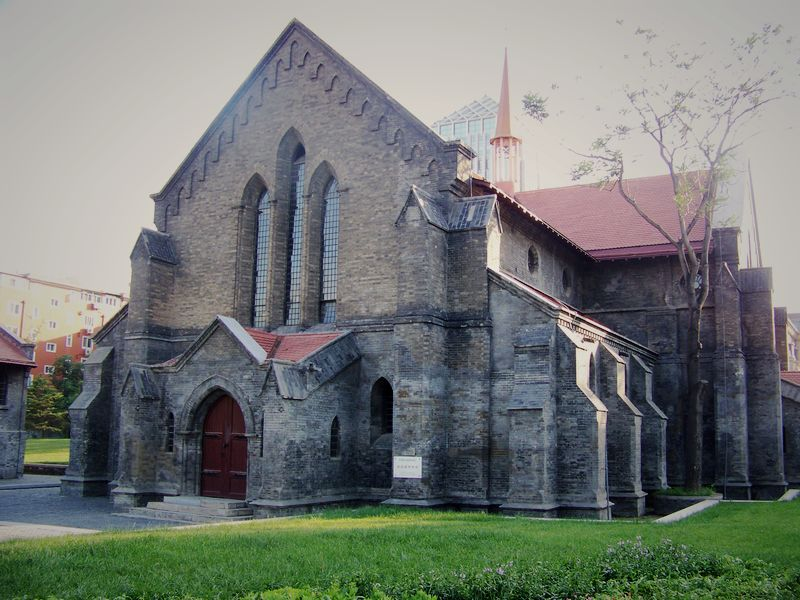
The Anglican All Saints' Church in Tianjin, 2016
