= Dazhigu Subdistrict =

Dazhigu Subdistrict 大直沽街道
- Subdistrict
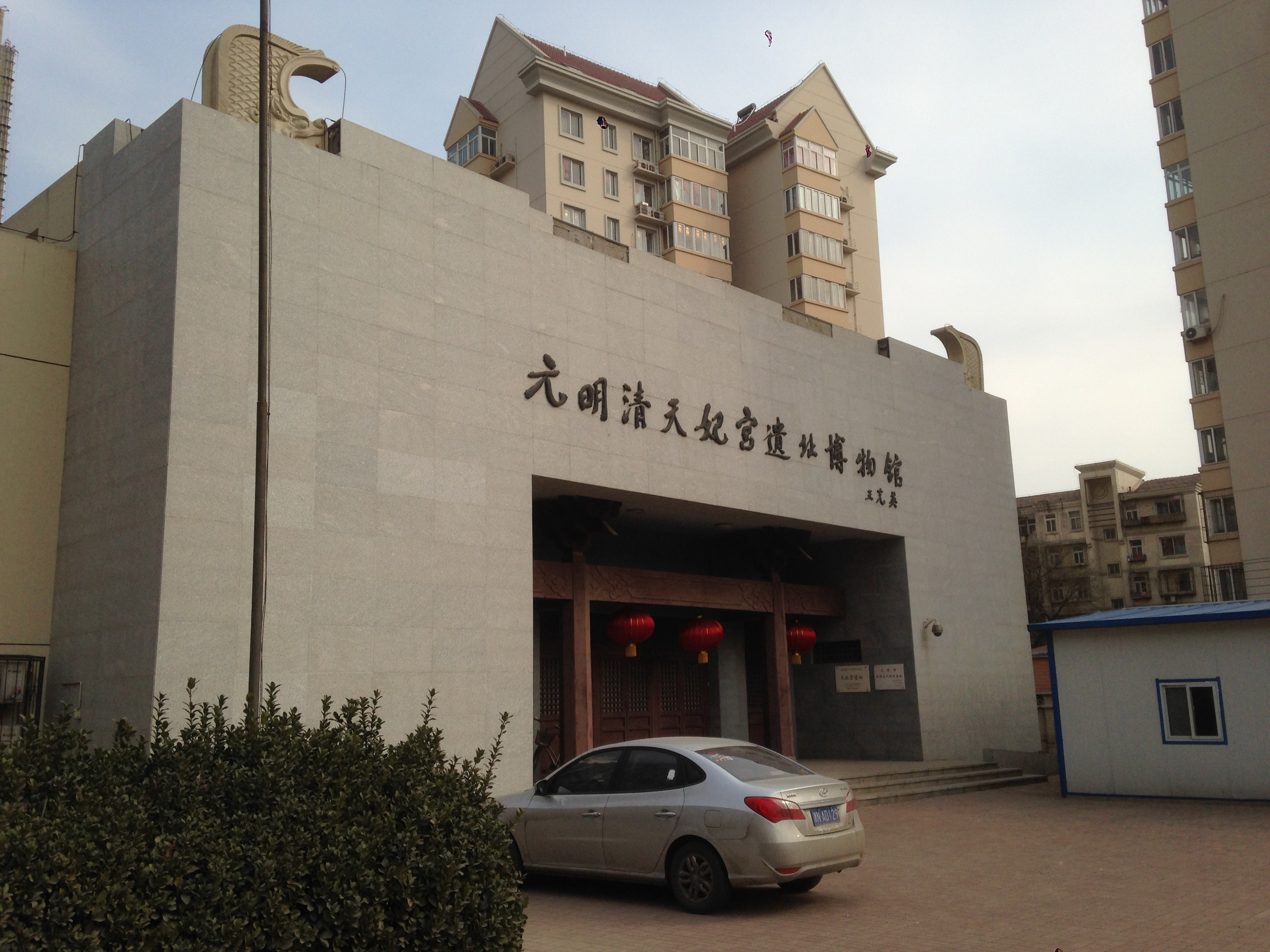
- Museum of Yuan Dynasty Qingtian Consort Palace Site within the subdistrict, 2014

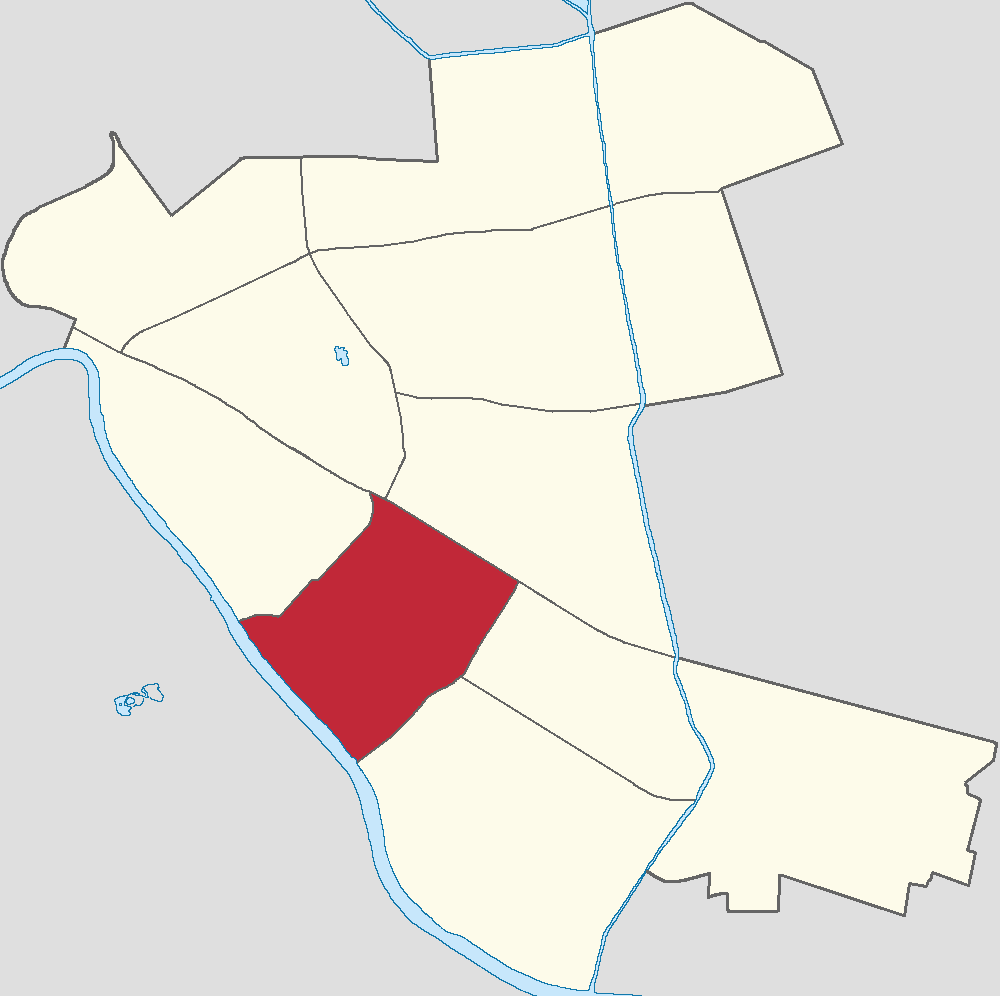
- Location in Hedong District

- Location within Tianjin Location within China
- Coordinates: 39°06′36″N 117°14′17″E
- Country: China
- Municipality: Tianjin
- District: Hedong
- Village-level Divisions: 14 communities

Area
  - Total: 3.27 km^{2} (1.26 sq mi)
- Elevation: 6 m (20 ft)

Population (2010)
  - Total: 88,860
  - Density: 27,200/km^{2} (70,400/sq mi)
- Time zone: UTC+8 (China Standard)
- Postal code: 300170
- Area code: 022

Dazhigu Subdistrict (Chinese: 大直沽街道; pinyin: Dàzhígū Jiēdào) is a subdistrict situated in the southwest edge of Hedong District, Tianjin. it borders Tangjiakou and Shanghang Road Subdistricts in the northeast, Zhongshanmen and Fumin Road Subdistricts in the southeast, as well as Guajiasi and Xiawafang Subdistricts in the south. In 2010, it had a census population of 88,860.

Its name is taken from Zhigu, the name of Tianjin during the Yuan dynasty.

== History ==
History of Dazhigu Subdistrict
Year	Status	Within
1954–1956	Dazhigu Subdistrict (Incorporated part of Xiaosunzhuang Subdistrict in 1956, and part of Jintang Road Subdistrict in 1958)	4th District, Tianjin
1956–1966	Dazhigu Subdistrict (Incorporated part of Xiaosunzhuang Subdistrict in 1956, and part of Jintang Road Subdistrict in 1958)	Hedong District, Tianjin
1966–1968	Dazhigu Subdistrict (Incorporated part of Xiaosunzhuang Subdistrict in 1956, and part of Jintang Road Subdistrict in 1958)	Dongfeng District, Tianjin
1968–1978	Dazhigu Revolutionary Committee	Hedong District, Tianjin
1978–present	Dazhigu Subdistrict	Hedong District, Tianjin

== Administrative divisions ==
By 2021, Dazhigu Subdistrict was subdivided into these 14 communities:

Subdivision names	Name transliterations
文华里	Wenhuali
和进里	Hejinli
津塘村	Jintangcun
大直沽后台	Dazhigu Houtai
汇贤里	Huixianli
荣兴温泉公寓	Rongxin Wenquan Gongyu
福泽温泉公寓	Fuze Wenquan Gongyu
宫前园	Gongqianyuan
东宿舍	Dongsushe
蝶桥公寓	Dieqiao Gongyu
神州花园	Shenzhou Huayuan
直沽园	Zhiguyuan
萦东温泉花园	Yingdong Wenquan Huayuan
靓锦名居	Liangjin Mingju
