= Ningyuan Subdistrict =

Ningyuan Subdistrict 宁园街道
- Subdistrict
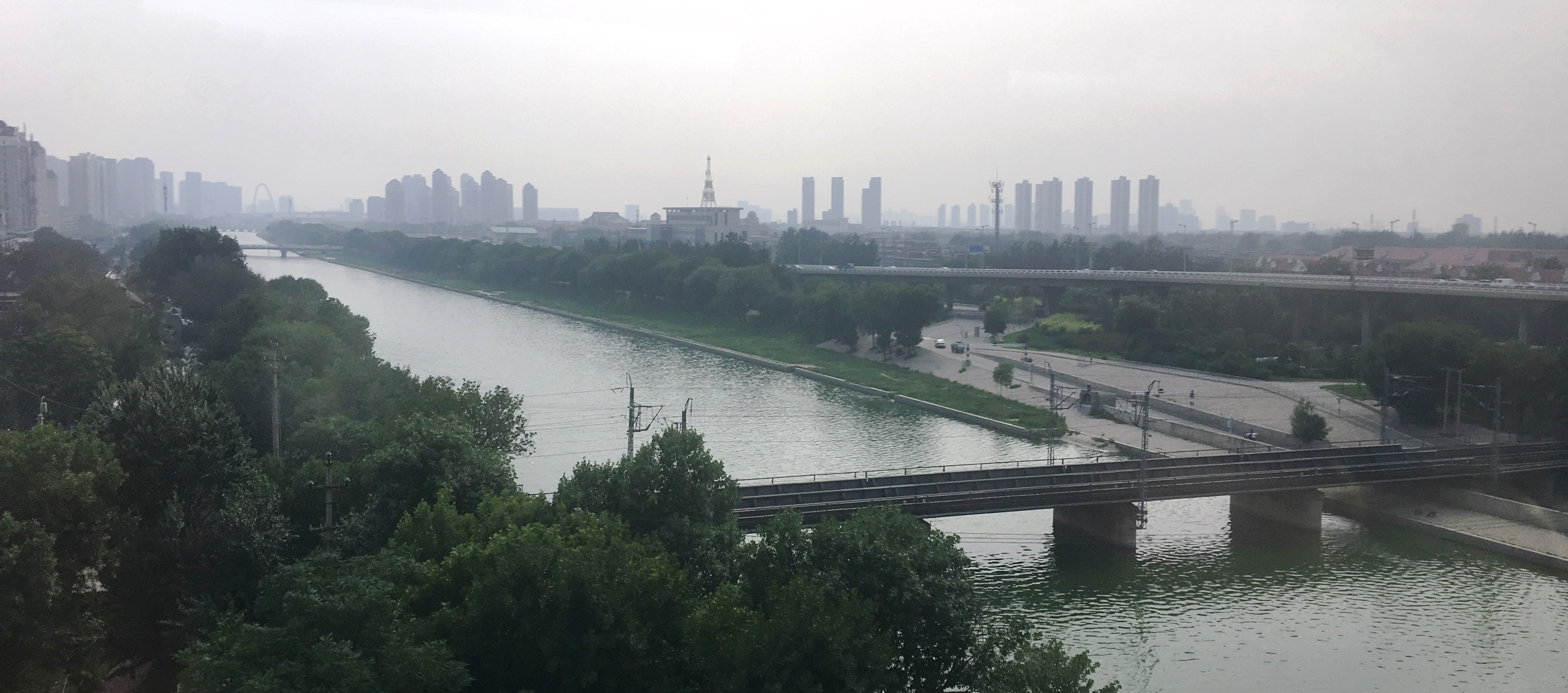
- Section of Xinkai River near the subdistrict, 2017

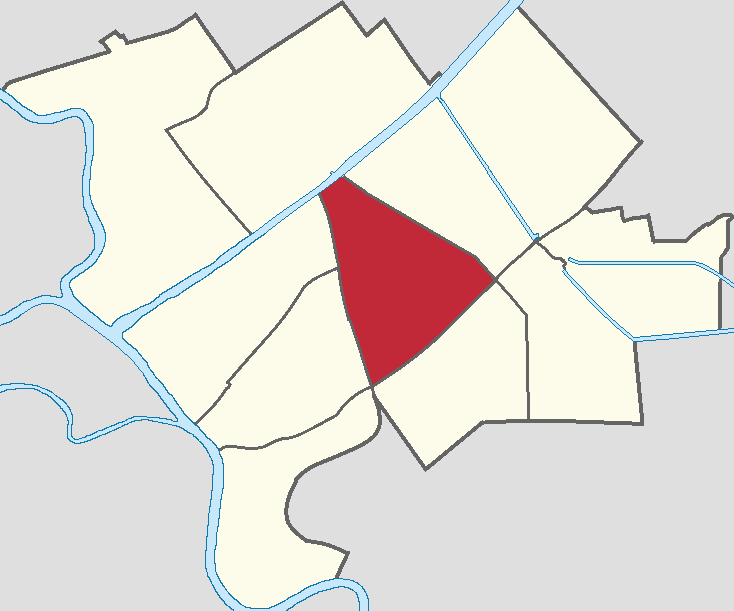
- Location of Ningyuan Subdistrict in Hebei District

- Location within Tianjin Location within China
- Coordinates: 39°09′38″N 117°12′45″E
- Country: China
- Municipality: Tianjin
- District: Hebei
- Village-level Divisions: 6 communities

Area
  - Total: 2.38 km^{2} (0.92 sq mi)
- Elevation: 7 m (23 ft)

Population (2010)
  - Total: 47,253
  - Density: 19,900/km^{2} (51,400/sq mi)
- Time zone: UTC+8 (China Standard)
- Postal code: 300241
- Area code: 022

Ningyuan Subdistrict (simplified Chinese: 宁园街道; traditional Chinese: 寧園街道; pinyin: Níngyuán Jiēdào) is a subdistrict located in the center of Hebei District, Tianjin, China. It borders Tiedong Road Subdistrict in the northwest, Jianchang Avenue Subdistrict in the northeast, Wangchuanchang Subdistrict in the southeast, as well as Wanghailou and Hongshunli Subdistricts in the southwest. The census counted 47,253 residents for this subdistrict in 2010.

The subdistrict was established in 1954. Its name Ningyuan (Chinese: 宁园; lit. 'Tranquil Park') is referring to Beining Park that was first founded here in 1931.

== Geography ==
Ningyuan subdistrict is on the southeast of Xinkai River.

== Administrative divisions ==
The list below contains the 6 residential communities under Ningyuan Subdistrict so far in 2021:

Subdivision names	Name transliterations
润园里	Runyuanli
赛园里	Saiyuanli
珍园里	Zhenyuanli
汇园里	Huiyuanli
富方园	Fufangyuan
爱家	Aijia

== Gallery ==
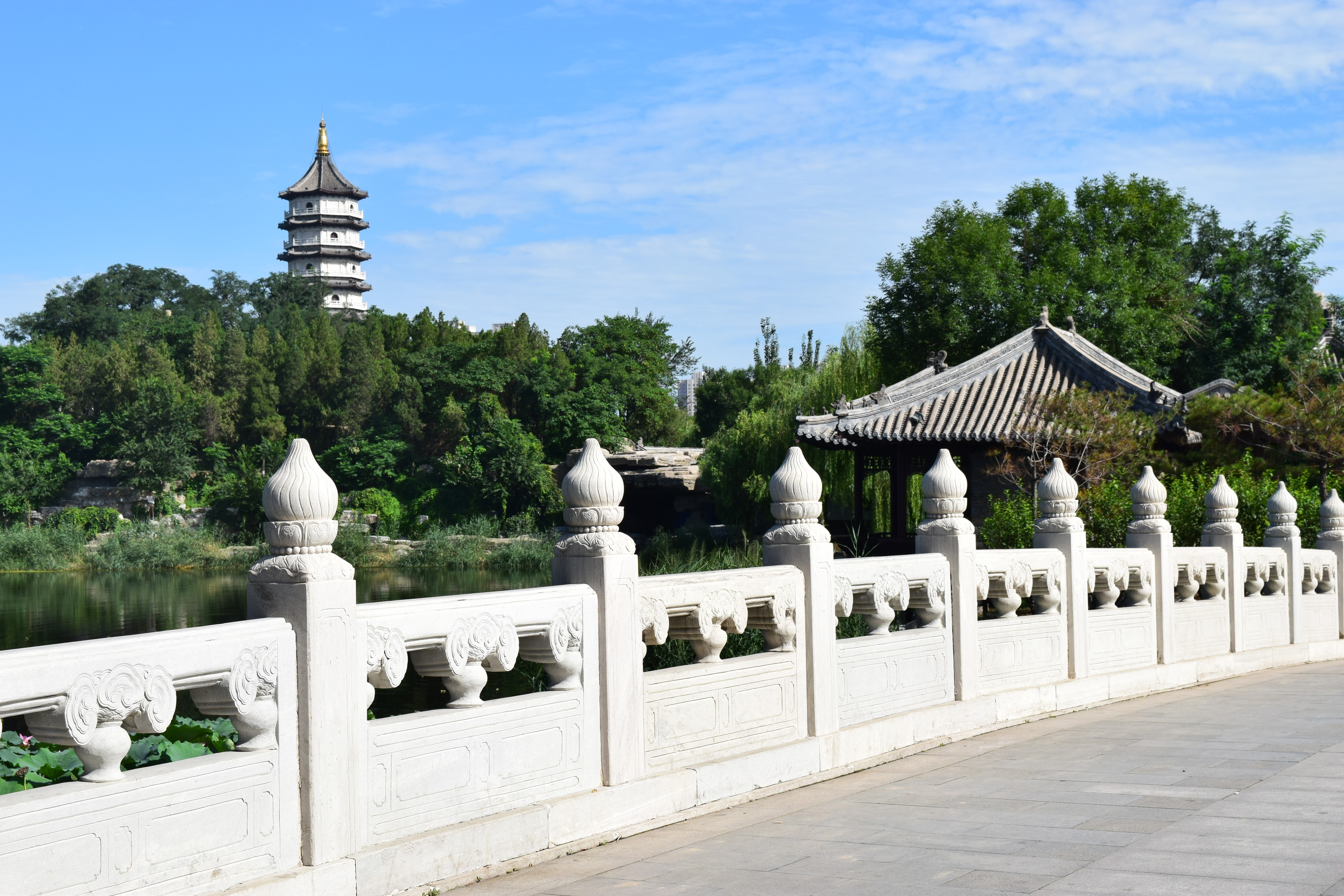
Beining Park on the northeastern side of the subdistrict, 2016

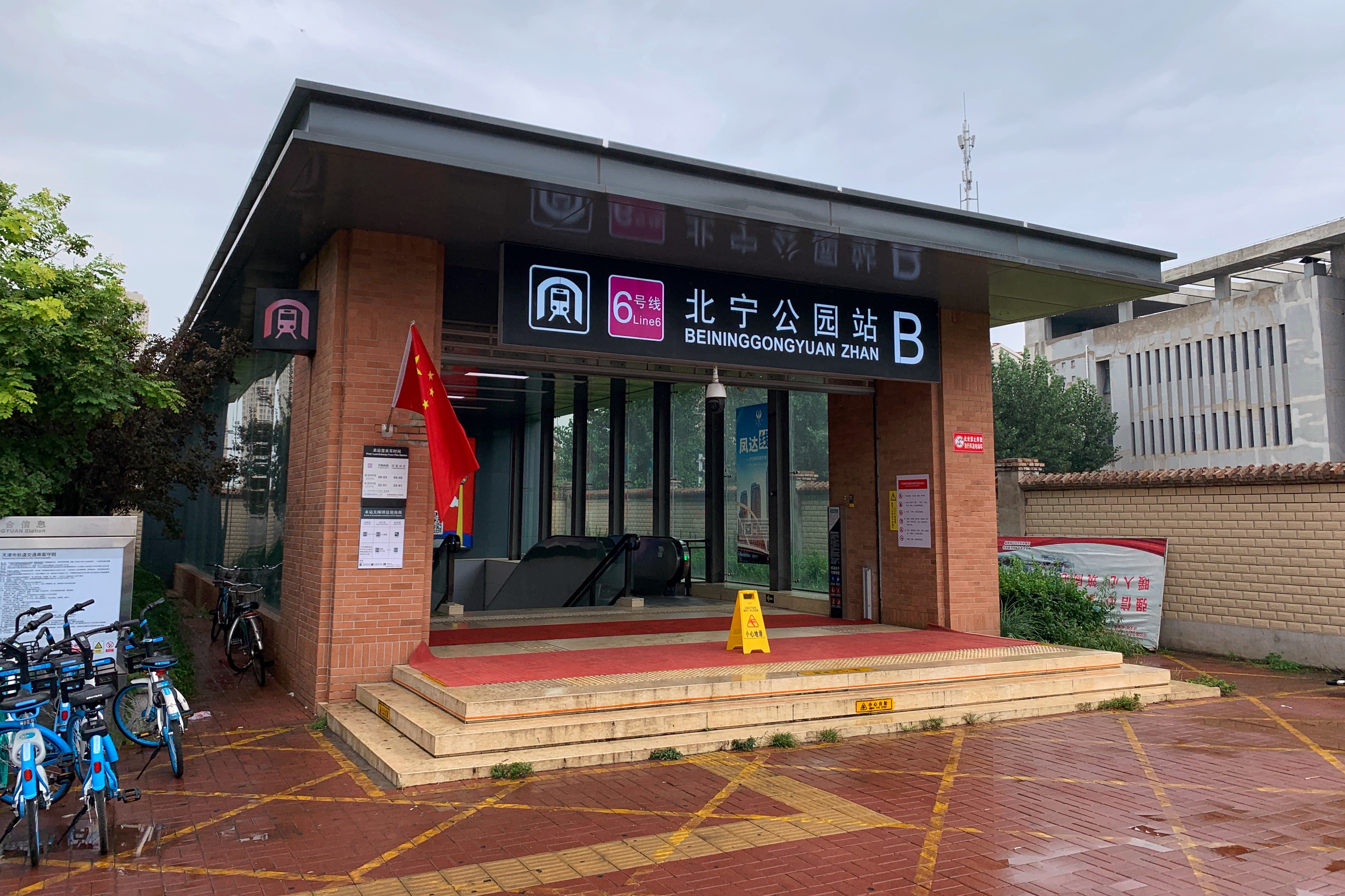
Beining Gongyuan Station of Tianjin Subway, 2021
