= Yueyahe Subdistrict =

Yueyahe Subdistrict 月牙河街道
- Subdistrict
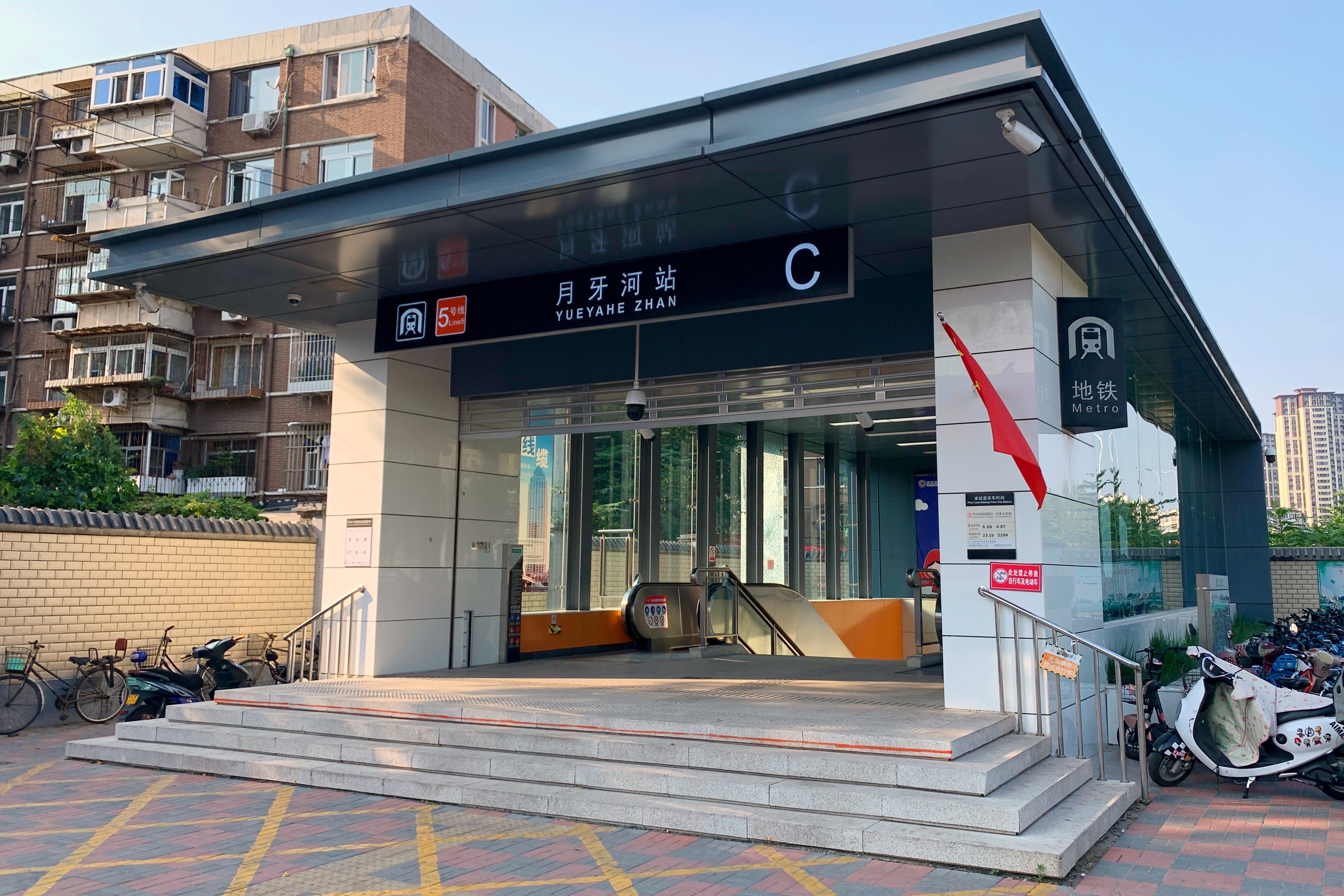
- Yueyahe Station of Tianjin Subway, 2021

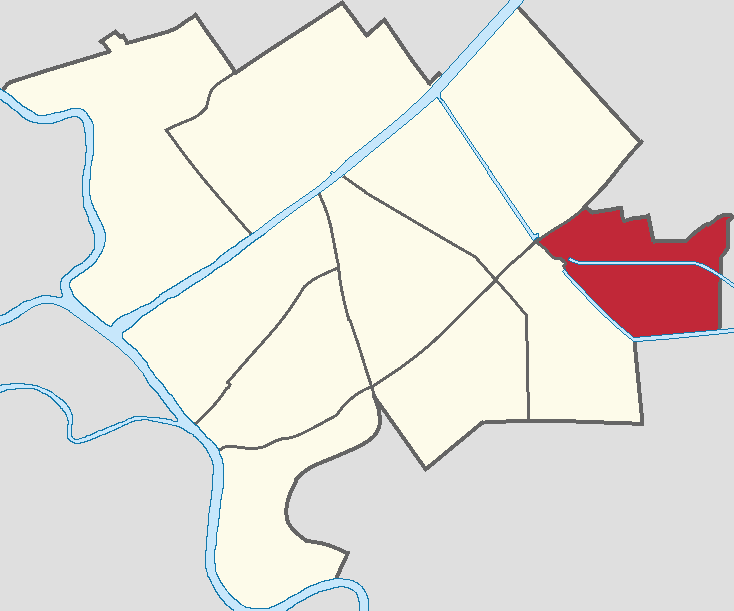
- Location of Yueyahe Subdistrict in Hebei District

- Location within Tianjin Location within China
- Coordinates: 39°09′36″N 117°14′59″E
- Country: China
- Municipality: Tianjin
- District: Hebei
- Village-level Divisions: 13 communities

Area
  - Total: 2.06 km^{2} (0.80 sq mi)
- Elevation: 6 m (20 ft)

Population (2010)
  - Total: 85,564
  - Density: 41,500/km^{2} (108,000/sq mi)
- Time zone: UTC+8 (China Standard)
- Postal code: 300250
- Area code: 022

Yueyahe Subdistrict (Chinese: 月牙河街道; pinyin: Yuèyáhé Jiēdào) is a subdistrict situated within Hebei District, Tianjin, China. It borders Jianchang Avenue and Jinzhong Subdistricts to its north, Huaming Subdistrict to its east, Changzhou Avenue Subdistrict to its south, and Jiangdu Road Subdistrict to its west. According to the 2010 census, the subdistrict's population was 85,564.

The subdistrict was named after Yueya (Chinese: 月牙; lit. 'Crescent Moon') River that runs through the region.

== History ==
Timeline of Yueyahe Subdistrict
Year	Status	Within
1953 - 1958		Dongjiao District, Tianjin
1958 - 1964		Hebei District, Tianjin
1964 - 1985	Dabizhuang Township	Dongjiao District, Tianjin
1985 - 1989	Dabizhuang Township; Jingjiang Road Subdistrict	
1989 - 2000	Dajiang Road Subdistrict; Jingjiang Road Subdistrict	
2000–present	Yueyahe Subdistrict	Hebei District, Tianjin

== Administrative divisions ==
In 2021, Yueyahe Subdistrict was divided into 13 residential communities. They are listed in the table below:

Subdivision names	Name transliterations
靖江西里	Jingjiang Xili
靖江东里	Jingjiang Dongli
涪江北里	Fujiang Beili
开江南里	Kaijiang Nanli
满江里	Manjiangli
大江里	Dajiangli
锦江北里	Jinjiang Beili
金沙江里	Jinshajiangli
月牙河北里	Yueyahe Beili
环江里	Huanjiangli
丹江里	Danjiangli
琴江公寓	Qinjiang Gongyu
泉江里	Quanjiangli
