= Wangchuanchang Subdistrict =

Wangchuanchang Subdistrict 王串场街道
- Subdistrict
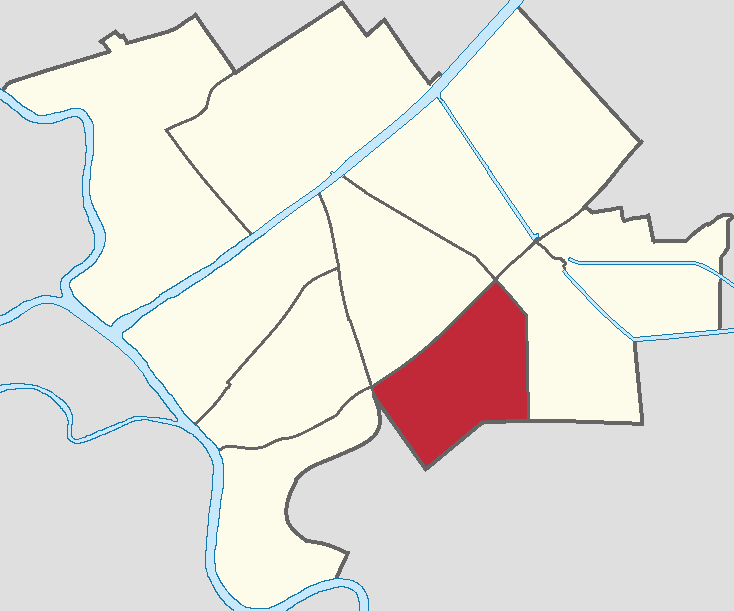
- Location of Wangchuanchang Subdistrict in Hebei District

- Location within Tianjin Location within China
- Coordinates: 39°09′02″N 117°12′46″E
- Country: China
- Municipality: Tianjin
- District: Hebei
- Village-level Divisions: 14 communities

Area
  - Total: 2.14 km^{2} (0.83 sq mi)
- Elevation: 7 m (23 ft)

Population (2010)
  - Total: 114,109
  - Density: 53,300/km^{2} (138,000/sq mi)
- Time zone: UTC+8 (China Standard)
- Postal code: 300150
- Area code: 022

Wangchuanchang Subdistrict (simplified Chinese: 王串场街道; traditional Chinese: 王串場街道; pinyin: Wángchuànchǎng Jiēdào) is a subdistrict in southern Hebei District, Tianjin, China. It borders Ningyuan Subdistrict in its northwest, Jiangdu Road Subdistrict in its northeast, Chunhua Subdistrict in its south, and Guangfu Avenue Subdistrict in its southwest. It was home to 114,109 inhabitants as of 2010.

The subdistrict was created 1954.

== Administrative divisions ==
At the end of 2021, Wangchuanchang Subdistrict consisted of 14 residential communities. they are listed as follows:

Subdivision names	Name transliterations
宇翠里	Yucuili
真诚里	Zhenchengli
迎福里	Yingfuli
艳泉里	Yanquanli
水明里	Shuimingli
秀茵明居	Xiuyin Mingju
华屏里	Huapingli
屏花里	Pinghuali
萃华里	Cuihuali
盛宇里	Shengyuli
环盛里	Huanshengli
容彩里	Rongcaili
开城里	Kaichengli
焕玉里	Huanyuli
