= Jiangdu Road Subdistrict =

Jiangdu Road Subdistrict 江都路街道
- Subdistrict
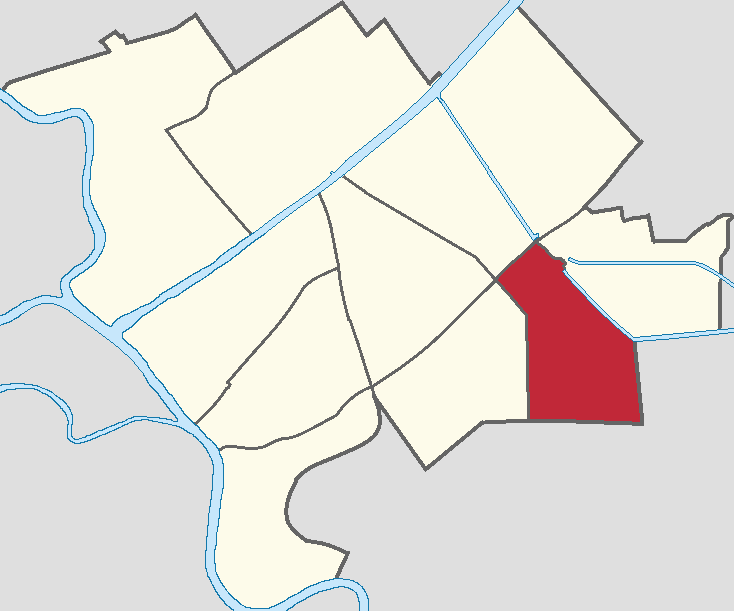
- Location in Hebei District

- Location within Tianjin Location within China
- Coordinates: 39°09′22″N 117°14′18″E
- Country: China
- Municipality: Tianjin
- District: Hebei
- Village-level Divisions: 8 communities

Area
  - Total: 2.02 km^{2} (0.78 sq mi)
- Elevation: 6 m (20 ft)

Population (2010)
  - Total: 30,036
  - Density: 14,900/km^{2} (38,500/sq mi)
- Time zone: UTC+8 (China Standard)
- Postal code: 300251
- Area code: 022

Jiangdu Road Subdistrict (Chinese: 江都路街道; pinyin: Jiāngdūlù Jiēdào) is a subdistrict inside of Hebei District, Tianjin, China. It shares border with Jianchang Avenue Subdistrict in the north, Yueyahe Subdistrict in the east, Changzhou Avenue Subdistrict in the south, and Wangchuanchang Subdistrict in the west. In 2010, it had a total population of 60,561.

The subdistrict was created as Bahao Road Subdistrict in 1981. In 1983 It was named after Jiangdu (Chinese: 江都; lit. 'River capital') Road within the region.

== Geography ==
Jiangdu Road Subdistrict is on the south of Beitang Drainage River.

== Administrative divisions ==
At the time of writing, Jiangdu Road Subdistrict covers 8 residential communities, all of which are listed below:

Subdivision names	Name transliterations
廉江里	Lianjiangli
如皋里	Rugaoli
乐山里	Leshanli
衡山里	Hengshanli
靖江里	Jingjiangli
汇光里	Huiguangli
通达新苑	Tongda Xinyuan
隆达新苑	Longda Xinyuan
