= Xinkaihe Subdistrict =

Xinkaihe Subdistrict 新开河街道
- Subdistrict
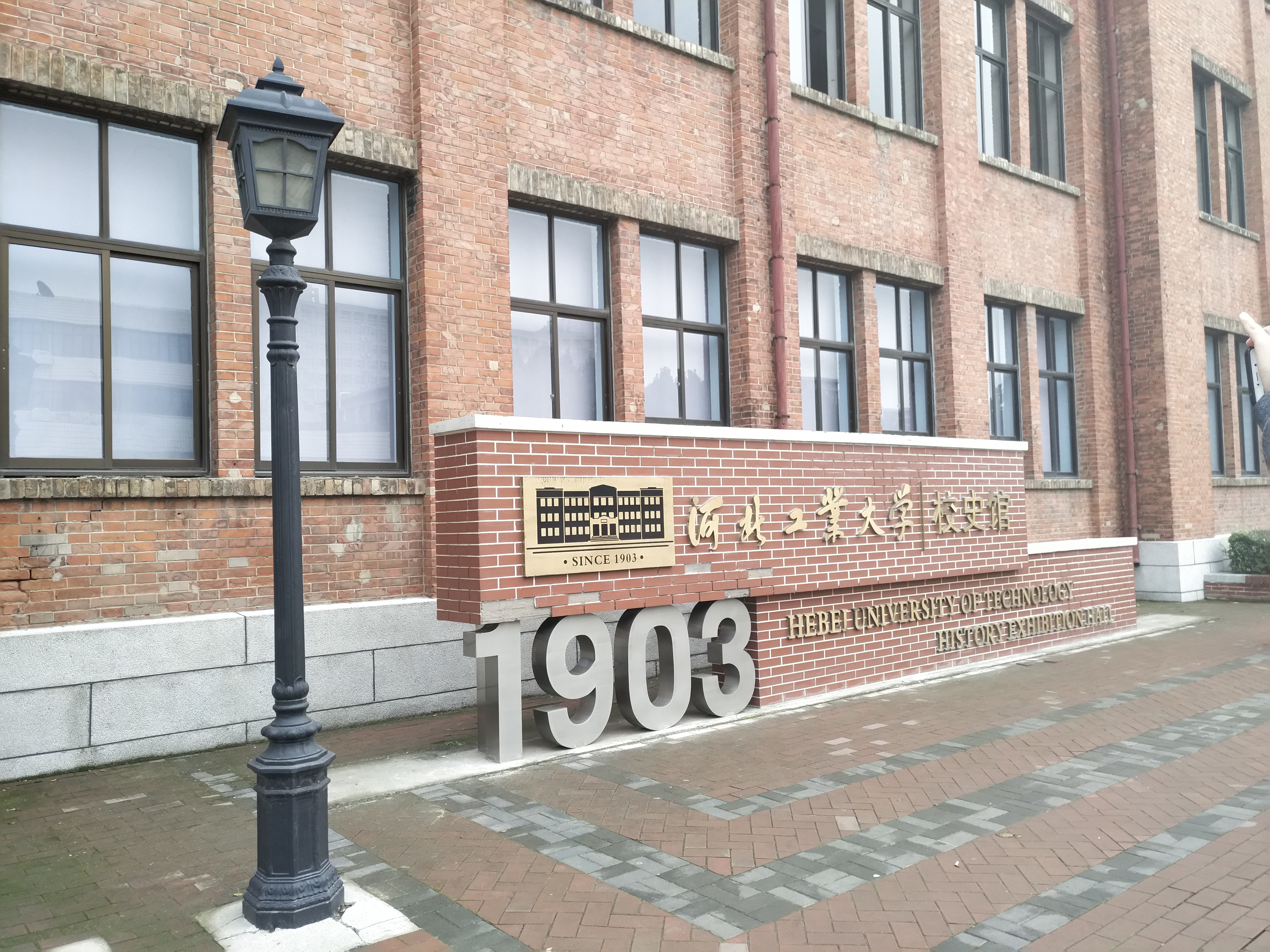
- Hebei University of Technology within the subdistrict, 2017

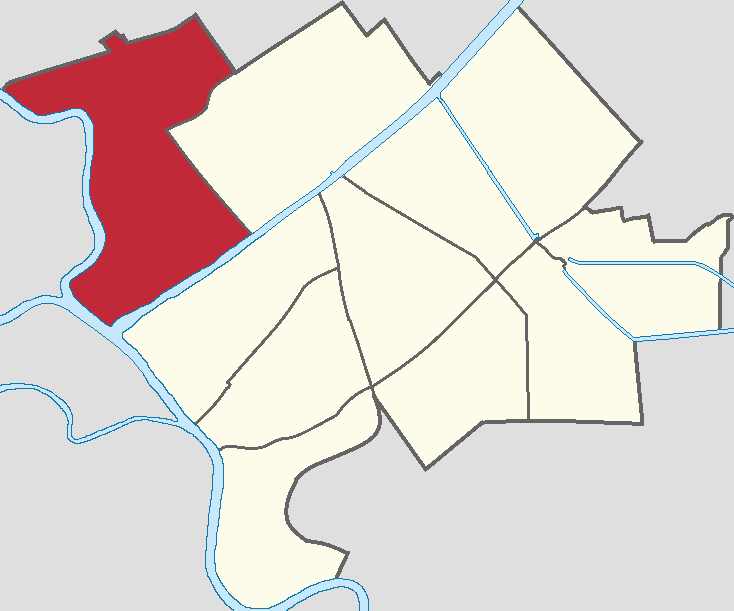
- Location in Hebei District

- Location within Tianjin Location within China
- Coordinates: 39°10′28″N 117°10′40″E
- Country: China
- Municipality: Tianjin
- District: Hebei
- Village-level Divisions: 17 communities

Area
  - Total: 4.69 km^{2} (1.81 sq mi)
- Elevation: 7 m (23 ft)

Population (2010)
  - Total: 82,661
  - Density: 17,600/km^{2} (45,600/sq mi)
- Time zone: UTC+8 (China Standard)
- Postal code: 300230
- Area code: 022

Xinkaihe Subdistrict (simplified Chinese: 新开河街道; traditional Chinese: 新開河街道; pinyin: Xīnkāihé Jiēdào) is a subdistrict located on northwestern Hebei District, Tianjin, China. It is situated to the southeast of Tianmu Town, southwest of Tiedong Road Subdistrict, north of Hongshunli and Santiaoshi Subdistricts, and east of Xigu and Dingzigu Subdistricts. It was home to 82,661 as of 2010.

The subdistrict was named after Xinkai (Chinese: 新开; lit. 'New Open') River that is located on its southeast.

== Administrative divisions ==
At the end of 2021, Xinkaihe Subdistrict consisted of 17 residential communities. They are listed in the following table:

Subdivision names	Name transliterations
天泰	Tiantai
东华里	Donghuali
东昌里	Dongchangli
裕泰园	Yutaiyuan
盛华嘉园	Shenghua Jiayuan
隆成家园	Longcheng Jiayuan
华泰园	Huataiyuan
福嘉园	Fujiayuan
盛雅佳苑	Shengya Jiayuan
宝祥园	Baoxiangyuan
芳草园	Fangcaoyuan
东海花园	Donghai Huayuan
盛和家园	Shenghe Jiayuan
盛泰嘉园	Shengtai Jiayuan
泰来嘉园	Tailai Jiayuan
汇恒园	Huiheng Yuan
盛宁家园	Shengning Jiayuan
