= Hebei, Tianjin =

Hebei 河北区
- District
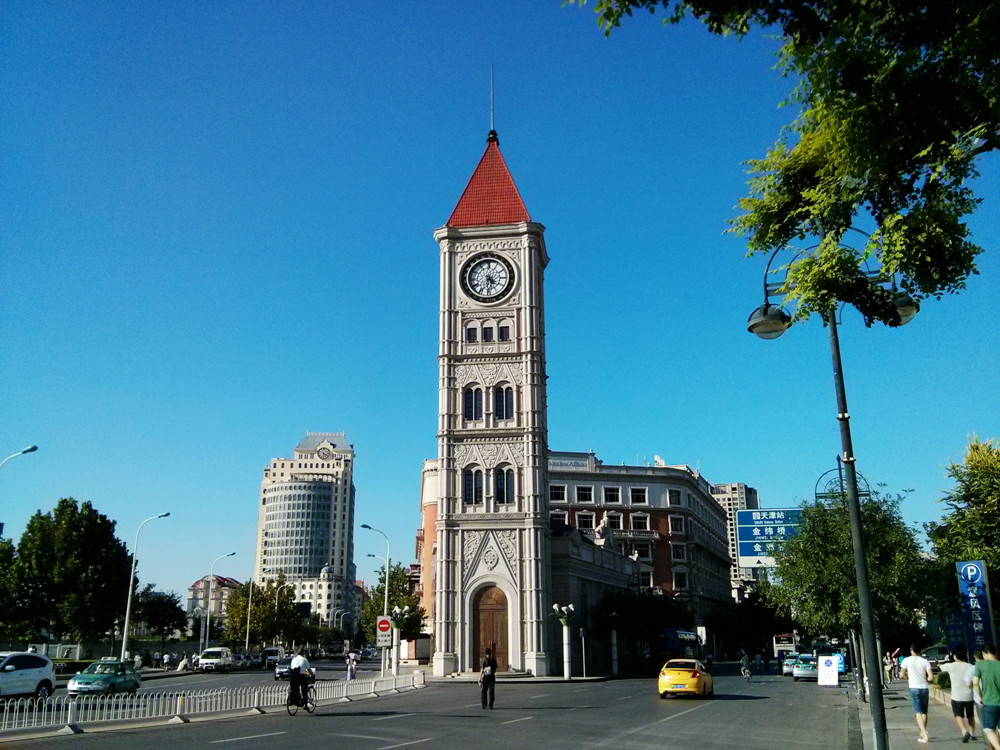
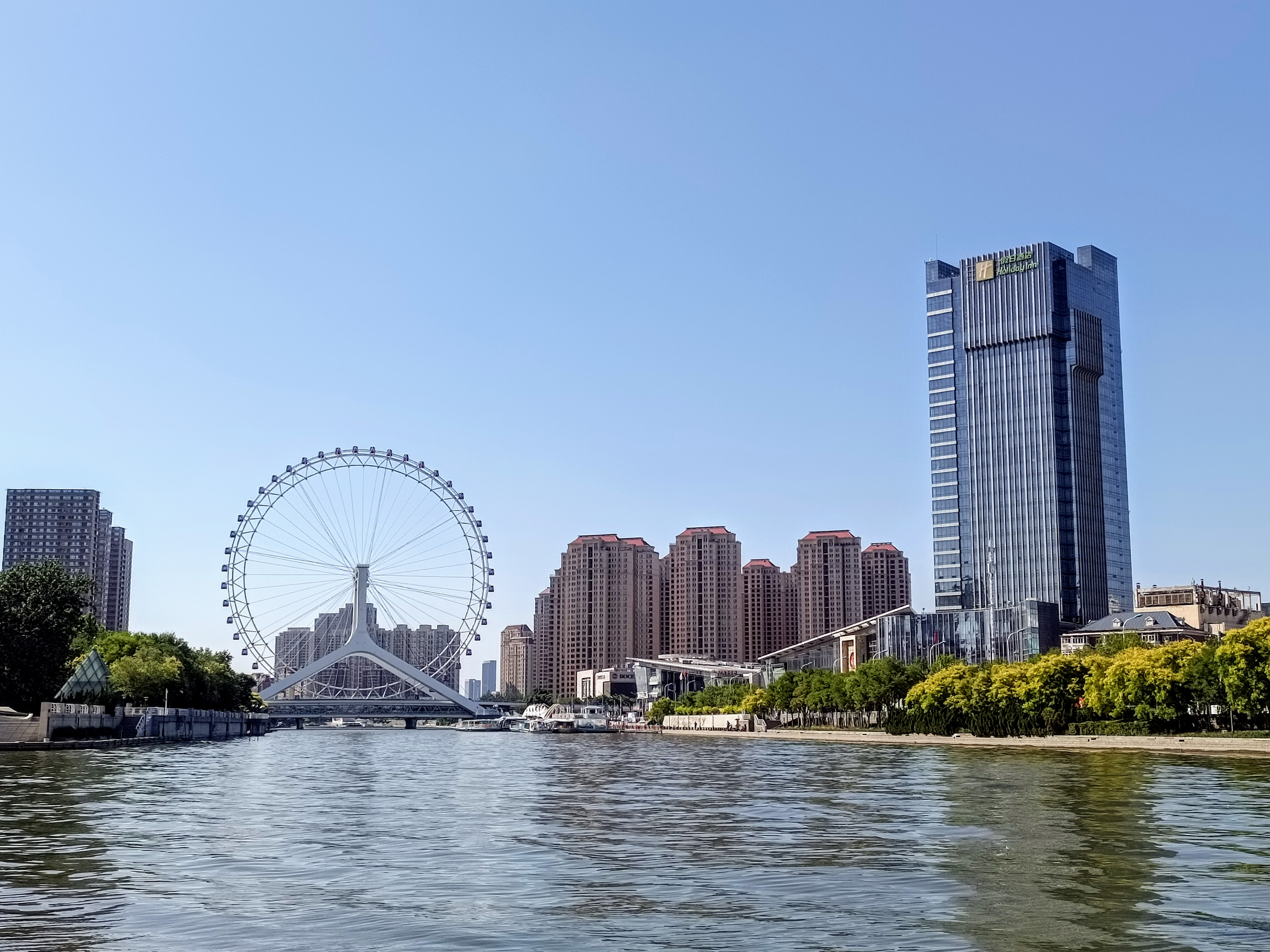
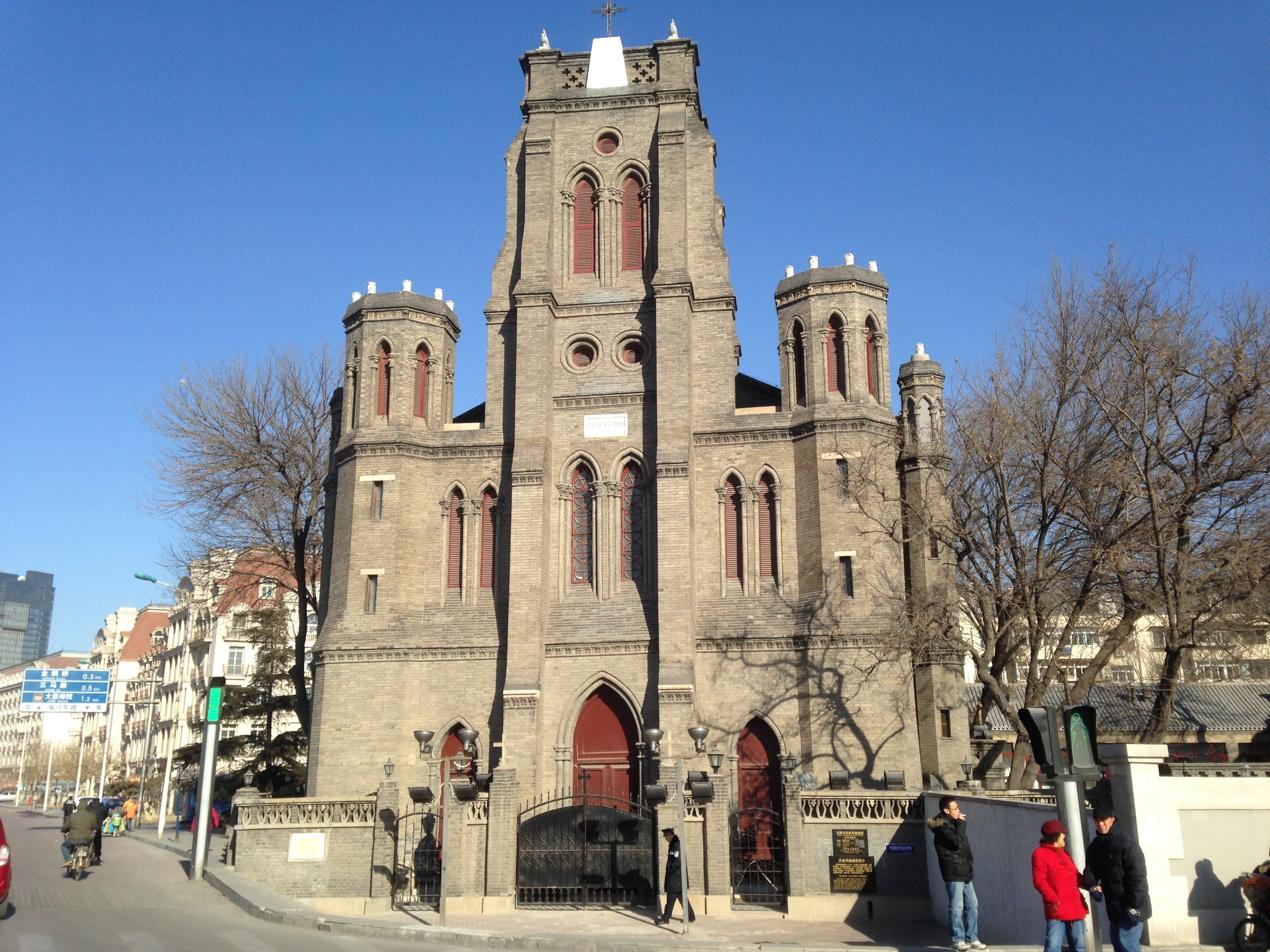
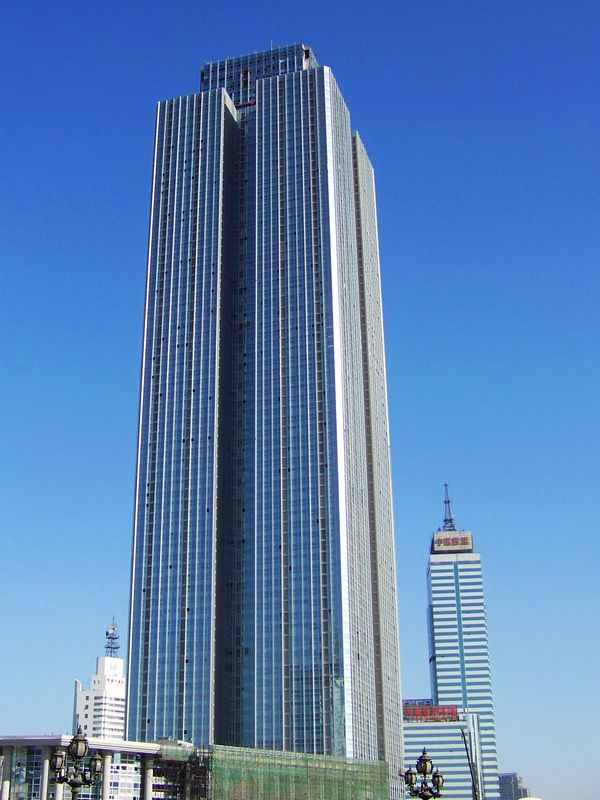
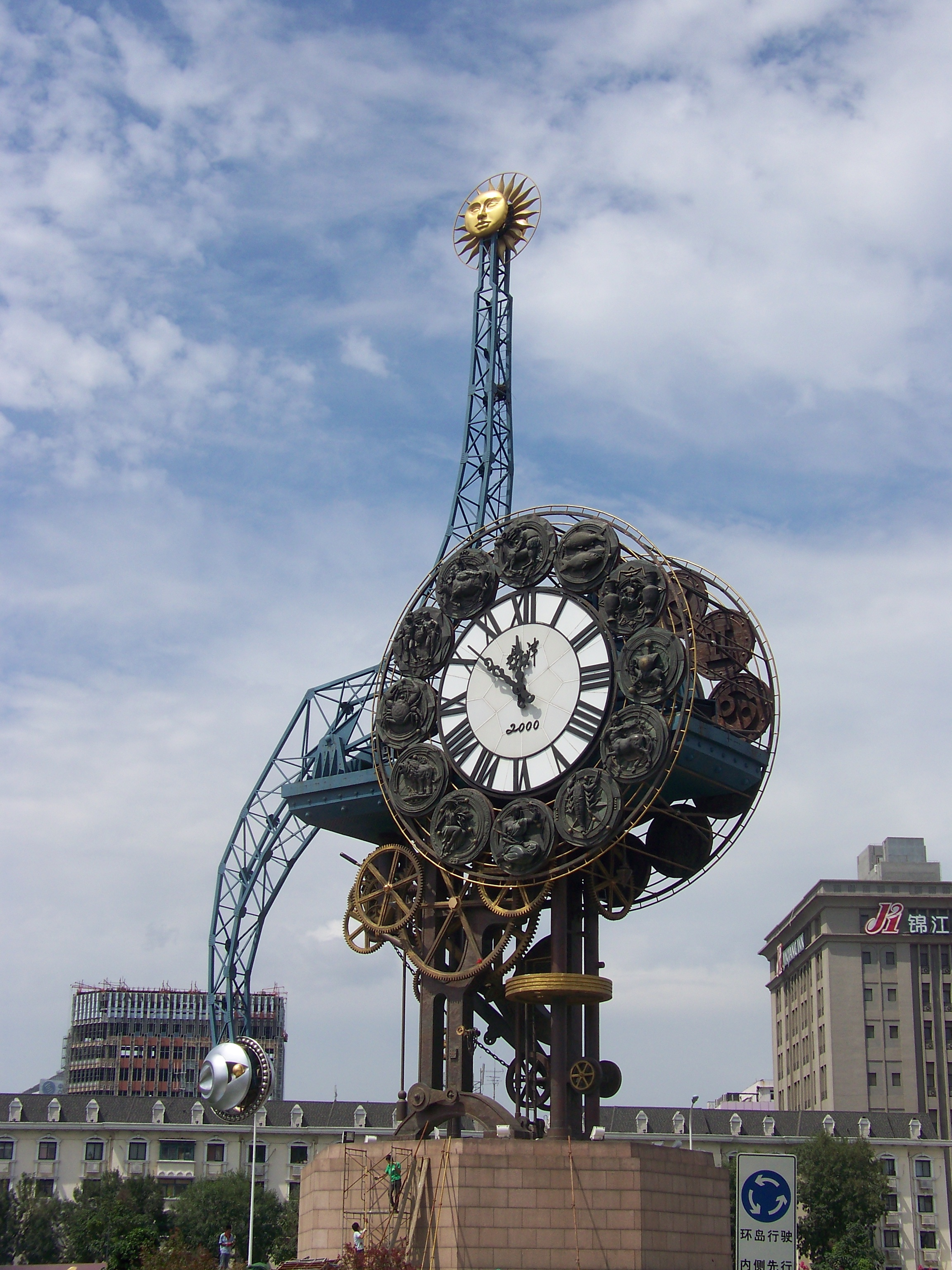
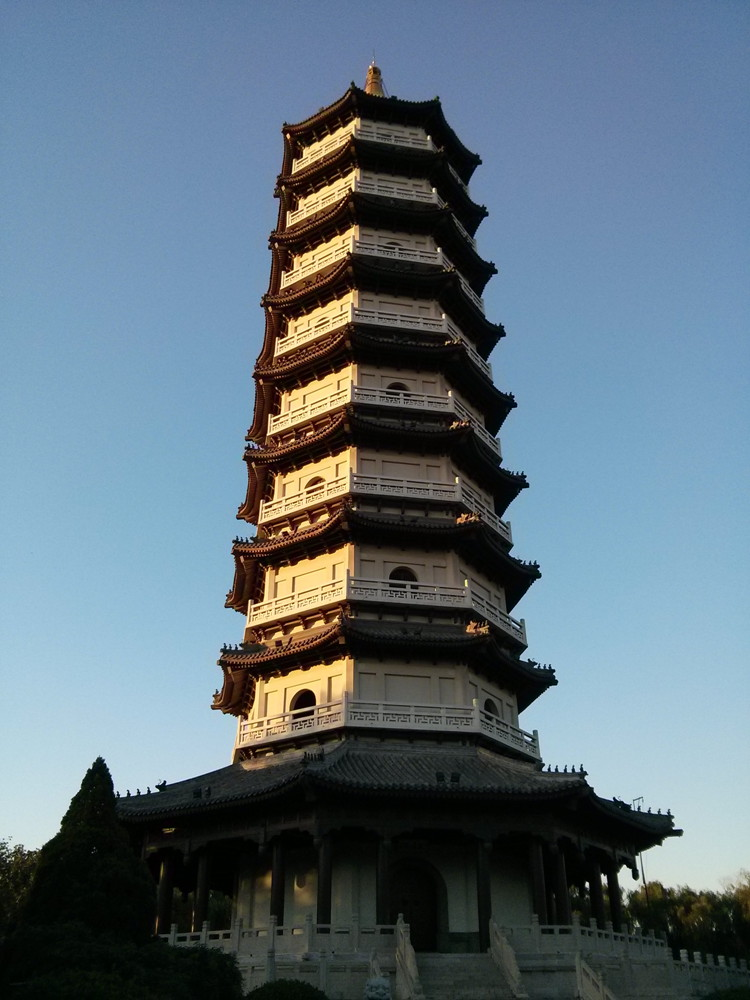
- Interactive map of Hebei
- Coordinates: 39°08′52″N 117°11′48″E
- Country: People's Republic of China
- Municipality: Tianjin
- Township-level divisions: 10 subdistricts

Area
  - Total: 29.14 km^{2} (11.25 sq mi)
- Elevation: 14 m (46 ft)

Population (2020 census)
  - Total: 647,702
  - Density: 22,230/km^{2} (57,570/sq mi)
- Time zone: UTC+8 (China Standard)
- Postal code: 300143
- Area code: 0022
Tianjin district map
Subdivisions of Tianjin
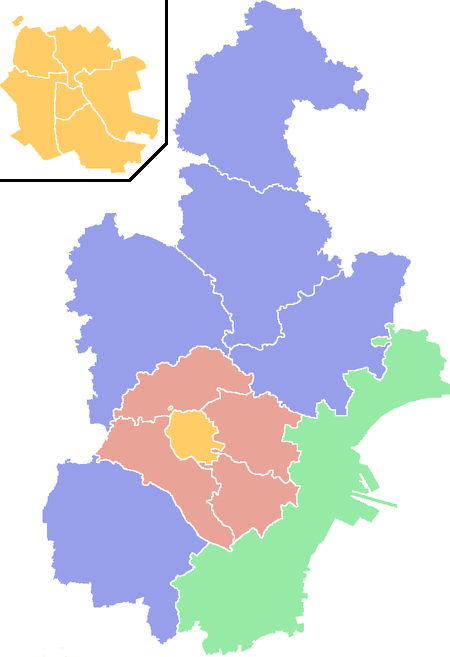
Core districts See inset
1	Heping
2	Hedong
3	Hexi
4	Nankai
5	Hebei
6	Hongqiao
Suburbs
7	Dongli
8	Xiqing
9	Jinnan
10	Beichen
Binhai and Rural
13	Binhai	14	Ninghe
11	Wuqing	15	Jinghai
12	Baodi	16	Ji Zhou

Hebei District (Chinese: 河北区; pinyin: Héběi Qū) is a district of the municipality of Tianjin, People's Republic of China. Its name literally means "District north of the River", as the district is located on the northern shore of the Hai River, part of the Grand Canal. Tianjin's famous Zhongshan Park lies within the district. Tianjin's North Train Station and many other train structures are also located in Hebei District. The district administers ten streets in total.

== Administrative divisions ==
There are 10 subdistricts in the district:

Name	Chinese (S)	Hanyu Pinyin	Population (2010)	Area (km^{2})
Guangfu Avenue Subdistrict	光复道街道	Guāngfùdào Jiēdào	53,407	1.9
Wanghailou Subdistrict	望海楼街道	Wànghǎilóu Jiēdào	86,401	2.25
Hongshunli Subdistrict	鸿顺里街道	Hóngshùnlǐ Jiēdào	94,411	2.58
Xinkaihe Subdistrict	新开河街道	Xīnkāihé Jiēdào	82,661	4.52
Tiedong Road Subdistrict	铁东路街道	Tiědōnglù Jiēdào	73,722	3.46
Jianchang Avenue Subdistrict	建昌道街道	Jiànchāngdào Jiēdào	90,362	5.05
Ningyuan Subdistrict	宁园街道	Níngyuán Jiēdào	47,253	2.31
Wangchuanchang Subdistrict	王串场街道	Wángchuànchǎng Jiēdào	114,109	2.14
Jiangdu Road Subdistrict	江都路街道	Jiāngdūlù Jiēdào	60,561	1.95
Yueyahe Subdistrict	月牙河街道	Yuèyáhé Jiēdào	85,564	1.77

== Transportation ==
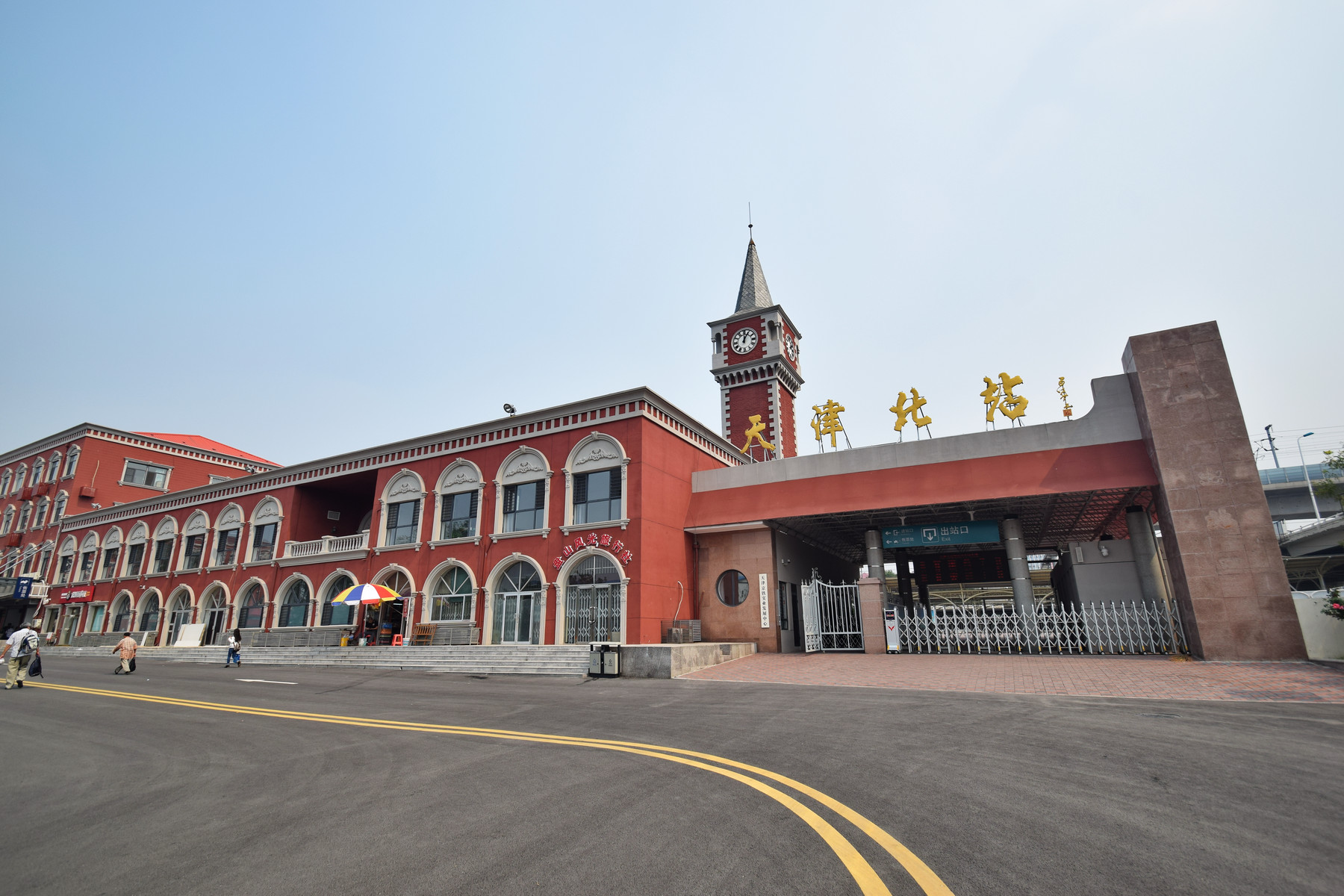
Tianjin North Railway Station

=== Metro ===
Hebei is currently served by two metro lines operated by Tianjin Metro:

- Line 2 - Jianguodao
- Line 3 - Jinshiqiao, Zhongshanlu, Beizhan, Tiedonglu, Zhangxingzhuang

=== Railway ===
Tianjin railway station and Tianjin North railway station are located in Hebei.
