= Wanghailou Subdistrict =

Wanghailou Subdistrict 望海楼街道
- Subdistrict
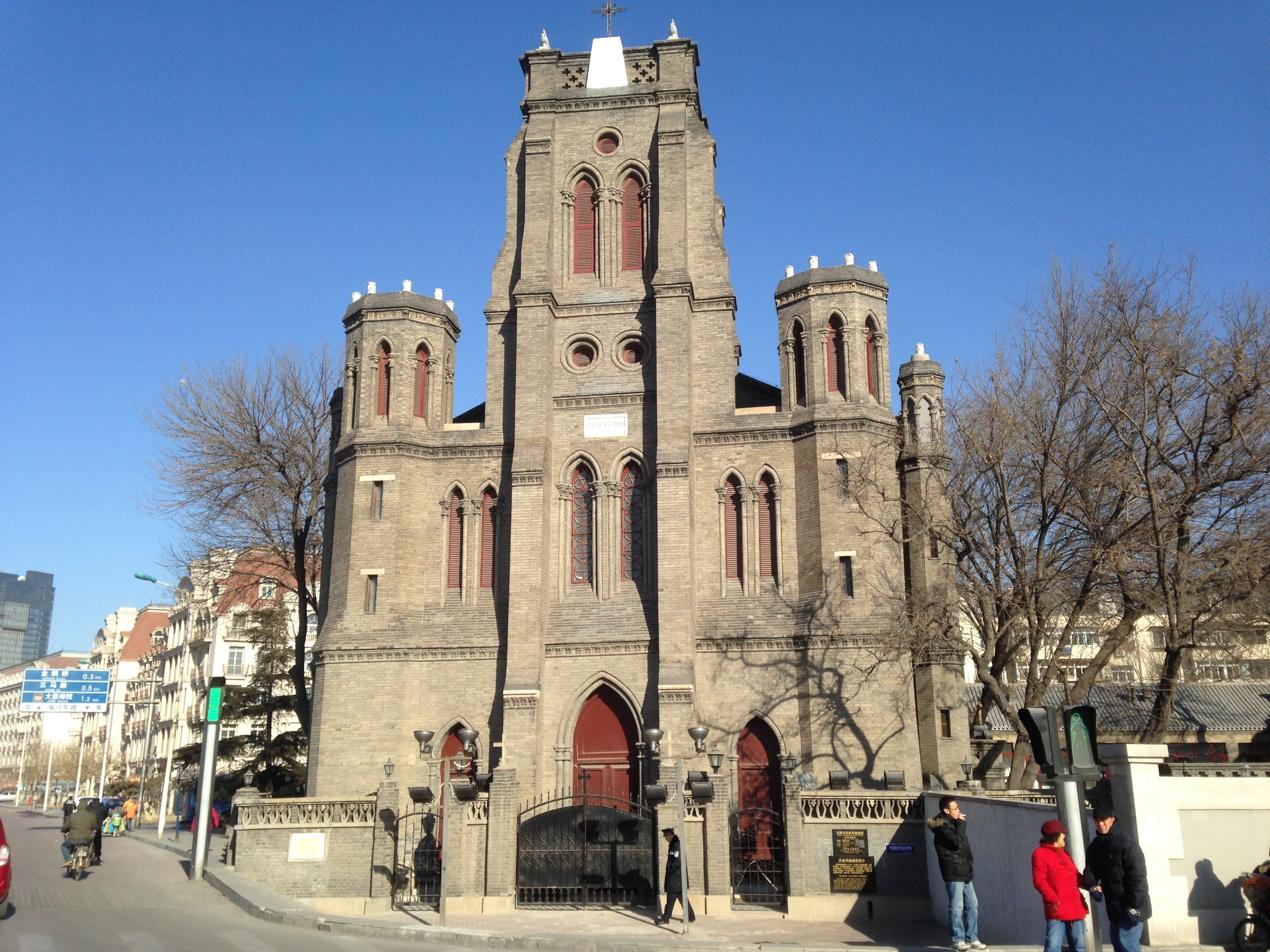
- Wanghailou Catheral, the namesake of the subdistrict, 2014

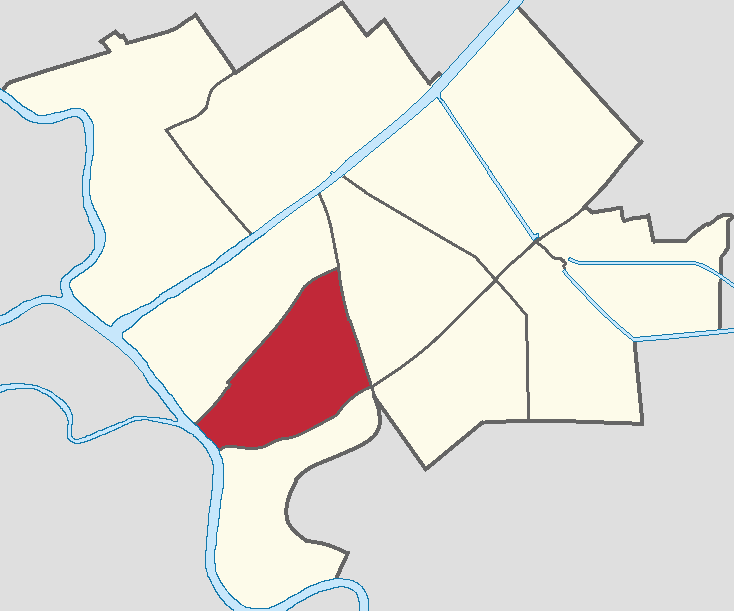
- Location of Wanghailou Subdistrict in Hebei District

- Location within Tianjin Location within China
- Coordinates: 39°09′28″N 117°12′10″E
- Country: China
- Municipality: Tianjin
- District: Hebei
- Village-level Divisions: 11 communities

Area
  - Total: 2.07 km^{2} (0.80 sq mi)
- Elevation: 8 m (26 ft)

Population (2010)
  - Total: 86,401
  - Density: 41,700/km^{2} (108,000/sq mi)
- Time zone: UTC+8 (China Standard)
- Postal code: 300140
- Area code: 022

Wanghailou Subdistrict (simplified Chinese: 望海楼街道; traditional Chinese: 望海樓街道; pinyin: Wànghǎilóu Jiēdào) is a subdistrict located on the western side of Hebei District, Tianjin, China. It shares border with Hongshunli Subdistrict in its northwest, Ningyuan Subdistrict in its northeast, Guangfu Avenue Subdistrict in its southeast, and Dahutong Subdistrict in its southwest. In the year 2010, its population was 86,401.

The subdistrict was named after Wanghailou (Chinese: 望海楼; lit. 'View Sea Building') Catherla that is located on the southwest of the subdistrict.

== Geography ==
Wanghailou subdistrict is on the eastern bank of Hai River.

== History ==
Timetable of Wanghailou Subdistrict
Year	Status	Under
1954 - 1956	10 subdistricts: Xiaoguan Street; Jinyiweiqiao; Zhouqiaozhuang; Tudimiao; Shuitizi; Jinjiayao; Dong Sanjing Road; Dong Sijing Road; Dong Bajing Road; Kunwei Road	3rd District, Tianjin
1956 - 1958	7 subdistricts: Xiaoguan Street; Tudimiao; Shuitizi; Dong Sanjing Road; Dong Bajing Road; Shizi Street; Kunwei Road	Hebei District, Tianjin
1958 - 1960	5 subdistricts: Xiaoguan Street; Tudimiao; Shuitizi; Dong Sanjing Road; Dong Bajing Road	Hebei District, Tianjin
1960 - 1962	Xiaoguan Dajie People's Commune; Dong Liujing Road People's Commune	Hebei District, Tianjin
1962 - 1963	Xiaoguan Dajie Subdistrict; Jinjiayao Subdistrict	Hebei District, Tianjin
1963 - 1966	Xiaoguan Dajie Subdistrict; Jinjiayao Subdistrict; Dong Liujing Road Subdistrict	Hebei District, Tianjin
1966 - 1968	Xiaoguan Dajie Subdistrict; Jinjiayao Subdistrict; Dong Liujing Road Subdistrict	Weidong District, Tianjin
1968 - 1990	Xiaoguan Dajie Subdistrict; Jinjiayao Subdistrict; Dong Liujing Road Subdistrict	Hebei District, Tianjin
1990 - 2000	Xiaoguan Dajie Subdistrict; Dong Liujing Road Subdistrict	
2000–present	Wanghailou Subdistrict	

== Administrative divisions ==
In 2021, Wanghailou Subdistrict consisted of 11 residential communities, which are listed as follows:

Subdivision names	Name transliterations
昆璞里	Kunpuli
昆云里	Kunyuli
乾华园	Qianhuayuan
金辰园	Jinchenyuan
振德里	Zhendeli
望海楼	Wanghailou
金钟家园	Jinzhong Jiayuan
中远里	Zhongyuanli
金田花园	Jintian Huayuan
金狮家园	Jinshi Huayuan
金兆园	Jinzhaoyuan

== Gallery ==
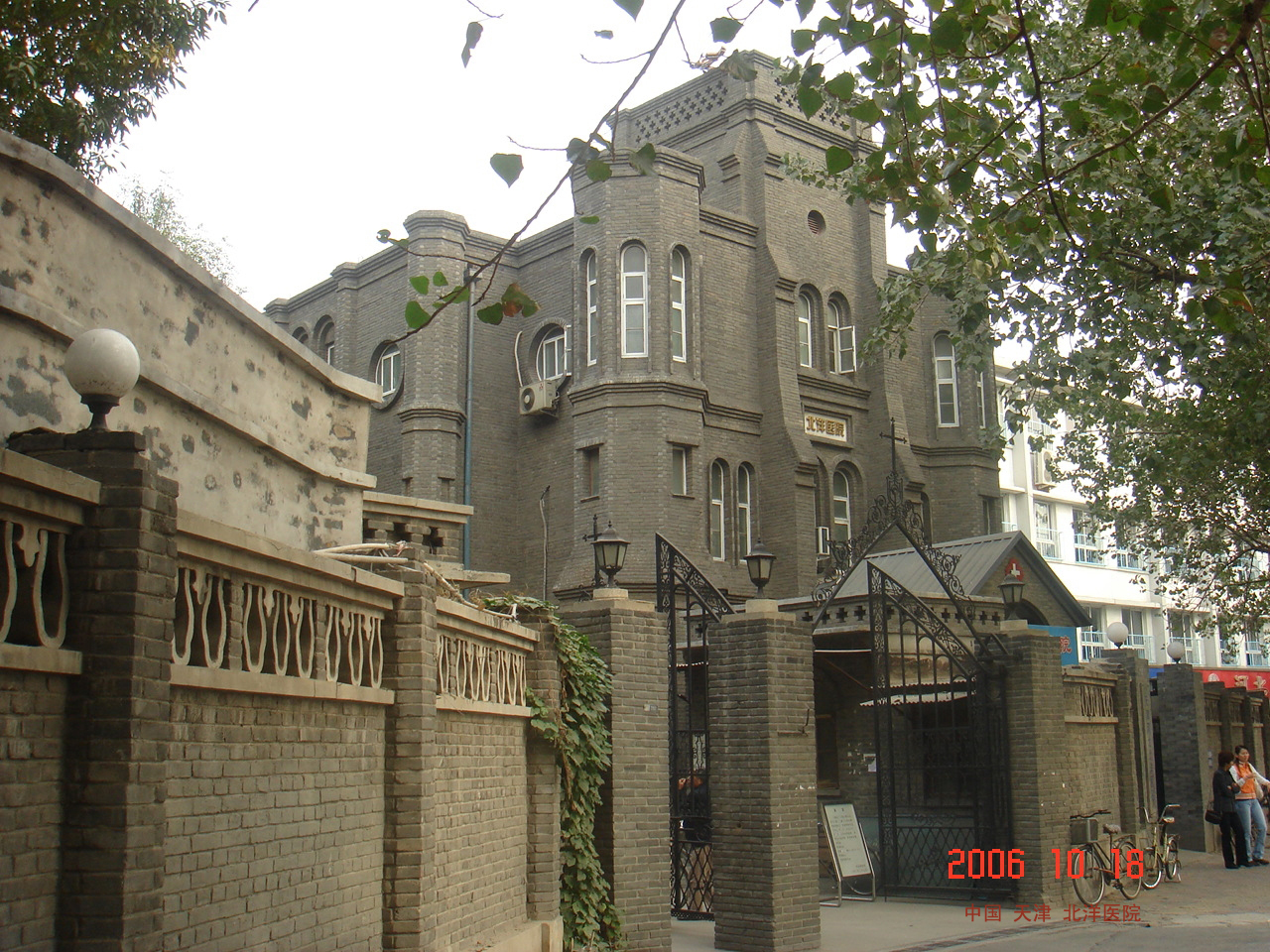
Tianjin Beiyang Hospital, 2006

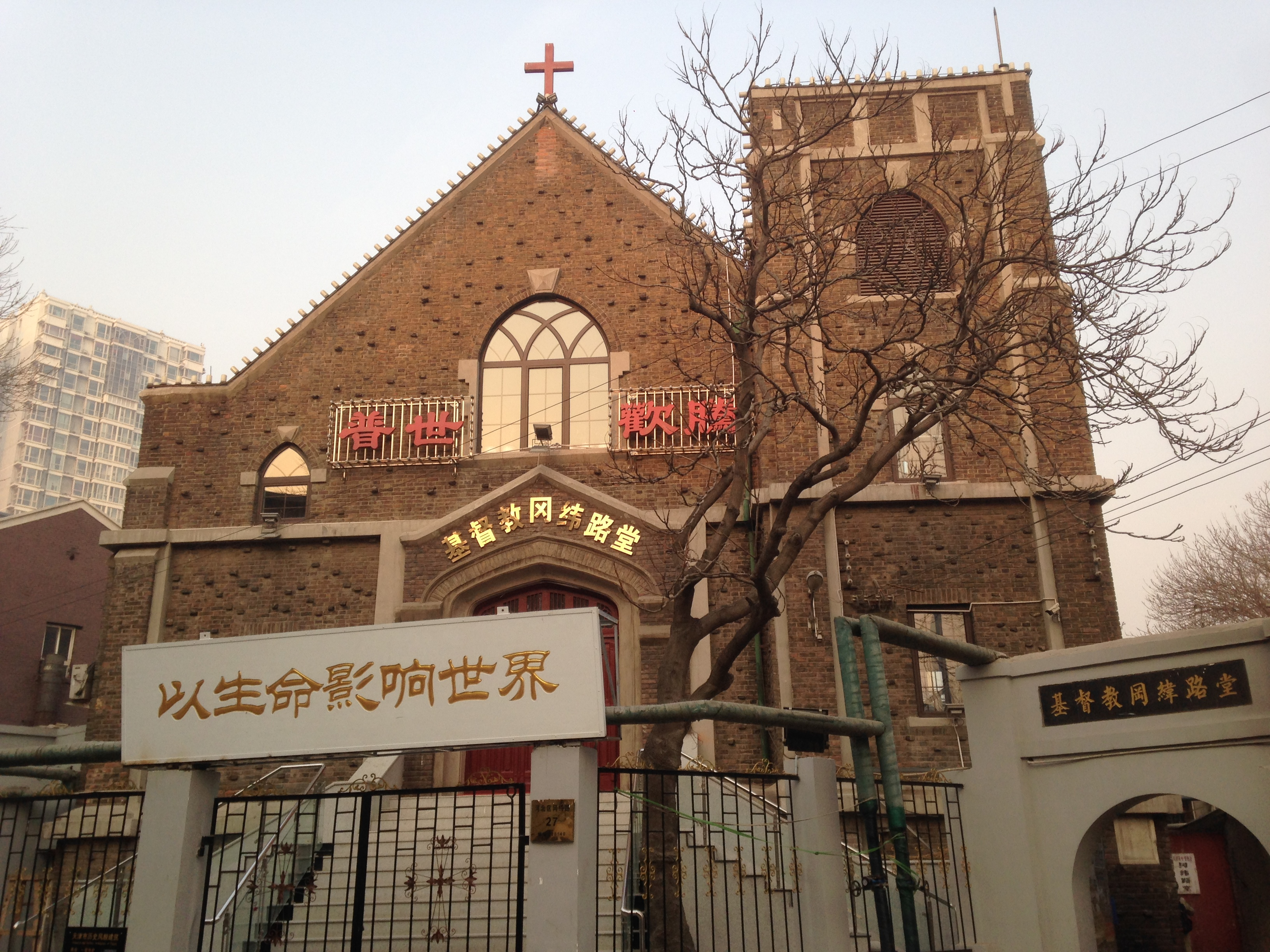
Gangweilu Catheral, 2014

Jinjiayao Mosque, 2014

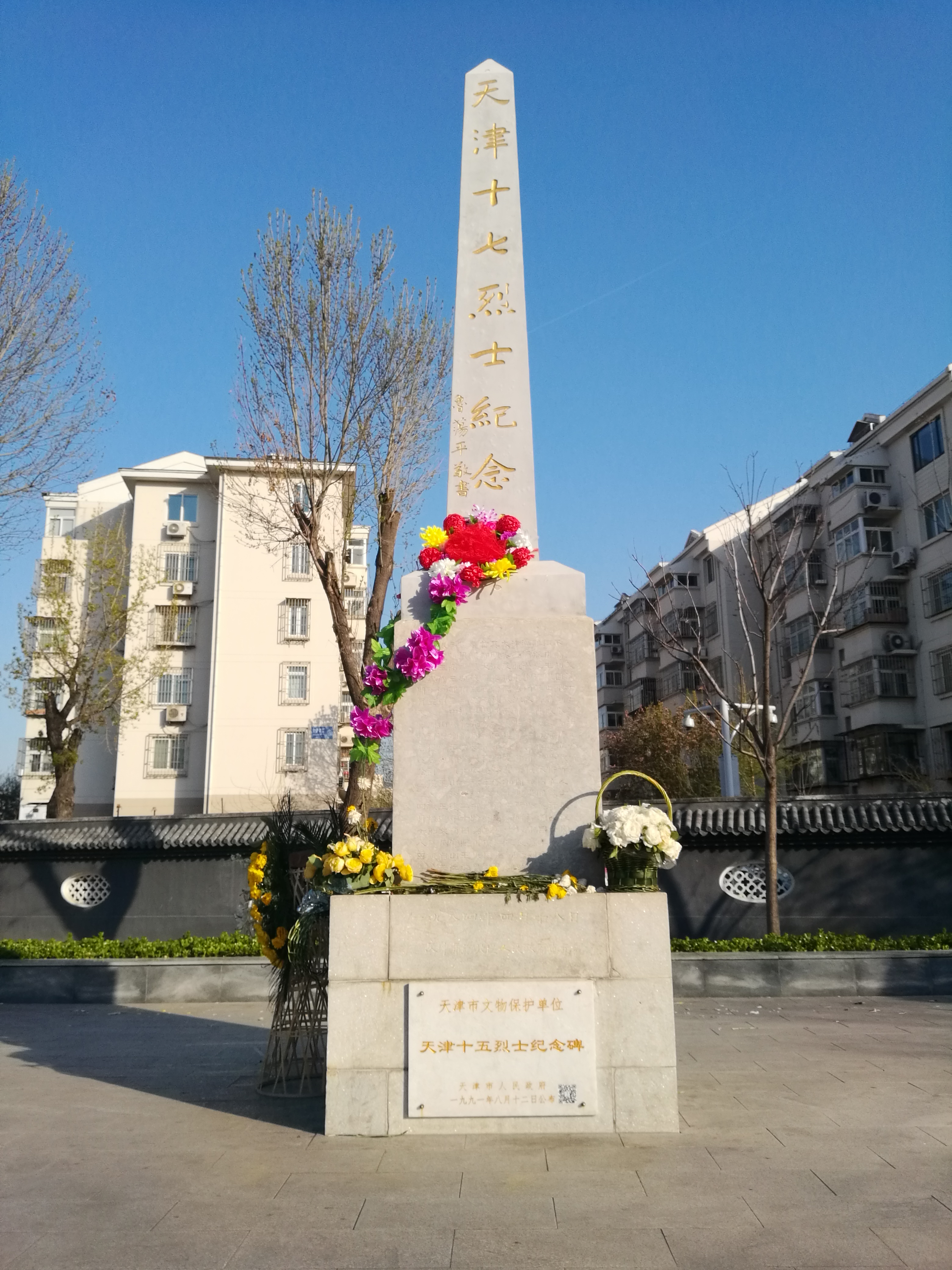
Monument of 17 Tianjin Martyrs, 2018
