= Hongshunli Subdistrict =

Hongshunli Subdistrict 鸿顺里街道
- Subdistrict
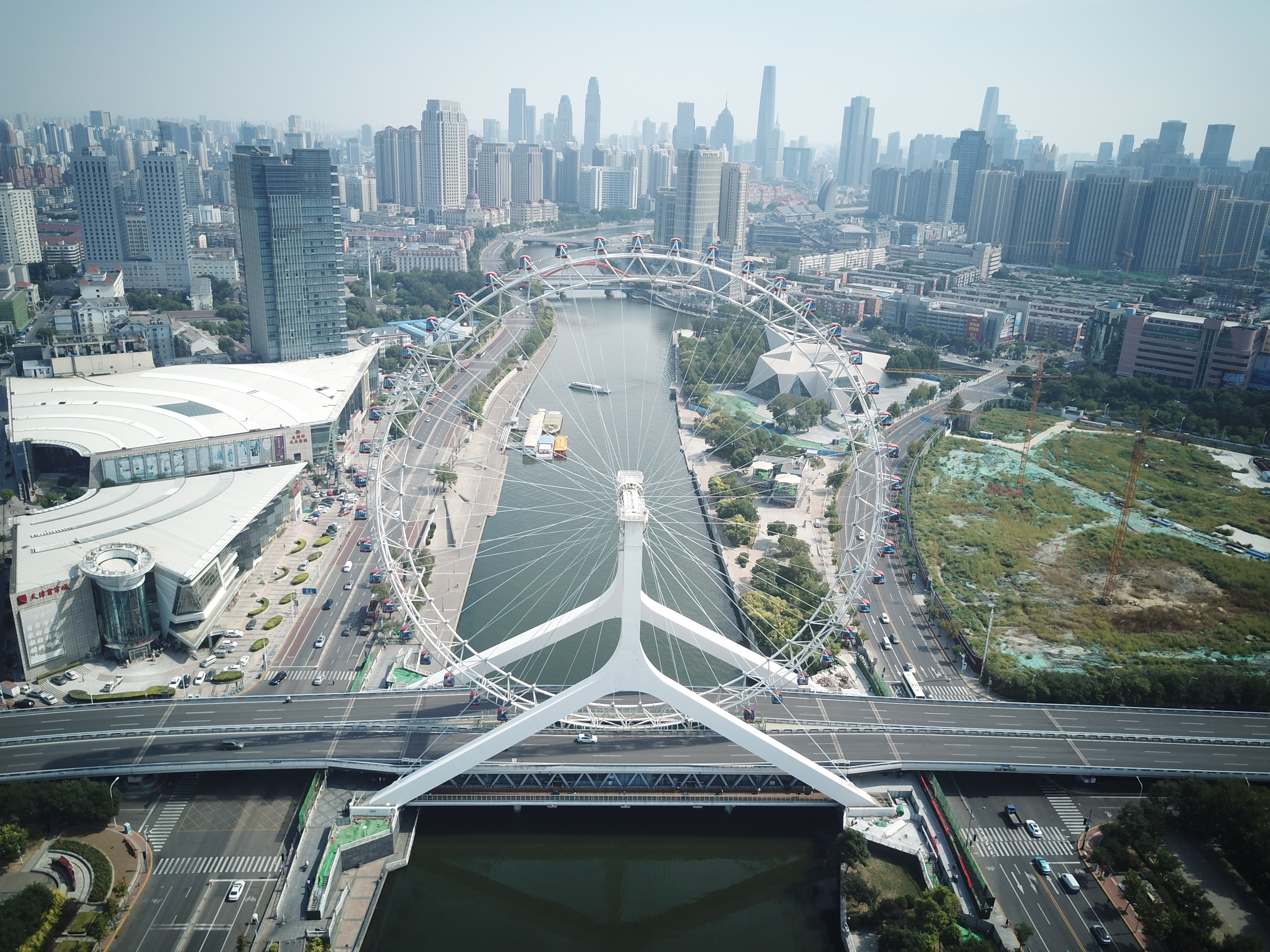
- Aerial view of Tianjin Eye, 2019

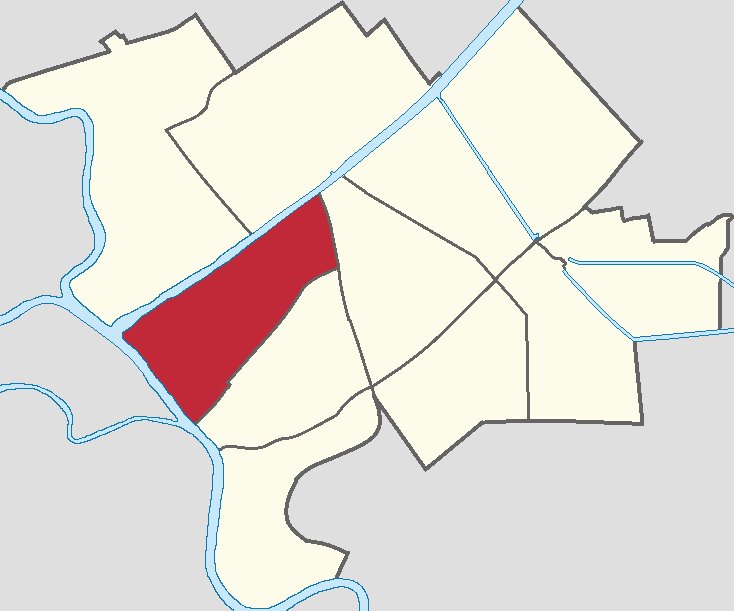
- Location within Hebei District

- Location within Tianjin Location within China
- Coordinates: 39°09′26″N 117°11′20″E
- Country: China
- Municipality: Tianjin
- District: Hebei
- Village-level Divisions: 11 communities

Area
  - Total: 2.67 km^{2} (1.03 sq mi)
- Elevation: 7 m (23 ft)

Population (2010)
  - Total: 94,411
  - Density: 35,400/km^{2} (91,600/sq mi)
- Time zone: UTC+8 (China Standard)
- Postal code: 300141
- Area code: 022

Hongshunli Subdistrict (simplified Chinese: 鸿顺里街道; traditional Chinese: 鴻順裏街道; pinyin: Hóngshùnlǐ Jiēdào) is a subdistrict located within Hebei District, Tianjin, China. It shares a border with Xinkaihe and Tiedong Road Subdistricts in the northwest, Ningyuan Subdistrict in the northeast, Wanghailou Subdistrict in the southeast, Santiaoshi and Dahutong Subdistircts in the southwest. In the year 2010, its population was 94,411.

Its name Hongshunli can be literally translated as "Great Success Neighborhood".

== Geography ==
Hongshunli subdistrict is on the east of Hai River and southeast of Xinkai River. Waihuan East Road passes through the northeast of the subdistrict.

== History ==
Timeline of Hongshunli Subdistrict
Year	Status	Part of
1949 - 1952	Hongshunli Street	2nd District, Tianjin
1952 - 1954	Hongshunli Street	3rd District, Tianjin
1954 - 1956	Hongshunli Subdistrict	3rd District, Tianjin
1956 - 1958	Hongshunli Subdistrict	Hebei District, Tianjin
1958 - 1962	Hongshunli Urban People's Commune	Hebei District, Tianjin
1962 - 1966	Hongshunli Subdistrict	Hebei District, Tianjin
1966 - 1968	Hongshunli Subdistrict	Weidong District, Tianjin
1968 - 1978	Hongshunli Revolutionary Committee	Hebei District, Tianjin
1978–present	Hongshunli Subdistrict (Huangwei Road Subdistrict was added in 1990; Zhongshan Road Subdistrict in 2000)	Hebei District, Tianjin

== Administrative divisions ==
The table below lists all the 11 residential communities under Hongshunli Subdistrict in 2021:

Subdivision names	Name transliterations
六马路	Liumalu
律纬路	Lüweilu
月纬路	Yueweilu
律笛里	Lüdili
日远里	Riyuanli
鸿顺里	Hongshunli
团结里	Tuanjieli
元吉里	Yuanjili
九八三	Jiubasan
宝兴里	Baoxingli
三戒里	Sanjieli

== Landmarks ==
- Tianjin Eye
- Temple of Great Compassion

== Gallery ==
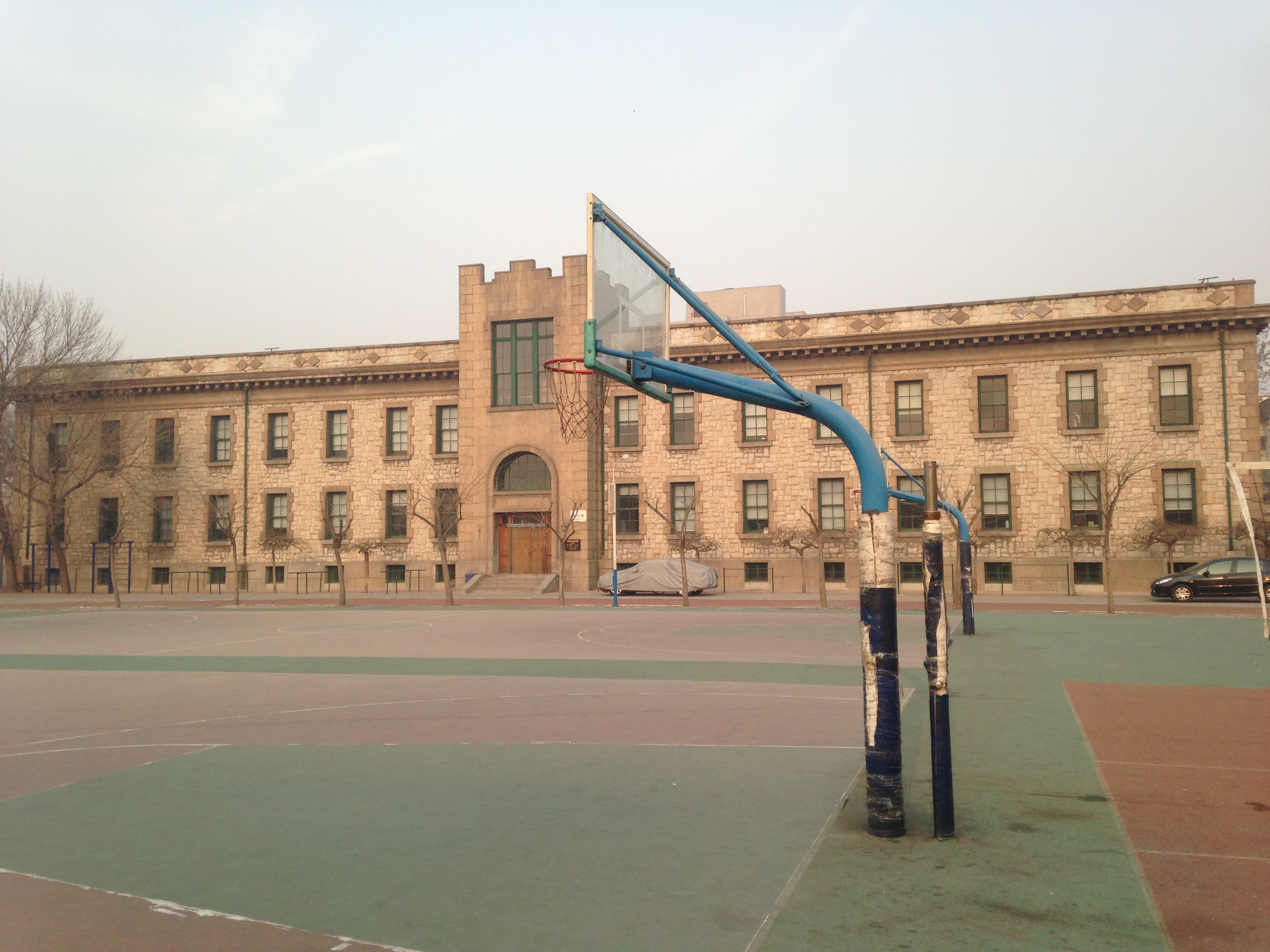
Fulun Middle School, 2014

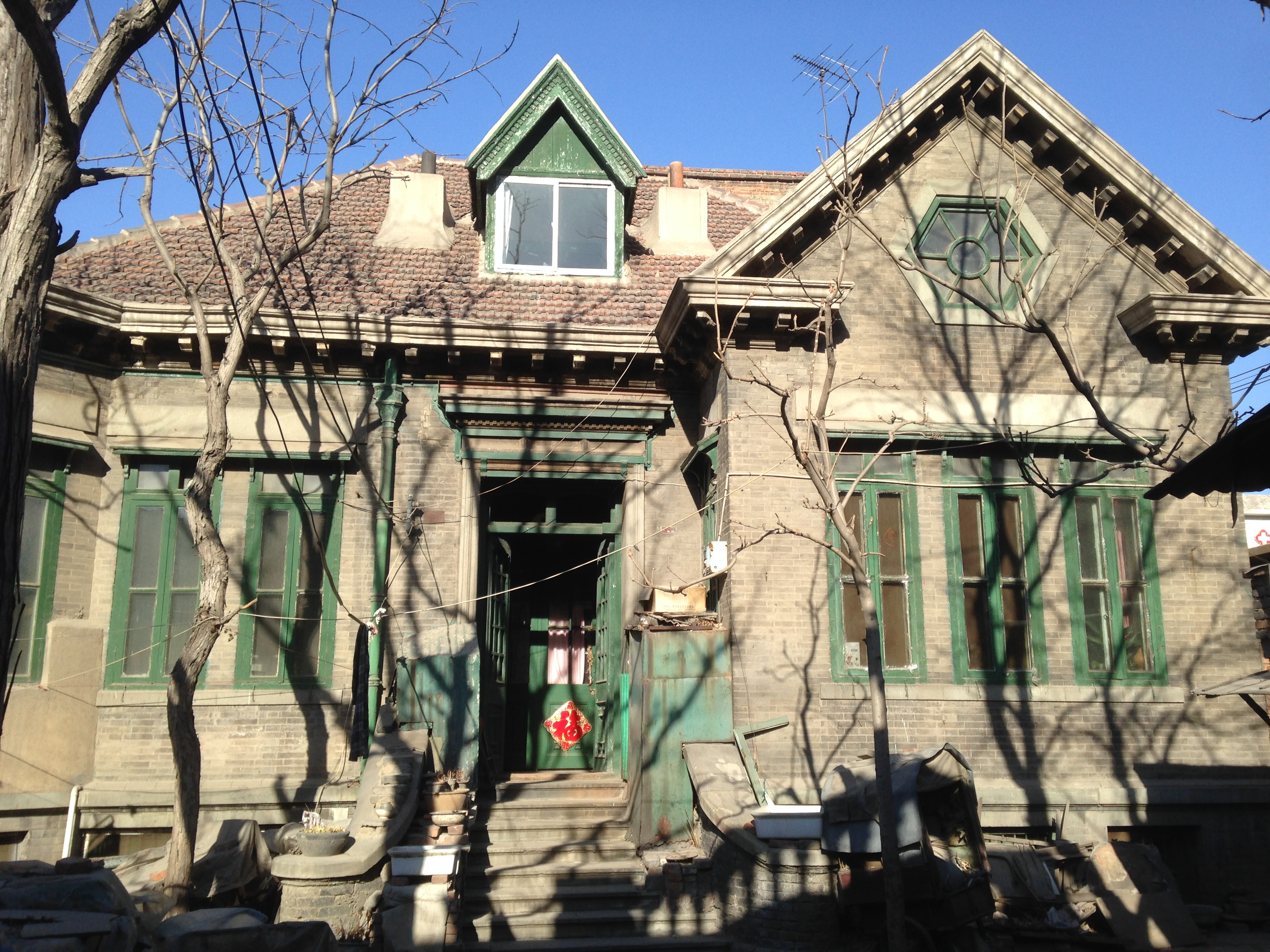
Historical Structure in Sanma Road, 2014

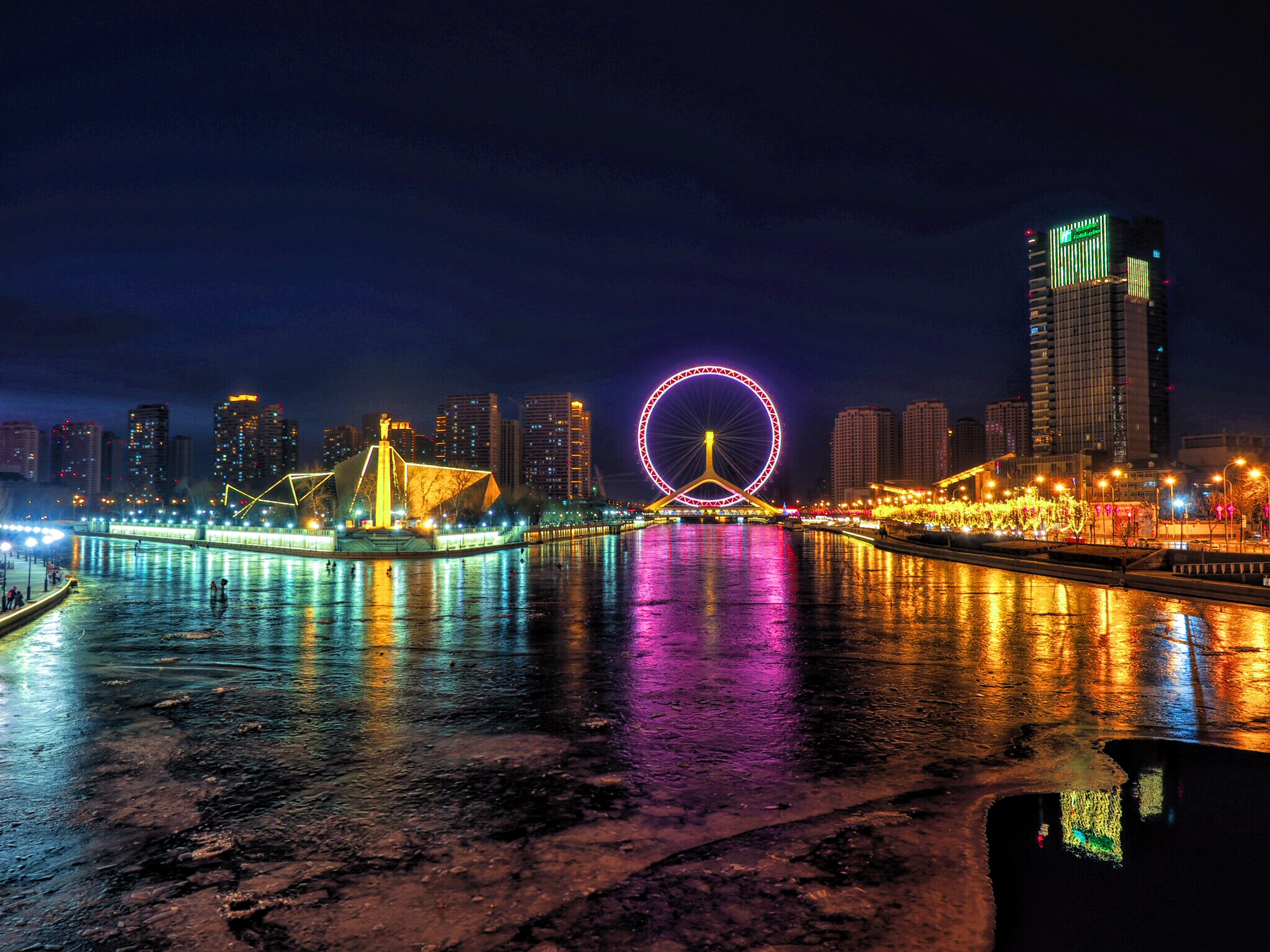
Night view of Hai River near Hongshunli Subdistrict, 2016

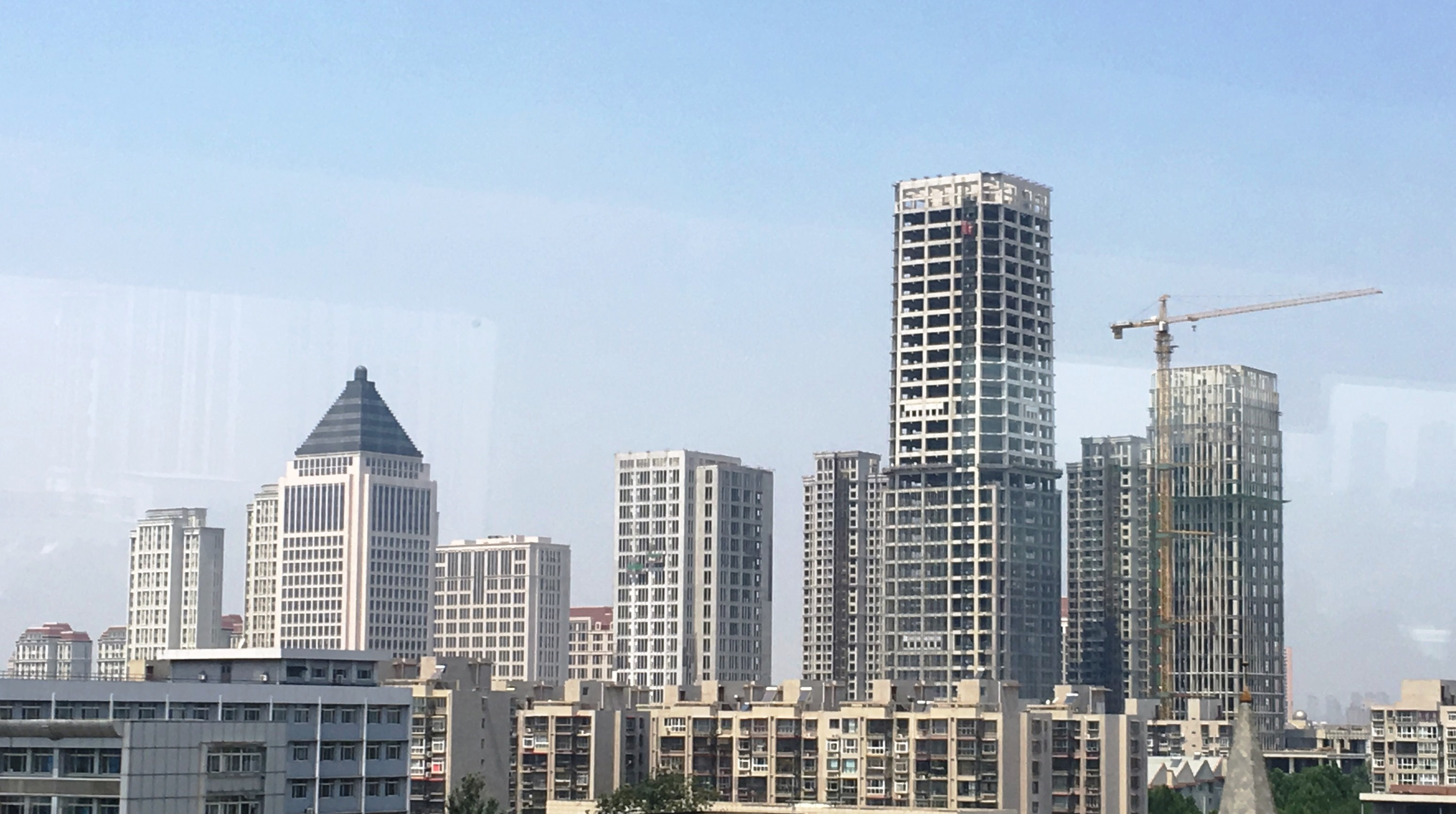
Skyline of Hongshunli, 2017
