= Jianchang Avenue Subdistrict =

Jianchang Avenue Subdistrict 建昌道街道
- Subdistrict
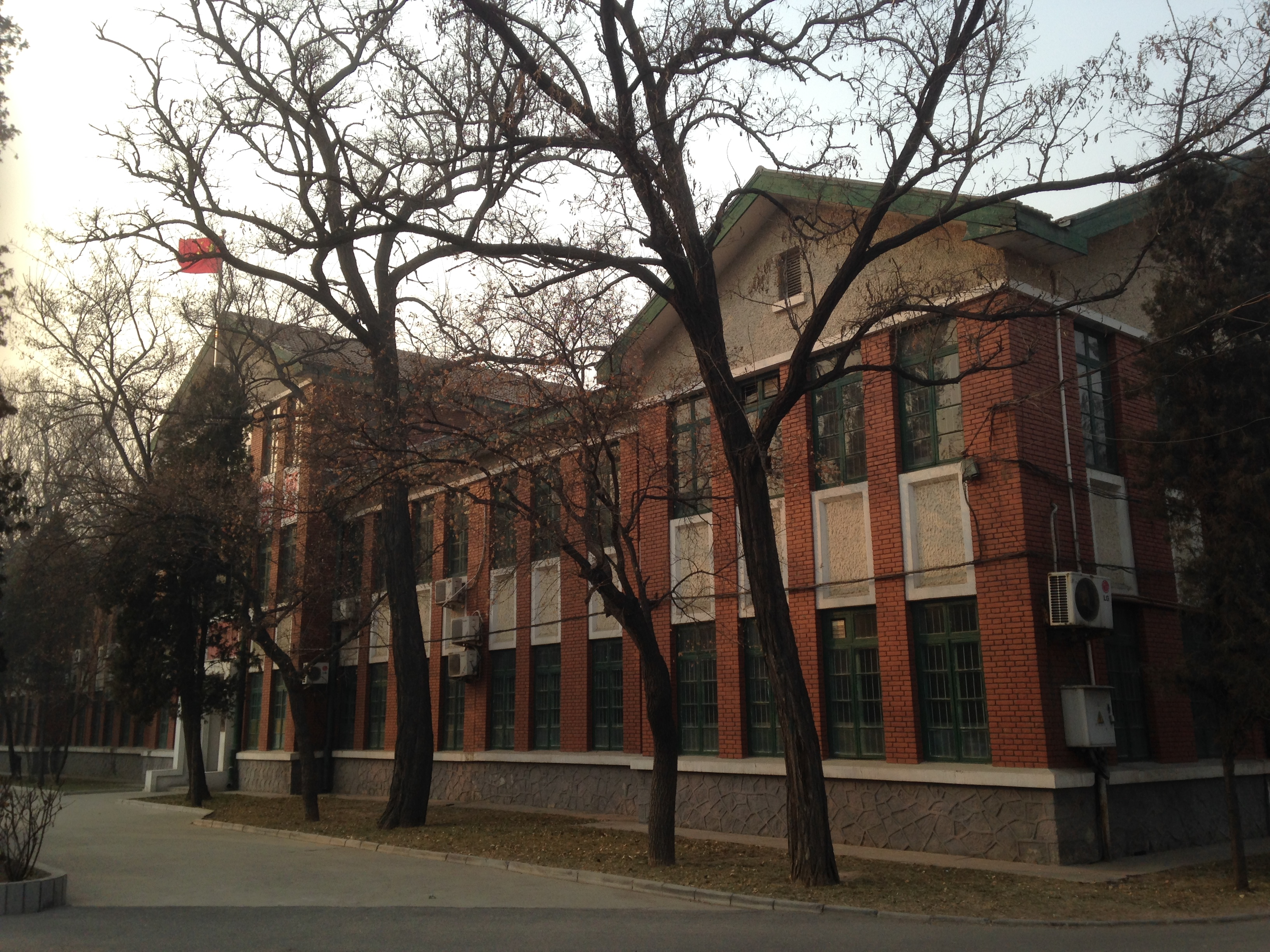
- Protected historical site along Jianchang Avenue, 2014

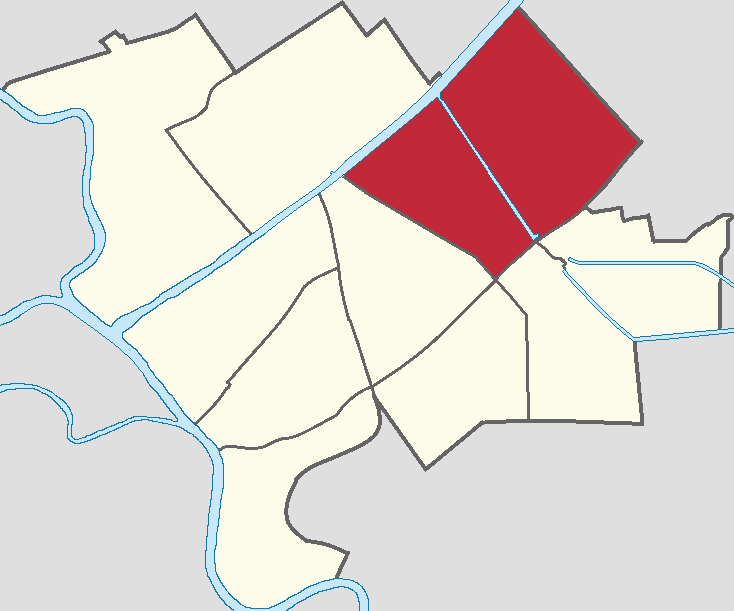
- Location within Hebei District

- Location within Tianjin Location within China
- Coordinates: 39°10′12″N 117°13′25″E
- Country: China
- Municipality: Tianjin
- District: Hebei
- Village-level Divisions: 17 communities

Area
  - Total: 5.32 km^{2} (2.05 sq mi)
- Elevation: 7 m (23 ft)

Population (2010)
  - Total: 90,362
  - Density: 17,000/km^{2} (44,000/sq mi)
- Time zone: UTC+8 (China Standard)
- Postal code: 300143
- Area code: 022

Jianchang Avenue Subdistrict (Chinese: 建昌道街道; pinyin: Jiànchāngdào Jiēdào) is a subdistrict situated at the northern portion of Hebei District, Tianjin, China. It borders Yixingbu Town and Jinzhong Subdistrict to its north, Jiangdu Road and Yueyahe Subdistricts to its southeast, as well as Ningyuan and Tiedong Road Subdistricts to its west. It had 90,362 people residing under its administration as of 2010.

The subdistrict was created in 1981. It was named after Jianchang (Chinese: 建昌; lit. 'Build Prosperity') Avenue that passes through it.

== Geography ==
Jianchang Avenue subdistrict is on the southern bank of Xinkai River, and is bypassed by the Beitang Paishui River.

== Administrative divisions ==
At the end of 2021, a total of 17 residential communities constituted Jianchang Avenue Subdistrict. They are organized into the following list:

Subdivision names	Name transliterations
诗景雅苑	Shijing Yayuan
盛祥家园	Shengxiang Jiayuan
建北里	Jianbeili
建昌里	Jianchangli
工程里	Gongchengli
建湖里	Jianhuli
诗景凤苑	Shijing Fengyuan
福桥里	Fuqiaoli
康桥里	Kangqiaoli
香湾凤苑	Xiangwan Fengyuan
乐桥里	Leqiaoli
三和	Sanhe
梅宏园	Meihongyuan
富水一方	Fushui Yifang
春和景明	Chunhe Jingming
诗景颂苑	Shijing Songyuan
兴河园	Xingheyuan
