= Guangfu Avenue Subdistrict =

Guangfu Avenue Subdistrict 光复道街道
- Subdistrict
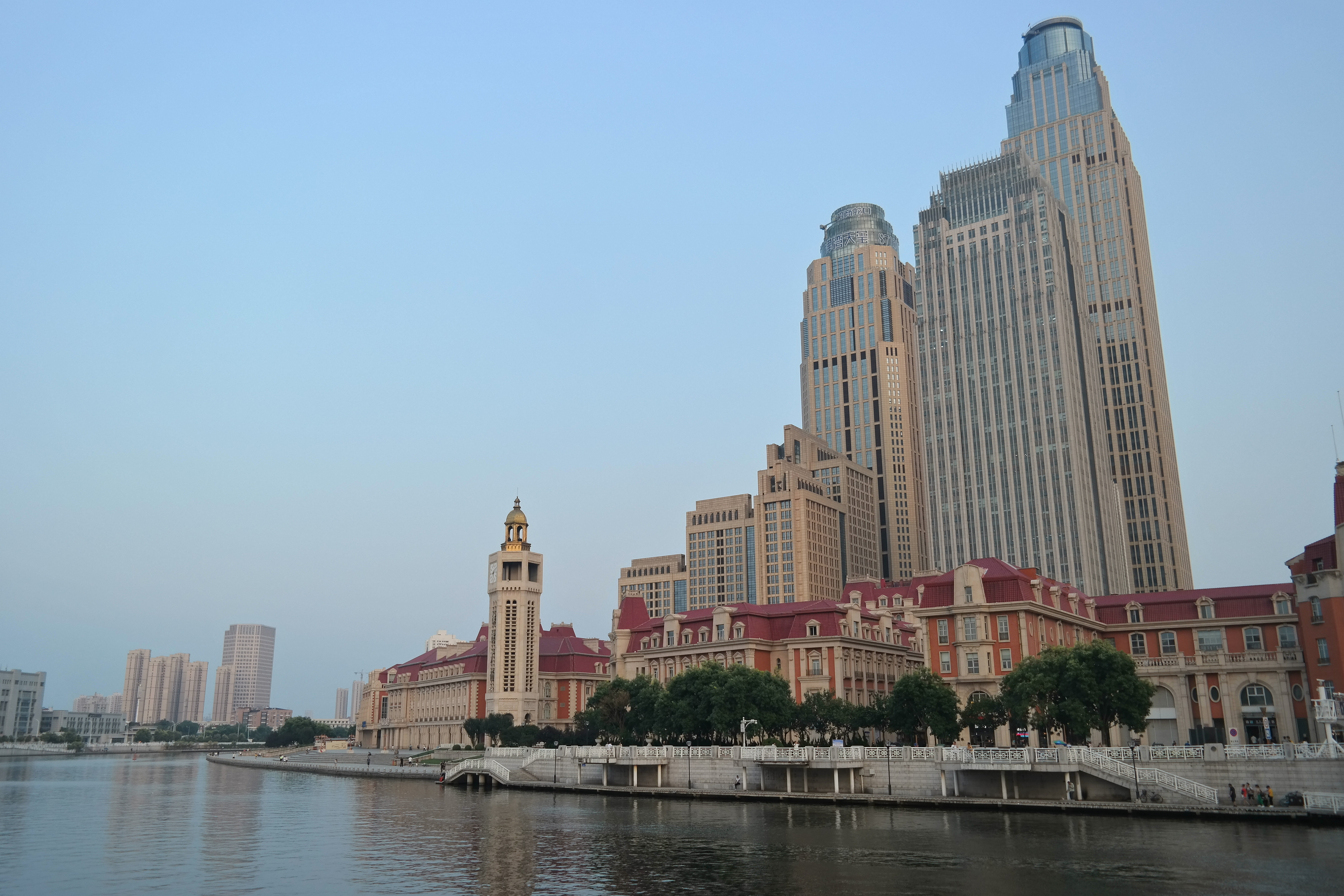
- Section of Hai River within the subdistrict, 2019

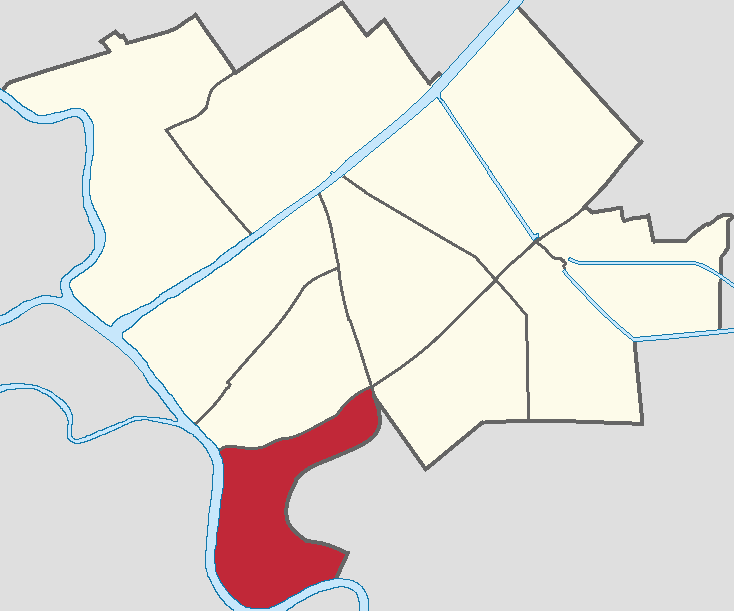
- Location in Hebei District

- Location within Tianjin Location within China
- Coordinates: 39°08′48″N 117°12′11″E
- Country: China
- Municipality: Tianjin
- District: Hebei
- Village-level Divisions: 9 communities

Area
  - Total: 2.24 km^{2} (0.86 sq mi)
- Elevation: 7 m (23 ft)

Population (2010)
  - Total: 73,346
  - Density: 32,700/km^{2} (84,800/sq mi)
- Time zone: UTC+8 (China Standard)
- Postal code: 300143
- Area code: 022

Guangfu Avenue Subdistrict (simplified Chinese: 光复道街道; traditional Chinese: 光復道街道; pinyin: Guāngfùdào Jiēdào) is a subdistrict located in the southern section of Hebei District, Tianjin, China. It shares border with Wanghailou Subdistrict to its north, Wangchuanchang and Chunhua Subdistricts to its east, Xiaobailou and Quanyechang Subdistricts to its south, as well as Nanshi and Gulou Subdistricts to its west. Its total population was 53,407 as of 2010.

The subdistrict was named after Guangfu (Chinese: 光复; lit. 'Recapture') Avenue that runs through it.

== Geography ==
Guangfu Avenue subdistrict is on the northern shore of Hai River

== History ==
Timetable of Guangfu Avenue Subdistrict
Year	Status	Within
1730 - 1900		Tianjin County
1900 - 1943		Part of Foreign Concessions in Tianjin
1943 - 1945		Special Management District, Tianjin
1945 - 1952		2nd District, Tianjin
1952 - 1954	Jianguo Avenue; Ping'an Street; Minsheng Road	3rd District, Tianjin
1954 - 1956	Jianguo Avenue Subdistrict; Ping'an Street Subdistrict; Minsheng Road Subdistrict	3rd District, Tianjin
1956 - 1958	Jianguo Avenue Subdistrict	Hebei District, Tianjin
1958 - 1960	Jianguo Avenue People's Commune	Heping District, Tianjin
1960 - 1962	Guangfu Avenue People's Commune	Hebei District, Tianjin
1962 - 1966	Guangfu Avenue Subdistrict	Hebei District, Tianjin
1966 - 1968	Guangfu Avenue Subdistrict	Weudong District, Tianjin
1968 - 1978	Guangfu Avenue Revolutionary Committee	Hebei District, Tianjin
1978–present	Guangfu Avenue Subdistrict	Hebei District, Tianjin

== Administrative divisions ==
At the time of writing, Guangfu Avenue Subdistrict consists of 9 residential communities, they are:

Subdivision names	Name transliterations
北岸华庭	Bei'an Huating
林古里	Linguli
爱琴海	Aiqinhai
庆安街	Qing'anjie
建国道	Jianguodao
昌海里	Changhaili
瑞海名苑	Ruihai Mingyuan
君临天下	Junlin Tianxia
旺海公府	Wanghai Gongfu

== Gallery ==
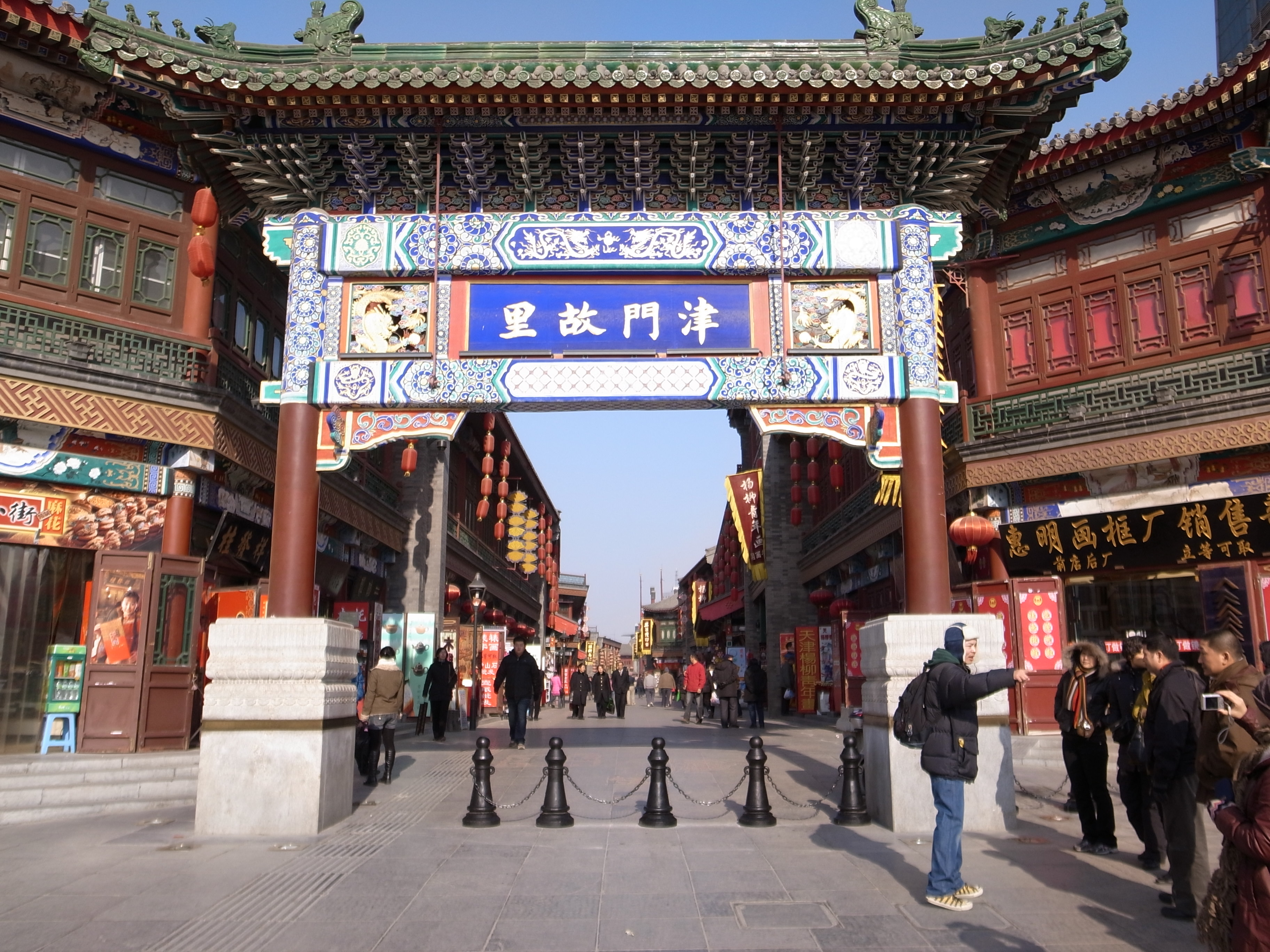
Entrance of Jinmen Guli Custom Street, 2009

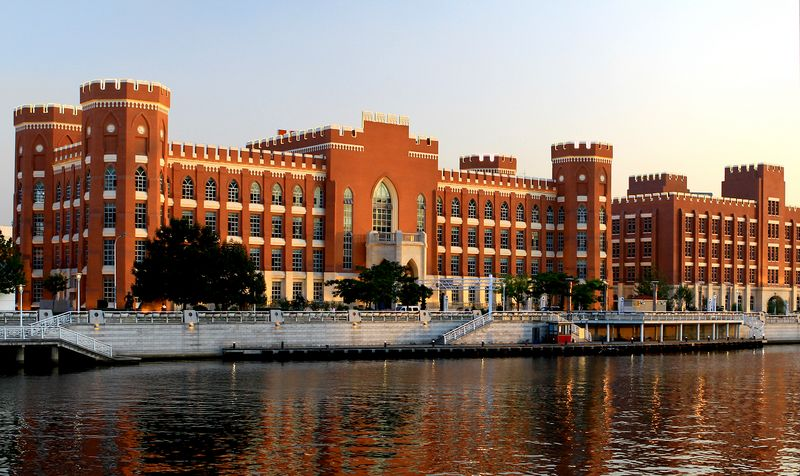
Gorden Hall on the bank of Hai River, 2010

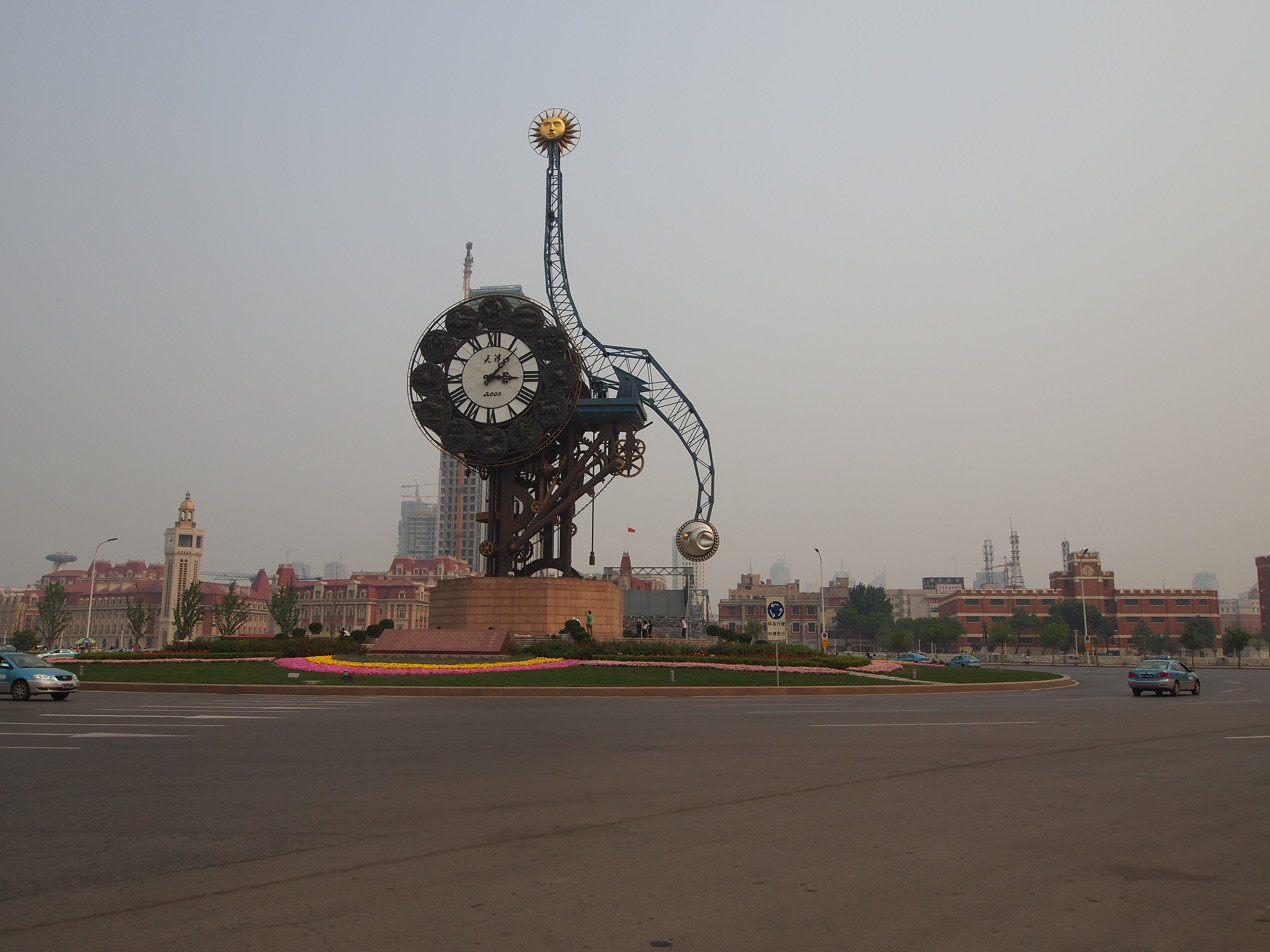
Century Clock on the southeast of the subdistrict, 2012

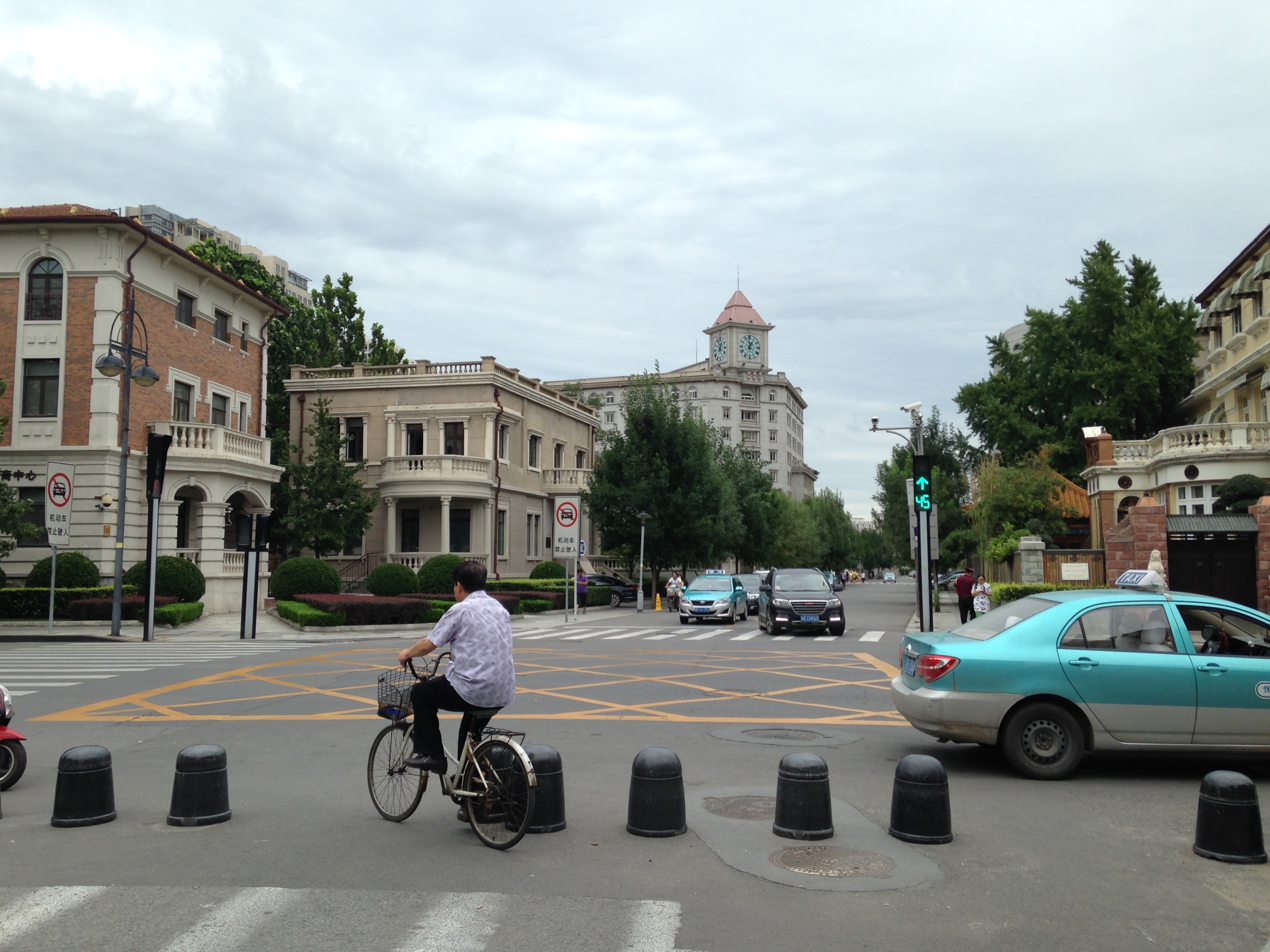
Minzu Road within the former concession, 2016
