= Tiedonglu Subdistrict =

Tiedonglu Subdistrict 铁东路街道
- Subdistrict
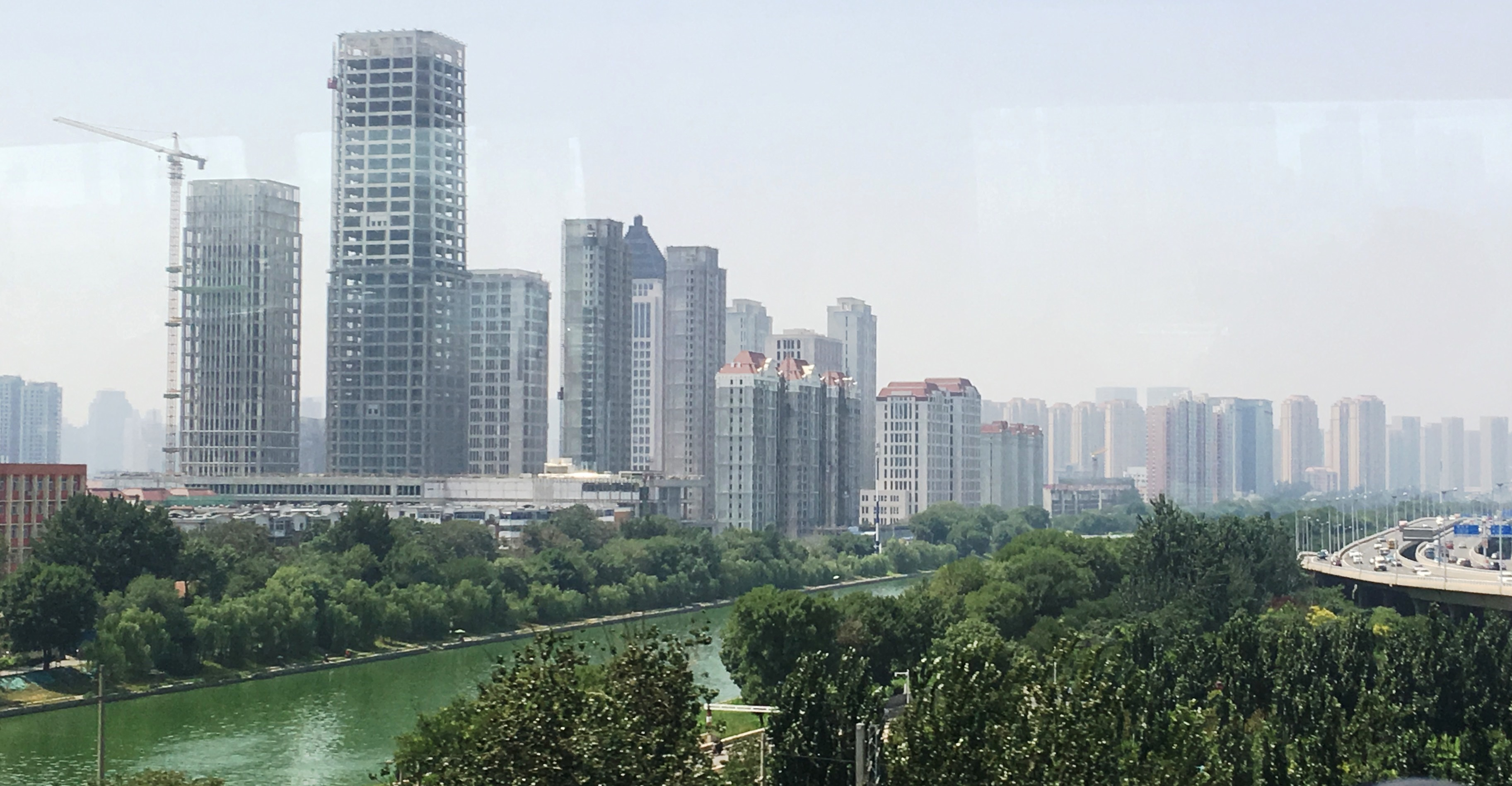
- View of Xinkai River from Tiedonglu Subdsitrict, 2017

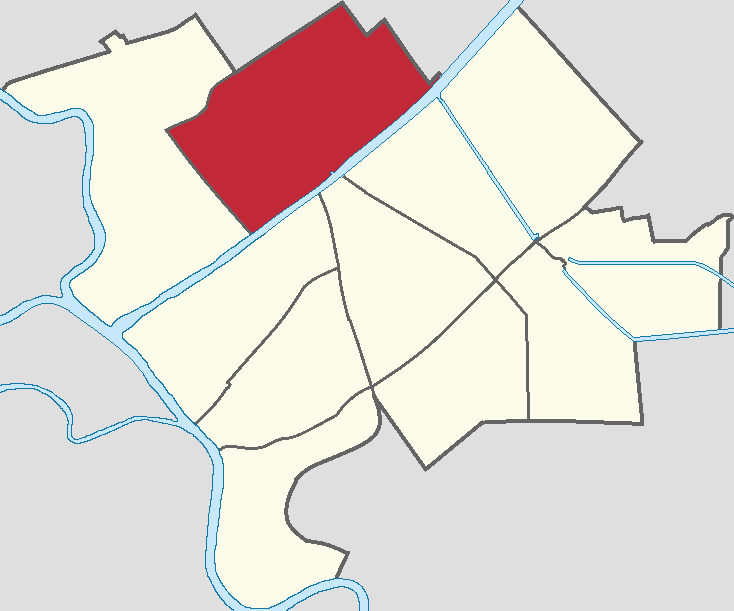
- Location of Tiedonglu Subdistrict within Hebei District

- Location within Tianjin Location within China
- Coordinates: 39°11′16″N 117°11′51″E
- Country: China
- Municipality: Tianjin
- District: Hebei
- Village-level Divisions: 12 communities

Area
  - Total: 3.94 km^{2} (1.52 sq mi)
- Elevation: 6 m (20 ft)

Population (2010)
  - Total: 73,722
  - Density: 18,700/km^{2} (48,500/sq mi)
- Time zone: UTC+8 (China Standard)
- Postal code: 300232
- Area code: 022

Tiedonglu Subdistrict (simplified Chinese: 铁东路街道; traditional Chinese: 鐵東路街道; pinyin: Tiědōnglù Jiēdào) is a subdistrict situated within Hebei District, Tianjin, China. It borders Tianmu Town and Pudong Subdistrict in its northwest, Yixingbu Town and Jianchang Avenue Subdistrict in its east, Ningyuan and Hongshunli Subdistricts in its south, and Xinkaihe Subdistrict in its west. As of the 2010 census, the subdistrict had 73,722 residents under its administration.

This subdistrict was created in 1990, and it was named after Tiedong (Chinese: 铁东; lit. 'Rail East') Road that runs through it.

== Geography ==
Tiedonglu subdistrict is situated on the northern bank of Xinkai River.

== Administrative divisions ==
At the time of writing, Tiedonglu Subdistrict is formed from 12 residential communities, all of which can be seen in the list below:

| Subdivision names | Name transliterations |
|---|---|
| 华宜里 | Huayili |
| 振宜里 | Zhenyili |
| 胜景 | Shengjing |
| 曙光路 | Shuguanglu |
| 爱贤里 | Aixianli |
| 志成中里 | Zhicheng Zhongli |
| 繁华里 | Fanhuali |
| 宜清园 | Yiqingyuan |
| 慧景园 | Huijingyuan |
| 敬贤里 | Jingxianli |
| 北宁湾 | Beiningwan |
| 宁湾家园 | Ningwan Jiayuan |

== Gallery ==
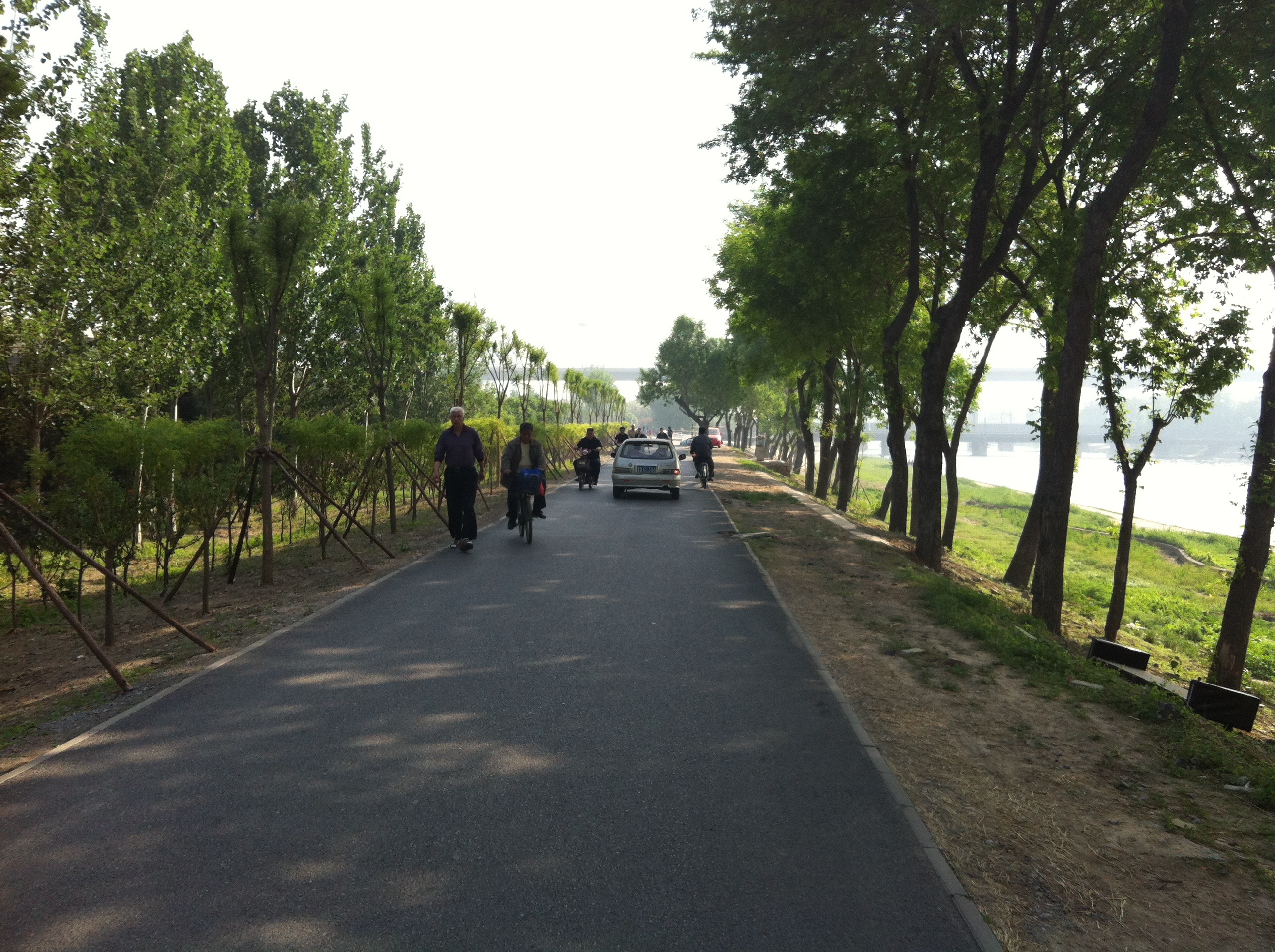
Path along the Xinkai River, 2012

Former Site of Xigu Airport of Jinpu Railway, 2014

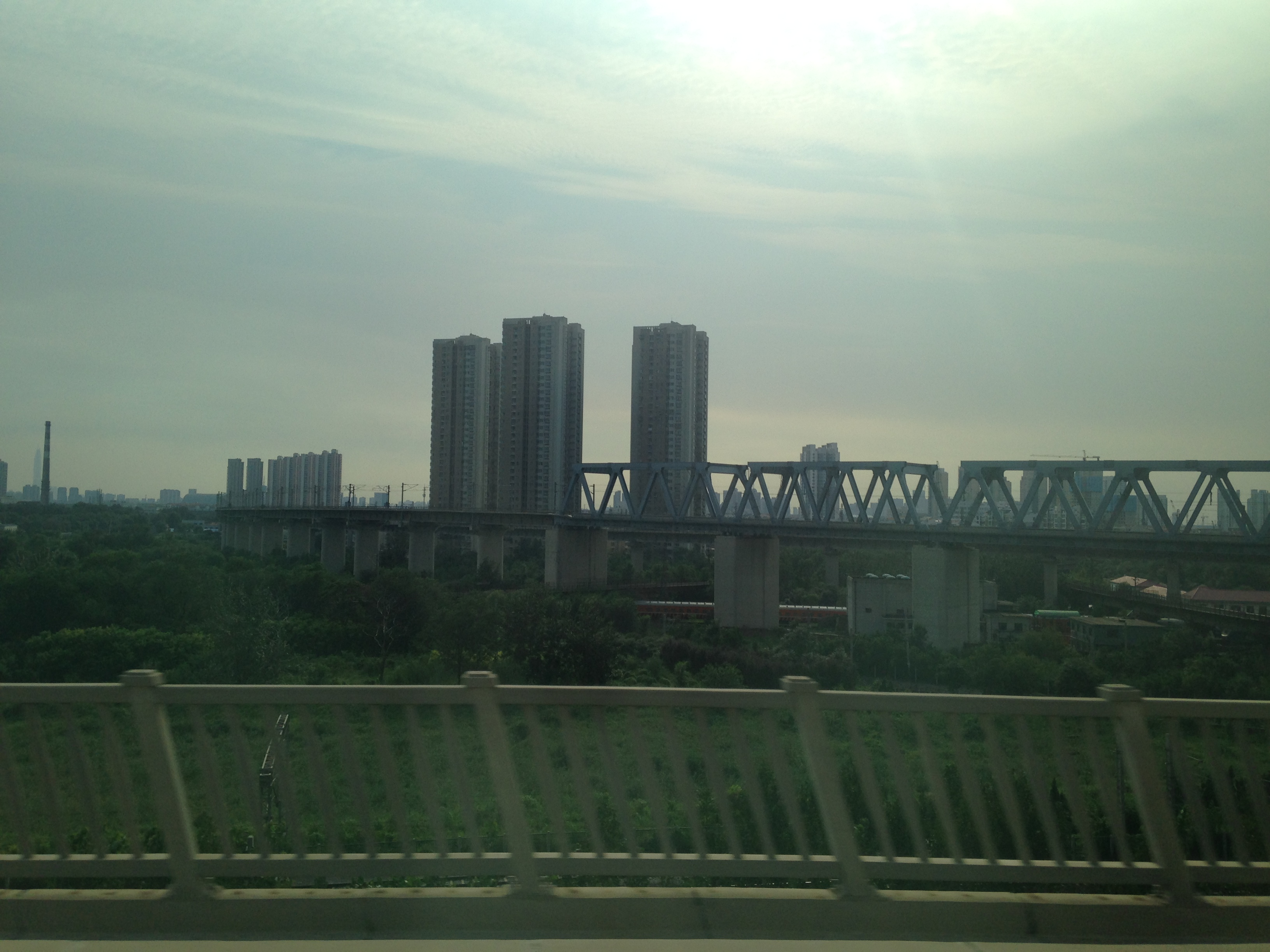
View near Tianjin North Station, 2016

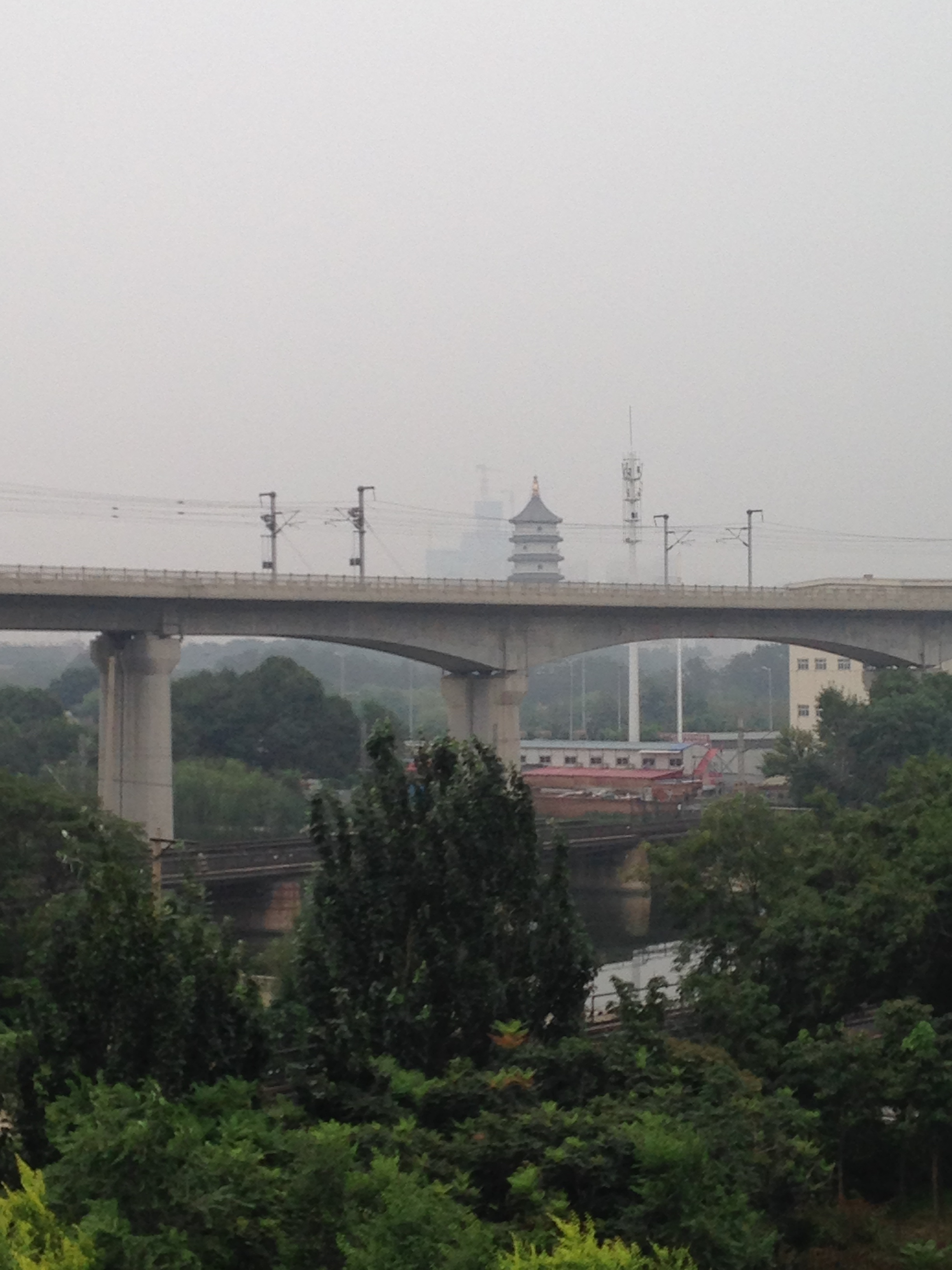
Beining Park from afar, 2016
