= Xinli Subdistrict =

Subdistrict of Tianjin, China

Xinli Subdistrict 新立街道
- Subdistrict
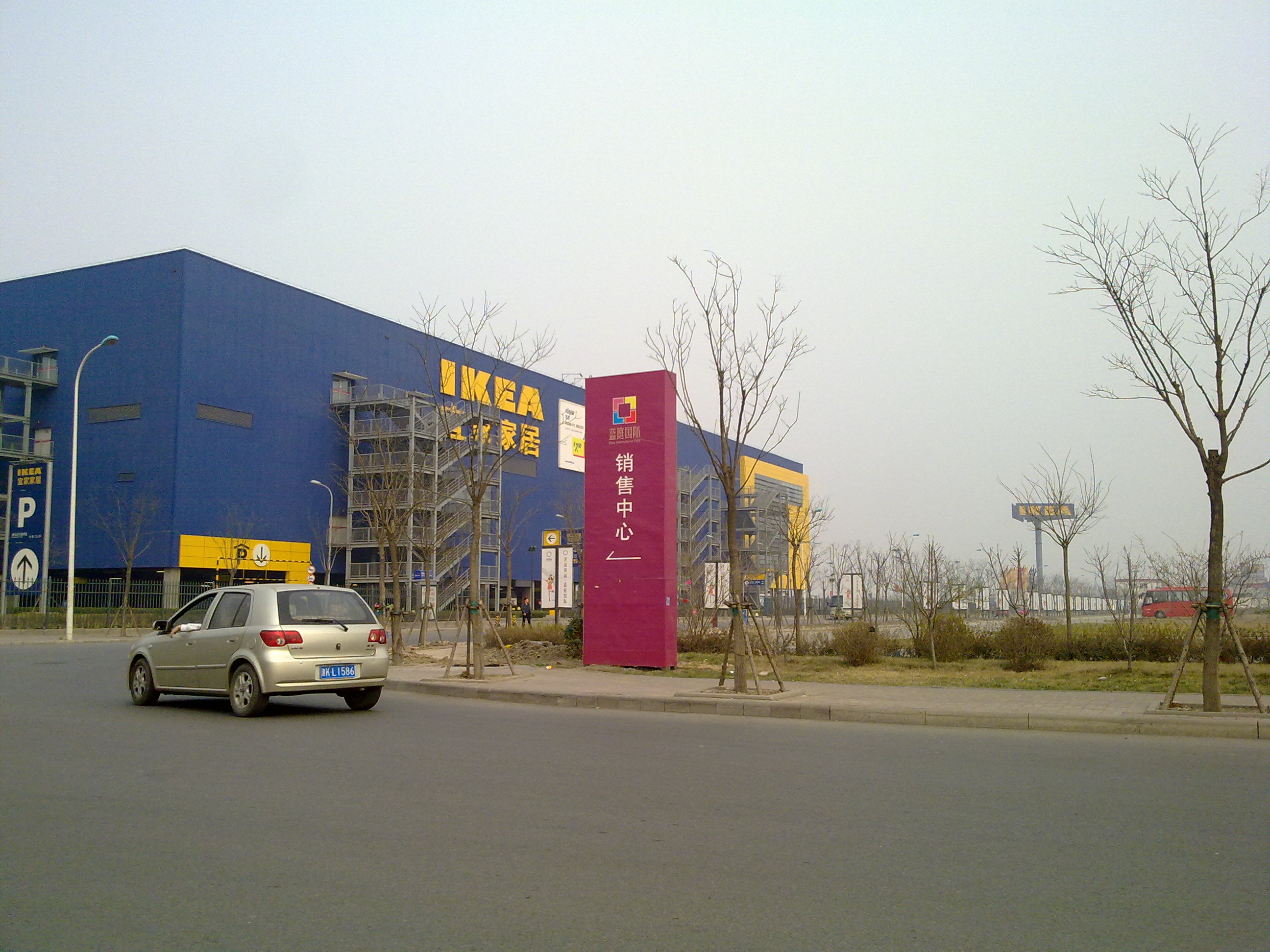
- Ikea warehouse in the subdistrict, 2014

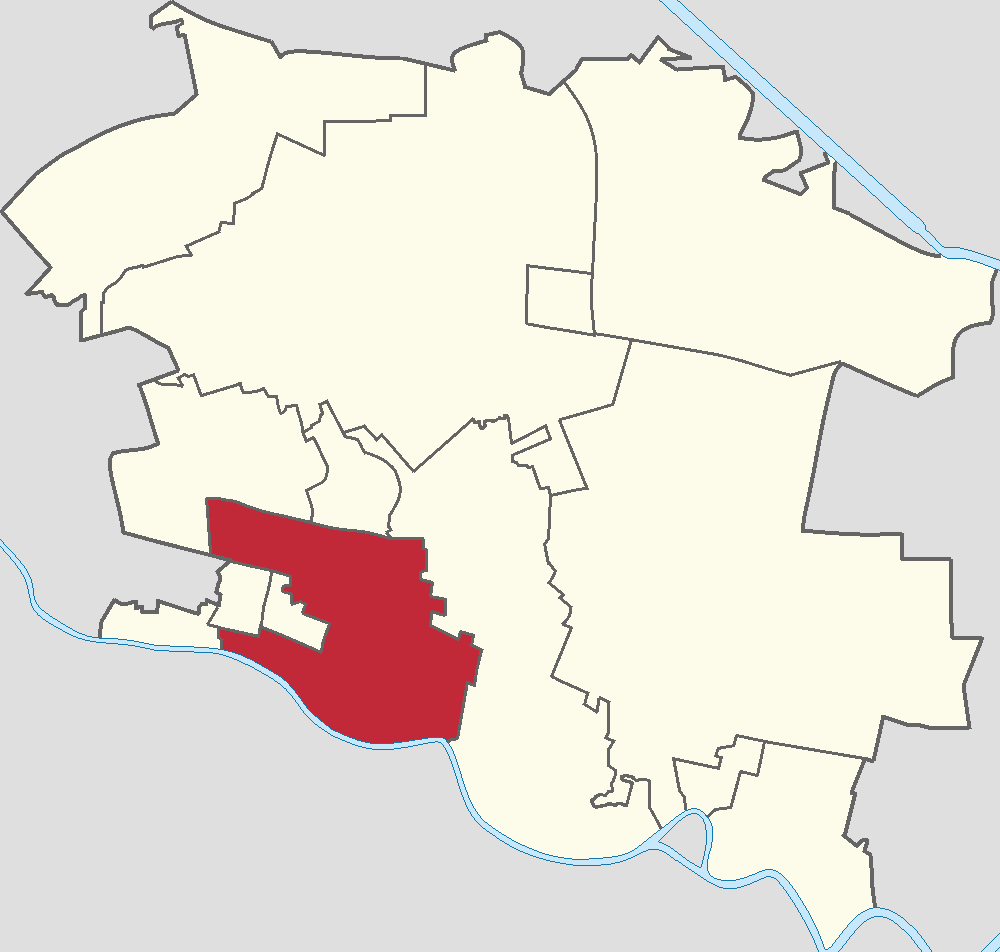
- Location in Dongli District

- Location within Tianjin Location within China
- Coordinates: 39°05′08″N 117°20′12″E
- Country: China
- Municipality: Tianjin
- District: Dongli
- Village-level Divisions: 16 communities 10 villages

Area
  - Total: 61.76 km^{2} (23.85 sq mi)
- Elevation: 4 m (13 ft)

Population (2010)
  - Total: 136,357
  - Density: 2,208/km^{2} (5,718/sq mi)
- Time zone: UTC+8 (China Standard)
- Postal code: 300300
- Area code: 022

Xinli Subdistrict (Chinese: 新立街道; pinyin: Xīnlì Jiēdào) is a subdistrict located on southern Dongli District, Tianjin, China. It borders Wanxin Subdistrict and Tianjin Aviation Logistics District to its north, Jinqiao Subdistrict to its east, Shuangqiaohe and Xianshuigu Towns to its south, Xinzhuang and Shuanggang Towns to its southwest, as well as Zhangguizhuang and Fengniancun Subdistricts to its west. In 2010, its population is 136,357.

== History ==
Timeline of Xinli Subdistrict
Year	Status	Part of
1958 - 1962	Xinlicun People's Commune	Hedong District, Tianjin
1962 - 1983	Xinlicun People's Commune; Xiaodongzhuang People's Commune	Dongjiao District, Tianjin
1983 - 1992	Xinlicun Township; Xiaodongzhuang Township	Dongjiao District, Tianjin
1992 - 1993	Xinlicun Township; Xiaodongzhuang Township	Dongli District, Tianjin
1993 - 1994	Xinli Town; Xiaodongzhuang Township	Dongli District, Tianjin
1994 - 2001	Xinli Town; Xiaodongzhuang Town	Dongli District, Tianjin
2001–present	Xinli Subdistrict	Dongli District, Tianjin

== Administrative divisions ==
By 2022, Xinli Subdistrict has 26 subdivisions, more specifically 16 residential communities and 10 villages. They are listed as follows:

Subdivision names	Name transliterations	Type
民航大学	Minhang Daxue	Community
驯海里	Xunhai Li	Community
枫景家园	Fengjing Jiayuan	Community
金隅悦园	Jinyu Yueyuan	Community
汇海里	Huihai Li	Community
格兰苑	Gelan Yuan	Community
秀欣园	Xiuxin Yuan	Community
金域华府	Jinyu Huafu	Community
新立花园	Xinli Huayuan	Community
海雅园	Haiya Yuan	Community
丽晟	Lisheng	Community
丽昕	Lixin	Community
融创	Rongchuan	Community
蓝庭	Lanting	Community
丰和	Fenghe	Community
中国民航大学	Zhongguo Minhang Daxue	Community
新立村	Xinli Cun	Village
四合庄	Sihe Zhuang	Village
中河	Zhonghe	Village
张贵庄	Zhanggui Zhuang	Village
西扬	Xiyang	Village
东扬场	Dongyang Chang	Village
邢圈	Xingquan	Village
新兴	Xinxing	Village
宝元	Baoyuan	Village
泥窝	Niwo	Village

== See also ==
- List of township-level divisions of Tianjin
