= Donglihu Subdistrict =

Subdistrict of Tianjin, China

Donglihu Subdistrict 东丽湖街道
- Subdistrict
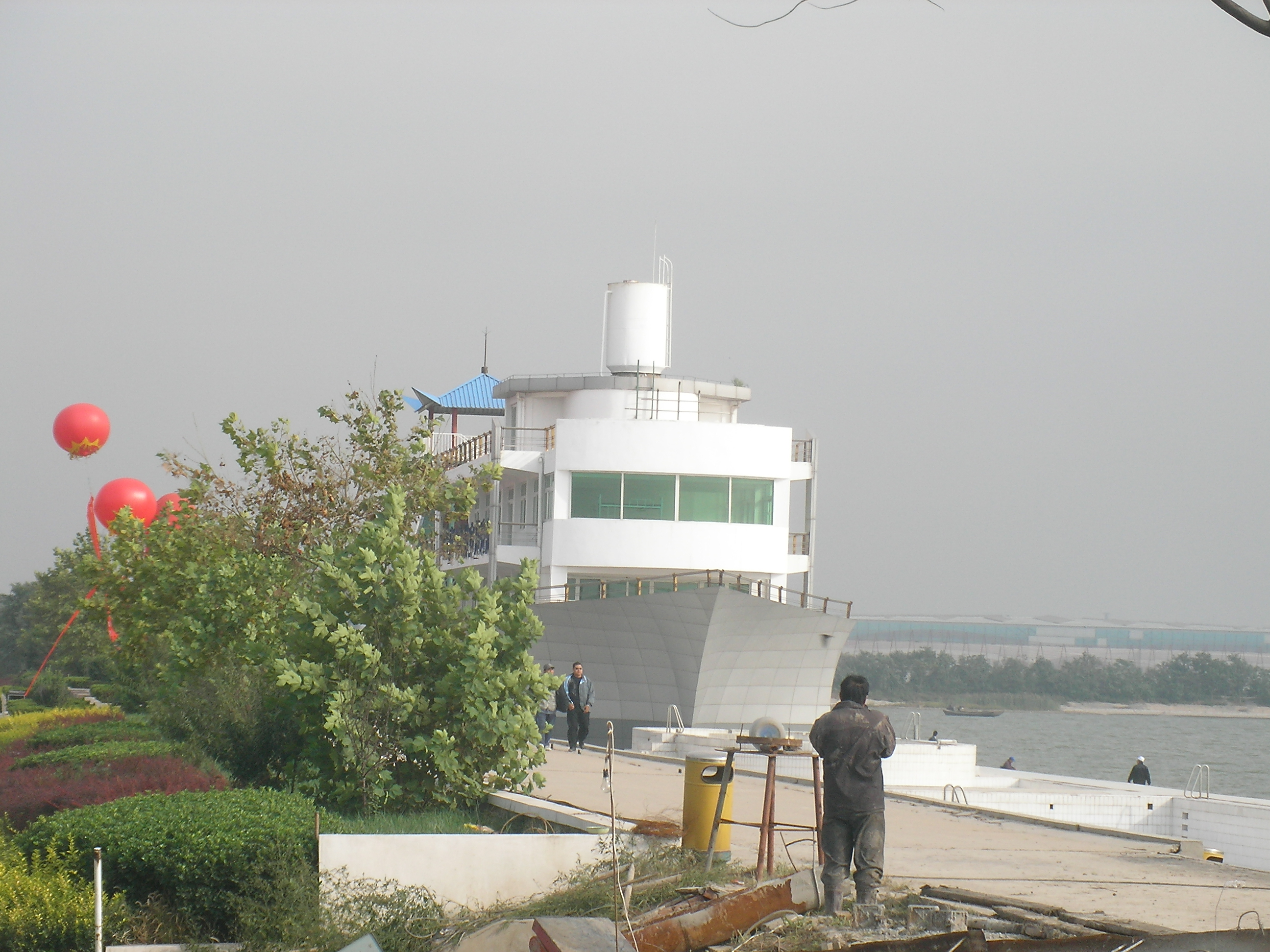
- Dongli Lake in Donghu Park, in the northeast of the subdistrict, 2007

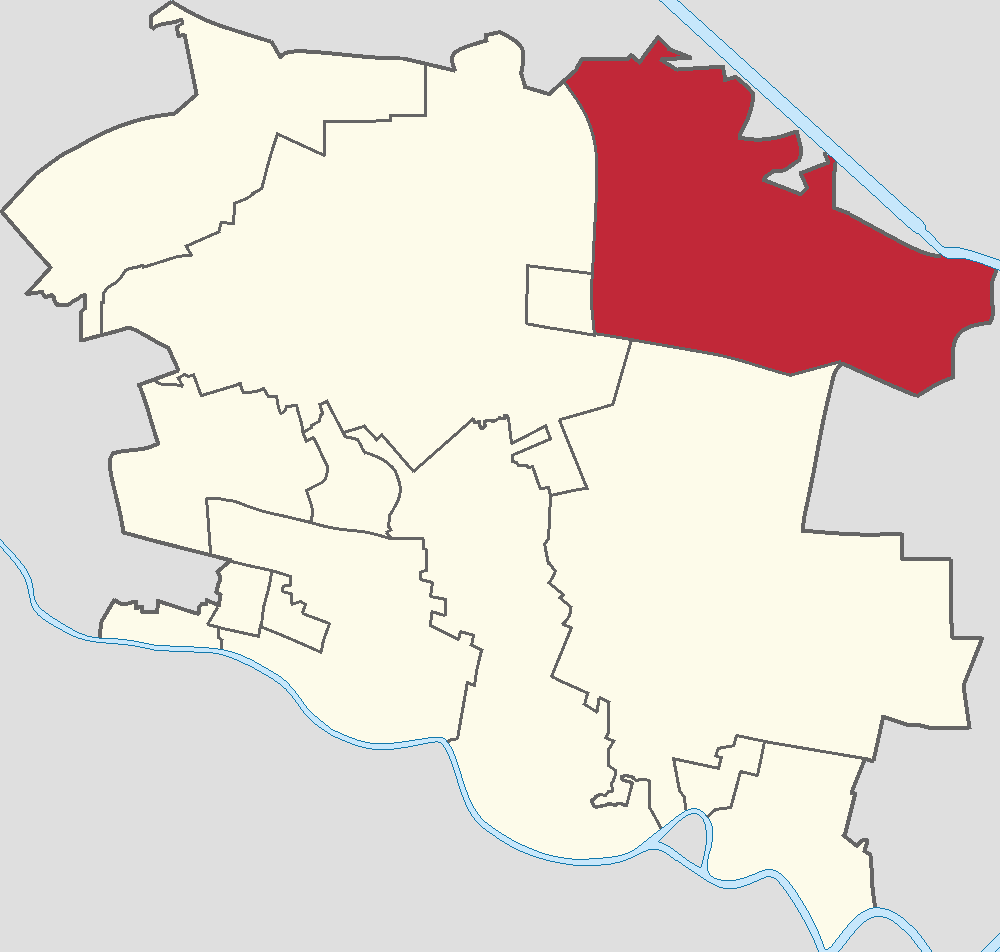
- Location of Donglihu Subdistrict in Dongli District

- Location within Tianjin Location within China
- Coordinates: 39°09′58″N 117°26′12″E
- Country: China
- Municipality: Tianjin
- District: Dongli
- Village-level Divisions: 6 communities

Area
  - Total: 54.11 km^{2} (20.89 sq mi)
- Elevation: 4 m (13 ft)

Population (2010)
  - Total: 3,650
  - Density: 67.5/km^{2} (175/sq mi)
- Time zone: UTC+8 (China Standard)
- Postal code: 300308
- Area code: 022

Donglihu Subdistrict (simplified Chinese: 东丽湖街道; traditional Chinese: 東麗湖街道; pinyin: Dōnglìhú Jiēdào) is a subdistrict within Dongli District, Tianjin, China. It borders Zaojiacheng Town in its north, Beitang Subdistrict in its east, Junliangcheng Subdistrict in its south, as well as Huaming and Huaxin Subdistricts in its west. It has 3,650 inhabitants as of 2010.

The subdistrict was created in 2013. It gets its name from Dongli Lake that is situated within it.

== Administrative divisions ==
In 2022, Donglihu Subdistrict is divided into 6 residential communities. They are listed below:

Subdivision names	Name transliterations
绿洲花园	Lüzhou Huayuan
赏湖苑	Shanghu Yuan
碧溪苑	Bixi Yuan
东湖湾	Donghu Wan
沁水苑	Xinshui Yuan
澜景雅园	Lanjing Yayuan

== See also ==
- List of township-level divisions of Tianjin
