= Wuxia Subdistrict =

Subdistrict of Tianjin, China

Wuxia Subdistrict 无瑕街道
- Subdistrict
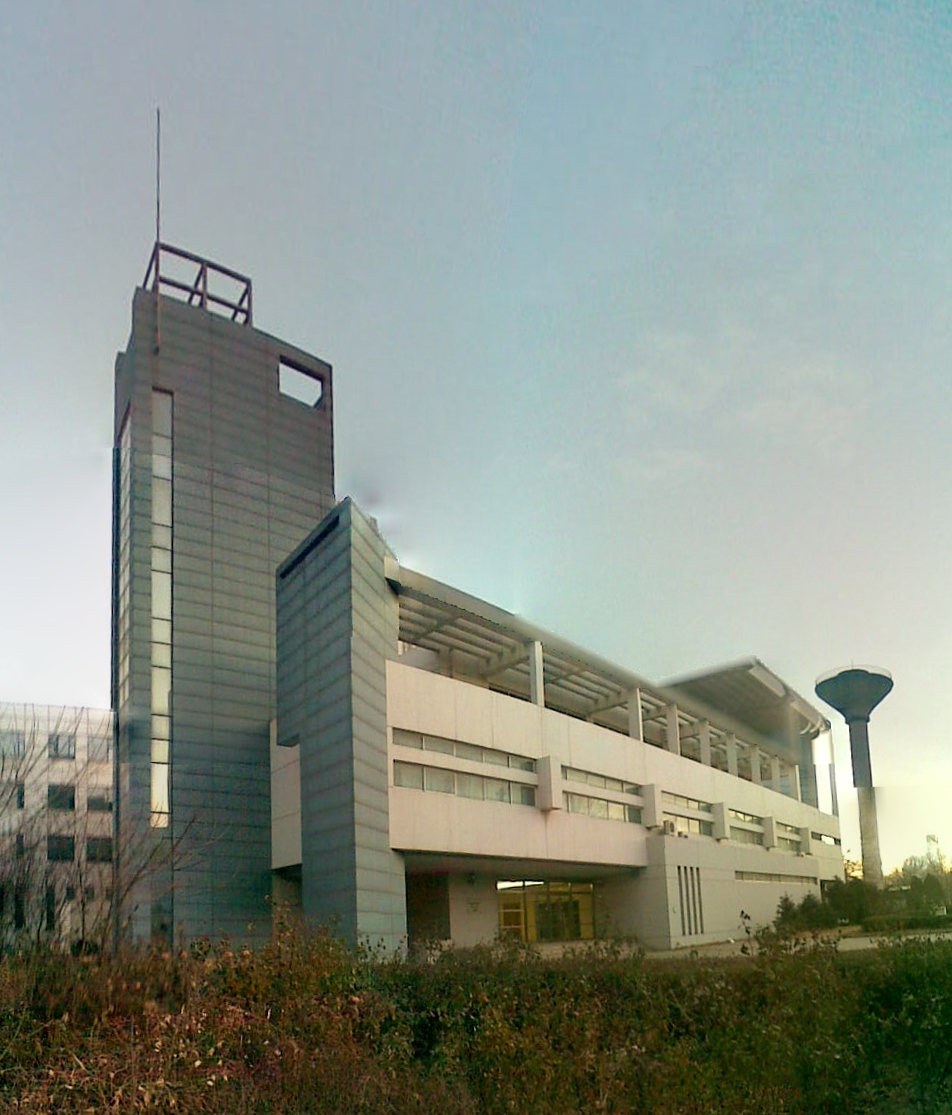
- Tianjin Pipe Co. Archive located within the subdistrict, 2010

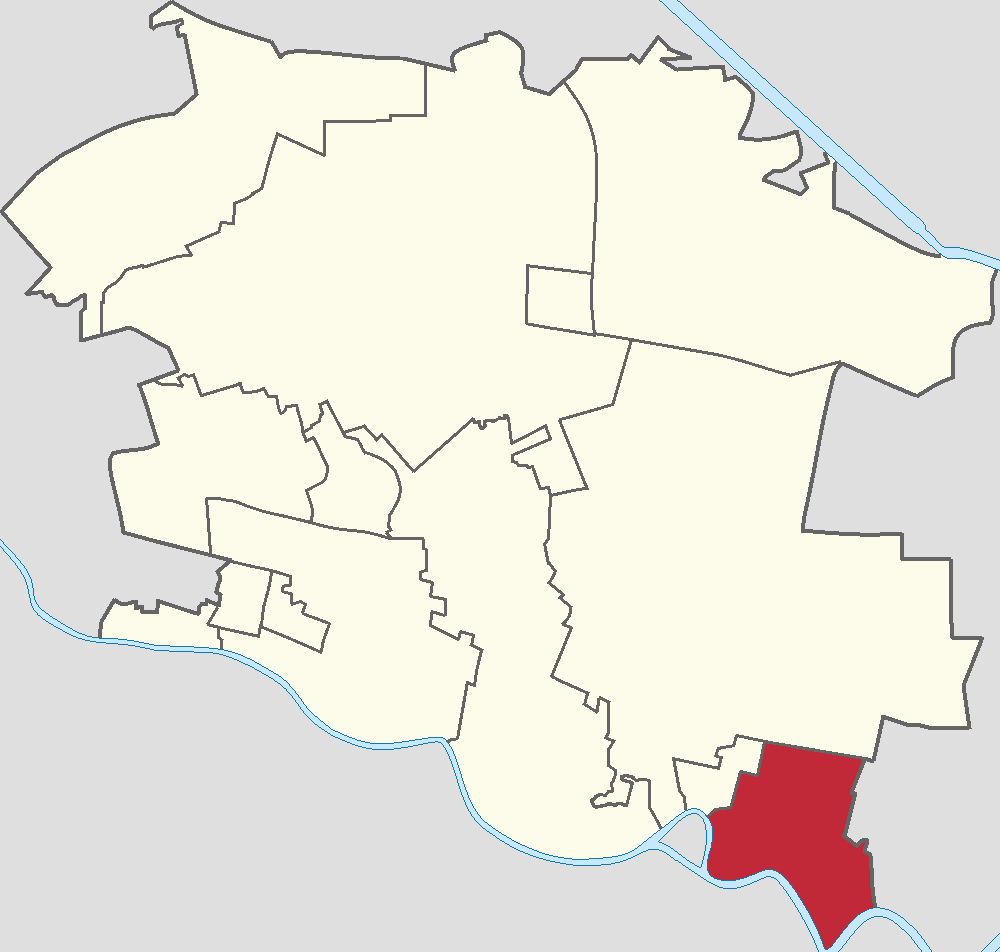
- Location inside of Dongli District

- Location within Tianjin Location within China
- Coordinates: 39°02′36″N 117°29′44″E
- Country: China
- Municipality: Tianjin
- District: Dongli
- Village-level Divisions: 5 communities

Area
  - Total: 21.74 km^{2} (8.39 sq mi)
- Elevation: 4 m (13 ft)

Population (2010)
  - Total: 54,126
  - Density: 2,490/km^{2} (6,448/sq mi)
- Time zone: UTC+8 (China Standard)
- Postal code: 300302
- Area code: 022

Wuxia Subdistrict (simplified Chinese: 无瑕街道; traditional Chinese: 無瑕街道; pinyin: Wúxiá Jiēdào) is a subdistrict located in the eastern portion of Dongli District, Tianjin, China. It is located at the south of Junliangcheng Subdistrict, west of Huajiayuan Subdistrict, north of Gegu and Shuangheqiao Towns, and east of Jinqiao Subdistrict. As of 2010, the subdistrict has a population of 54,126.

== History ==
Timeline of Wuxia's history
| Year | Status | Part of |
|---|---|---|
| 1958 - 1962 | Within Xinlicun People's Commune | Hedong District, Tianjin |
| 1962 - 1983 | Lizhuangzi People's Commune | Dongjiao District, Tianjin |
| 1983 - 1992 | Lizhuang Township | Dongjiao District, Tianjin |
| 1992 - 1993 | Lizhuangzi Township | Dongli District, Tianjin |
| 1993–present | Wuxia Subdistrict | Dongli District, Tianjin |

== Administrative divisions ==
As of 2022, Wuxia Subdistrict administers the following five residential communities:

| Subdivision names | Name transliterations |
|---|---|
| 无瑕花园 | Wuxia Huayuan |
| 圆月里 | Yuanyue Li |
| 春霞里 | Chunxia Li |
| 华盛里 | Huasheng Li |
| 秀霞里 | Xiuxia Li |

== See also ==
- List of township-level divisions of Tianjin
