= List of township-level divisions of Tianjin =

Township-level divisions of Tianjin municipality, China

Location of Tianjin Municipality in China

This is a list of township-level divisions of the municipality of Tianjin, People's Republic of China (PRC). After province, prefecture, and county-level divisions, township-level divisions constitute the formal fourth-level administrative divisions of the PRC. However, as Tianjin is a province-level municipality, the prefecture-level divisions are absent and so county-level divisions are at the second level, and township-level divisions are at the third level of administration. There are a total of 244 such divisions in Tianjin, divided into 106 subdistricts, 118 towns, 19 townships and 1 ethnic township. This list is organised by the county-level divisions of the municipality.

After re-organize of Ji County to be Jizhou District in 2016, all 16 county-level divisions of Tianjin Municipality are Districts.

== Heping District ==
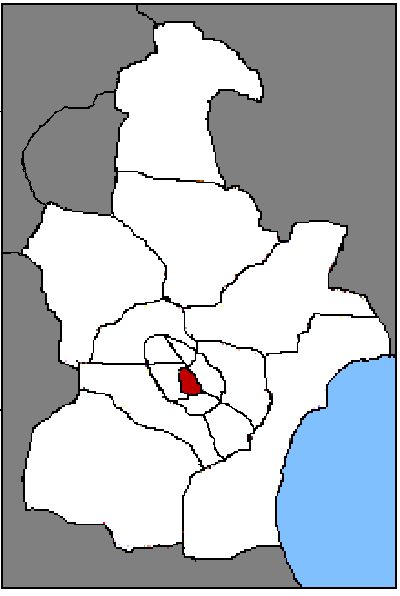
Location of Heping District in the municipality

- 6 Subdistricts: Quanyechang Subdistrict (劝业场街道), Xiaobailou Subdistrict (小白楼街道), Wudadao Subdistrict (五大道街道), Xinxing Subdistrict (新兴街道), Nanyingmen Subdistrict (南营门街道), Nanshi Subdistrict (南市街道)

== Hedong District ==
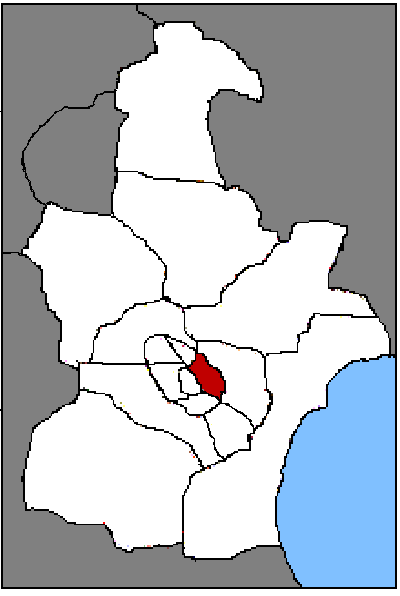
Location of Hedong District in the municipality

- 13 Subdistricts: Dawangzhuang Subdistrict (大王庄街道), Dazhigu Subdistrict (大直沽街道), Zhongshanmen Subdistrict (中山门街道), Fuminlu Subdistrict (富民路街道), Erhaoqiao Subdistrict (二号桥街道), Chunhua Subdistrict (春华街道), Tangjiakou Subdistrict (唐家口街道), Xiangyanglou Subdistrict (向阳楼街道), Changzhoudao Subdistrict (常州道街道), Shanghanglu Subdistrict (上杭路街道), Dongxin Subdistrict (东新街道), Lushandao Subdistrict (鲁山道街道), Tianjin Tiechang Subdistrict (天津铁厂街道)

Note: Tianjin Tiechang Subdistrict is an enclave located within She County of Handan, Hebei.

== Hexi District ==
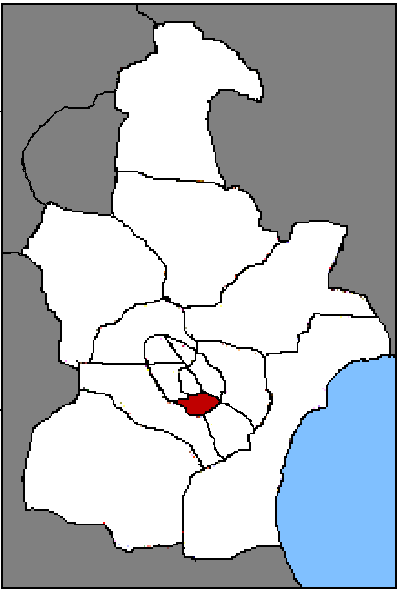
Location of Hexi District in the municipality

- 14 Subdistricts: Dayingmen Subdistrict (大营门街道), Xiawafang Subdistrict (下瓦房街道), Taoyuan Subdistrict (桃园街道), Guajiasi Subdistrict (挂甲寺街道), Machang Subdistrict (马场街道), Yuexiulu Subdistrict (越秀路街道), Youyilu Subdistrict (友谊路街道), Tianta Subdistrict (天塔街道), Jianshan Subdistrict (尖山街道), Chentangzhuang Subdistrict (陈塘庄街道), Liulin Subdistrict (柳林街道), Donghai Subdistrict (东海街道), Meijiang Subdistrict (梅江街道), Taihulu Subdistrict (太湖路街道)

== Nankai District ==
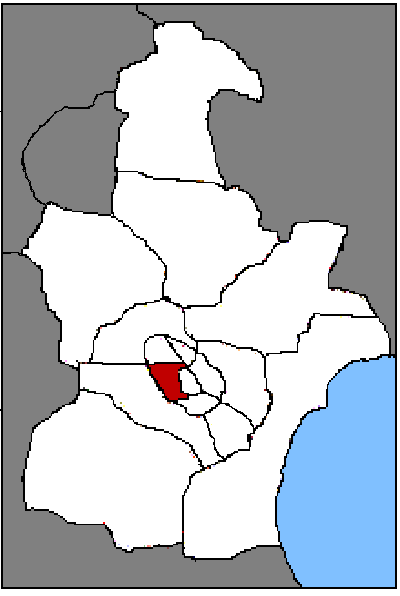
Location of Nankai District in the municipality

- 12 Subdistricts: Changhong Subdistrict (长虹街道), Gulou Subdistrict (鼓楼街道), Xingnan Subdistrict (兴南街道), Guangkai Subdistrict (广开街道), Wanxing Subdistrict (万兴街道), Xuefu Subdistrict (学府街道), Xiangyang Road Subdistrict (向阳路街道), Jialingdao Subdistrict (嘉陵道街道), Wangdingdi Subdistrict (王顶堤街道), Shuishanggongyuan Subdistrict (水上公园街道), Tiyuzhongxin Subdistrict (体育中心街道), Huayuan Subdistrict (华苑街道)

== Hebei District ==
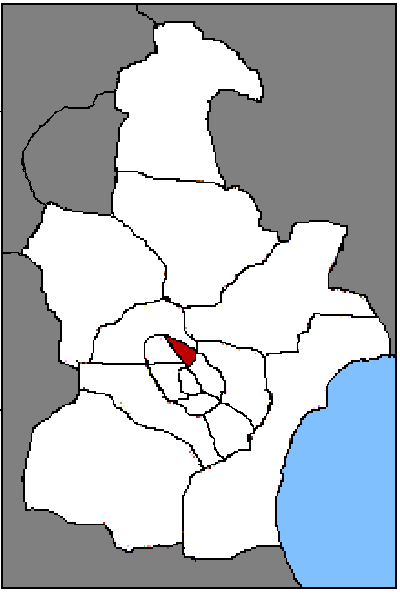
Location of Hebei District in the municipality

- 10 Subdistricts: Guangfudao Subdistrict (光复道街道), Wanghailou Subdistrict (望海楼街道), Hongshunli Subdistrict (鸿顺里街道), Xinkaihe Subdistrict (新开河街道), Tiedonglu Subdistrict (铁东路街道), Jianchangdao Subdistrict (建昌道街道), Ningyuan Subdistrict (宁园街道), Wangchuanchang Subdistrict (王串场街道), Jiangdulu Subdistrict (江都路街道), Yueyahe Subdistrict (月牙河街道)

== Hongqiao District ==
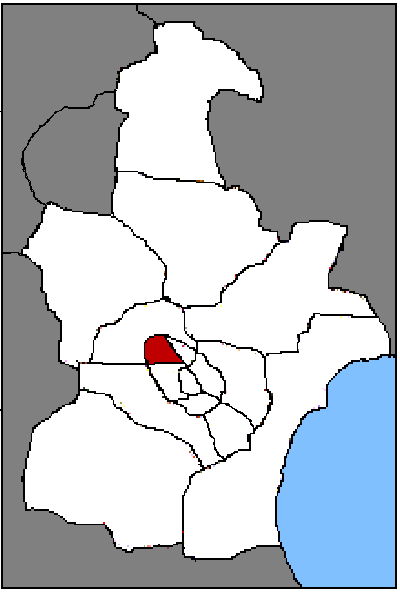
Location of Hongqiao District in the municipality

- 9 Subdistricts: Xiyuzhuang Subdistrict (西于庄街道), Xianyangbeilu Subdistrict (咸阳北路街道), Dingzigu Subdistrict (丁字沽街道), Xigu Subdistrict (西沽街道), Santiaoshi Subdistrict (三条石街道), Shaogongzhuang Subdistrict (邵公庄街道), Jieyuan Subdistrict (芥园街道), Lingdangge Subdistrict (铃铛阁街道), Heyuan Subdistrict (和苑街道)

== Dongli District ==
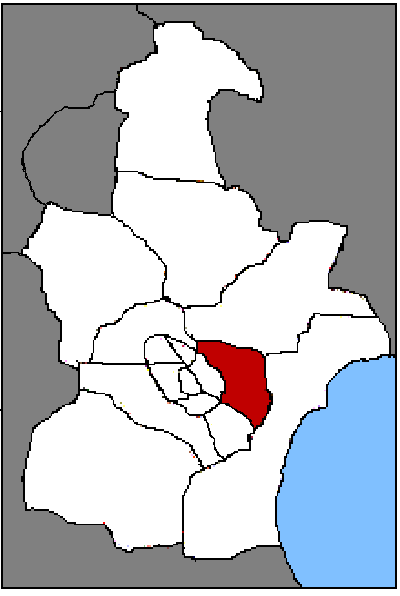
Location of Dongli District in the municipality

- 11 Subdistricts: Zhangguizhuang Subdistrict (张贵庄街道), Fengniancun Subdistrict (丰年村街道), Wanxin Subdistrict (万新街道), Wuxia Subdistrict (无瑕街道), Xinli Subdistrict (新立街道), Huaming Subdistrict (华明街道), Jinzhong Subdistrict (金钟街道), Junliangcheng Subdistrict (军粮城街道), Jinqiao Subdistrict (金桥街道), Huaxin Subdistrict (华新街道), Donglihu Subdistrict (东丽湖街道)
- 8 development zones: Tianjin Economic-Technological Development Area West Zone (天津经济技术开发区西区), Tianjin Airlines Logistics Area (天津航空物流区), Tianjin Konggang Economic Zone (天津空港经济区), Dongli District Economic and Technology Development Area (东丽区经济技术开发区), Synthesize Bonded Area (综合保税区), Hangkongxincheng (航空新城), Linkong Economic Zone of Dongli, Tianjin (天津市东丽区临空经济区), Huaming Hi-Tech Industrial Area Service Center (华明高新技术产业区服务中心)

== Xiqing District ==
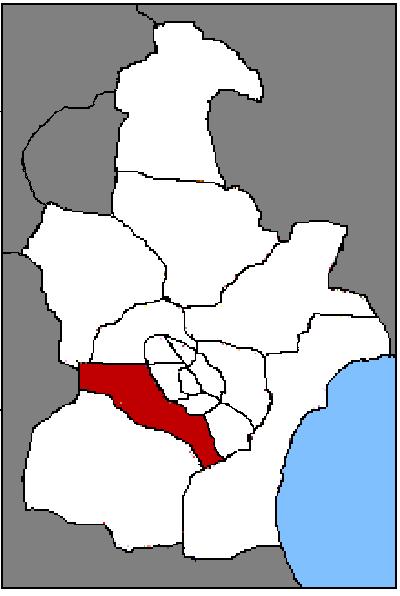
Location of Xiqing District in the municipality

- 5 Subdistricts: Xiyingmen Subdistrict (西营门街道), Liqizhuang Subdistrict (李七庄街道), Chilongnan Subdistrict (赤龙南街道), Chilongbei Subdistrict (赤龙北街道), Jinmenhu Subdistrict (津门湖街道)
- 7 Towns: Zhongbei (中北镇), Yangliuqing (杨柳青镇), Xinkou (辛口镇), Zhangjiawo (张家窝镇), Jingwu (精武镇), Dasi (大寺镇), Wangwenzhuang (王稳庄镇)
- 3 development zones: Tianjin Economic-Technological Development Area Microelectronic Rural area (天津经济技术开发区微电子小区), New Technical Industrial Park (新技术产业园区), Xiqing District Development Area (西青区开发区)

== Jinnan District ==
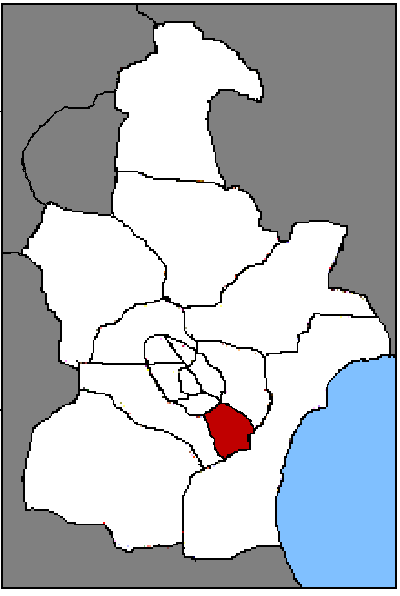
Location of Jinnan District in the municipality

- 3 Subdistricts: Shuangxin Subdistrict (双新街道), Shuanglin Subdistrict (双林街道), Haitang Subdistrict (海棠街道)
- 8 Towns: Xianshuigu (咸水沽镇), Gegu (葛沽镇), Xiaozhan (小站镇), Shuanggang (双港镇), Xinzhuang (辛庄镇), Shuangqiaohe (双桥河镇), Balitai (八里台镇), Beizhakou (北闸口镇)
- 4 development zones: Changqing Area (长青地区), Jinnan Development Area East Zone (津南开发区东区), Jinnan Development Area West Zone (津南开发区西区), Jinnan National Agriculture Park (津南国家农业园区)

== Beichen District ==
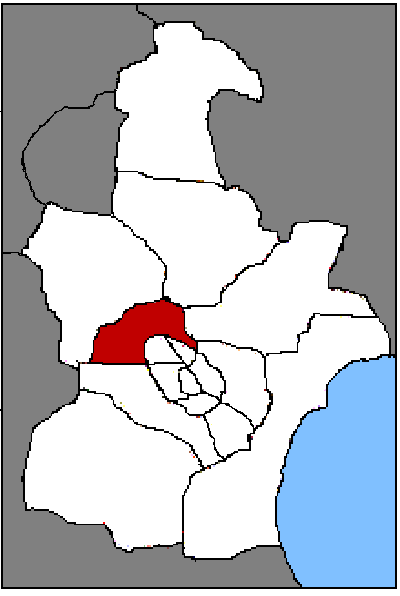
Location of Beichen District in the municipality

- 8 Subdistricts: Guoyuanxincun Subdistrict (果园新村街道), Jixianli Subdistrict (集贤里街道), Pudong Subdistrict (普东街道), Ruijing Subdistrict (瑞景街道), Jiarongli Subdistrict (佳荣里街道), Qingyuan Subdistrict (青源街道), Guangyuan Subdistrict (广源街道), Shuanghuancun Subdistrict (双环邨街道)
- 9 Towns: Tianmu (天穆镇), Beicang (北仓镇), Shuangjie (双街镇), Shuangkou (双口镇), Qingguang (青光镇), Yixingbu (宜兴埠镇), Xiaodian (小淀镇), Dazhangzhuang (大张庄镇), Xiditou (西堤头镇)
- 5 development zones: Technical Park North Zone (科技园区北区), Technical Park South Zone (科技园区南区), Tianjin Medicine and Medical Instruments Industrial Park (天津医药医疗器械工业园), Tianjin Lulugang Logistics Equip Industrial Park (天津陆路港物流装备产业园), Tianjin Wind Power Industrial Park (天津风电产业园)
- 2 farms: Hongqi Farm (红旗农场), Shuguang Farm (曙光农场)

== Wuqing District ==
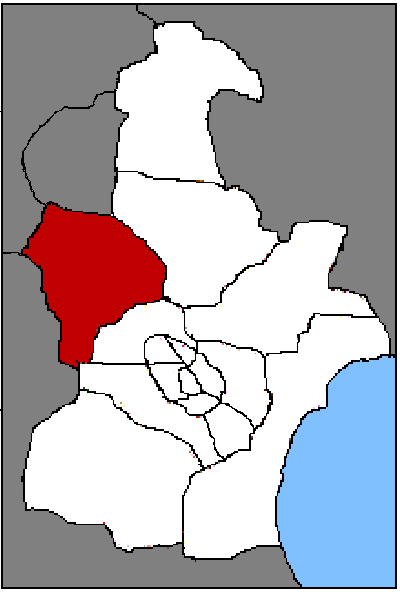
Location of Wuqing District in the municipality

- 6 Subdistricts: Yangcun Subdistrict (杨村街道), Xiazhuzhuang Subdistrict (下朱庄街道), Dongpuwa Subdistrict (东蒲洼街道), Huangzhuang Subdistrict (黄庄街道), Xuguantun Subdistrict (徐官屯街道), Yunhexi Subdistrict (运河西街道)
- 24 Towns: Meichang (梅厂镇), Dajianchang (大碱厂镇), Cuihuangkou (崔黄口镇), Daliang (大良镇), Xiawuqi (下伍旗镇), Nancaicun (南蔡村镇), Damengzhuang (大孟庄镇), Sicundian (泗村店镇), Hexiwu (河西务镇), Chengguan (城关镇), Dongmaquan (东马圈镇), Huanghuadian (黄花店镇), Shigezhuang (石各庄镇), Wangqingtuo (王庆坨镇), Chagugang (汊沽港镇), Hebeitun (河北屯镇), Shangmatai (上马台镇), Dawangguzhuang (大王古庄镇), Chenzui (陈咀镇), Douzhangzhuang (豆张庄镇), Caozili (曹子里镇), Dahuangbao (大黄堡镇), Gaocun (高村镇), Baigutun (白古屯镇)
- 7 development zones: Tianjin Economic-Technological Development Area Yixian Science Industrial Park (天津经济技术开发区逸仙科学工业园), Wuqing Economic Technological Development Area (武清经济技术开发区), Tianjin Jingbin Industrial Park (天津京滨工业园), Tianjin Jingjin E-commerce Industrial Park (天津京津电子商务产业园), Tianjin Wuqing Automobile Industrial Park (天津武清汽车产业园), Tianjin Jingjin Technical Land (天津京津科技谷), Beijing-Tianjin Gaocun Technical Innovation Park (京津高村科技创新园)

== Baodi District ==
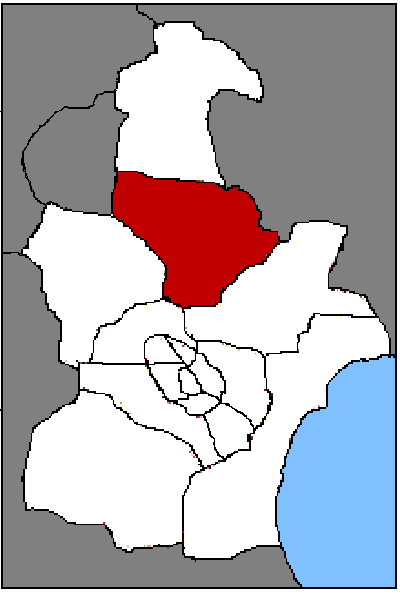
Location of Baodi District in the municipality

- 6 Subdistricts: Haibin Subdistrict (海滨街道), Baoping Subdistrict (宝平街道), Yuhua Subdistrict (钰华街道), Zhouliang Subdistrict (周良街道), Chaoyang Subdistrict (潮阳街道), Zhaoxia Subdistrict (朝霞街道)
- 18 Towns: Dakoutun (大口屯镇), Wangbuzhuang (王卜庄镇), Fangjiazhuang (方家庄镇), Lintingkou (林亭口镇), Bamencheng (八门城镇), Dazhongzhuang (大钟庄镇), Xin'an (新安镇), Huogezhuang (霍各庄镇), Xinkaikou (新开口镇), Datangzhuang (大唐庄镇), Niudaokou (牛道口镇), Shigezhuang (史各庄镇), Haogezhuang (郝各庄镇), Niujiapai (牛家牌镇), Erwangzhuang (尔王庄镇), Huangzhuang (黄庄镇), Koudong (口东镇), Dabaizhuang (大白庄镇)
- 2 development zones: Baodi Economic Development Area (宝坻经济开发区), Beijing-Tianjin Zhongguancun Technical City (京津中关村科技城)

== Binhai New Area ==
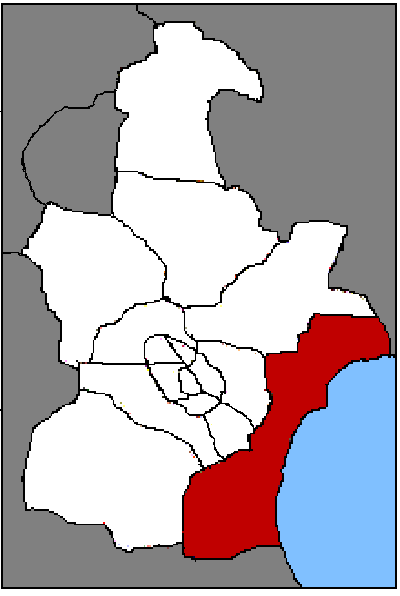
Location of Binhai New Area in the municipality

- 16 Subdistricts: Tanggu Subdistrict (塘沽街道), Hangzhoudao Subdistrict (杭州道街道), Xinhe Subdistrict (新河街道), Dagu Subdistrict (大沽街道), Xinbei Subdistrict (新北街道), Beitang Subdistrict (北塘街道), Hujiayuan Subdistrict (胡家园街道), Xingang Subdistrict (新港街道), Xincun Subdistrict (新村街道), Tianjin Economic-Technological Development Area East Zone TEDA Subdistrict (天津经济技术开发区东区泰达街道), Hangu Subdistrict (汉沽街道), Zhaishang Subdistrict (寨上街道), Chadian Subdistrict (茶淀街道), Dagang Subdistrict (大港街道), Gulin Subdistrict (古林街道), Haibin Subdistrict (海滨街道)
- 5 Towns: Xincheng (新城镇), Yangjiabo (杨家泊镇), Taiping (太平镇), Xiaowangzhuang (小王庄镇), Zhongtang (中塘镇)
- 5 development zones: Tianjin Economic-Technological Development Area (other zones) (天津经济技术开发区（其他片区）), Tianjin Port Bonded Area (天津港保税区), Tianjin Binhai New Area Hi-Tech Industrial Development Area (天津滨海新区高新技术产业开发区), Dongjiang Bonded Port Area (东疆保税港区), Sino-Singapore Tianjin Eco-city (中新天津生态城)

== Ninghe District ==
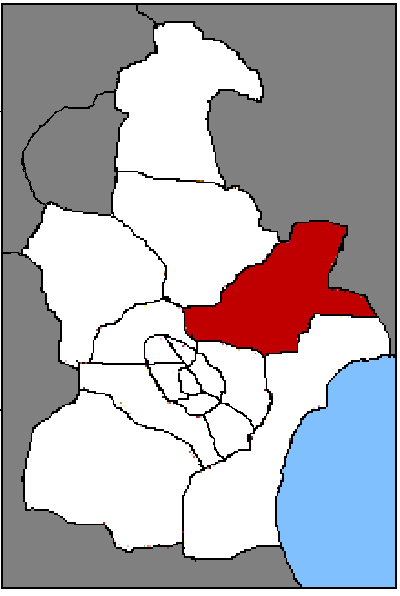
Location of Ninghe County in the municipality

- 2 Subdistricts: Lutai Subdistrict (芦台街道), Qiaobei Subdistrict (桥北街道)
- 13 Towns: Ninghe Town (宁河镇), Miaozhuang (苗庄镇), Fengtai (丰台镇), Yuelong (岳龙镇), Banqiao (板桥镇), Panzhuang (潘庄镇), Zaojiacheng (造甲城镇), Qilihai (七里海镇), Dabeijiangu (大北涧沽镇), Dongjituo (东棘坨镇), Beihuaidian (北淮淀镇), Biaokou (俵口镇), Lianzhuang (廉庄镇)
- 7 development zones: Ninghe District Commerce Development Area (宁河区贸易开发区), Ninghe District Economic Development Area (宁河区经济开发区), Tianjin Future Technical City Tianjin Economic-Technological Development Area part (天津未来科技城天津经济技术开发区片区), Tianjin Future Technical City Binhai Hi-Tech Zone part (天津未来科技城滨海高新区片区), Tianjin Future Technical City Ninghe part Modern Industrial Area regiment (天津未来科技城宁河片区现代产业区组团), Tianjin Future Technical City Ninghe part Panzhuang Industrial Area regiment (天津未来科技城宁河片区潘庄工业区组团), Tianjin Future Technical City Ninghe part Beihuaidian regiment (天津未来科技城宁河片区北淮淀组团)

== Jinghai District ==
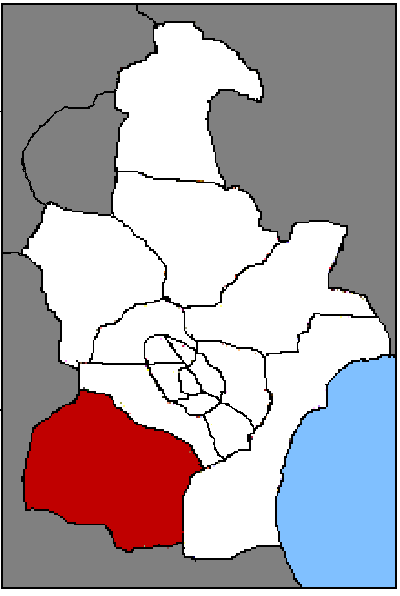
Location of Jinghai County in the municipality

- 2 Subdistricts: Huakang Subdistrict (华康街道), Chaoyang Subdistrict (朝阳街道)
- 16 Towns: Jinghai Town (静海镇), Tangguantun (唐官屯镇), Duliu (独流镇), Wangkou (王口镇), Taitou (台头镇), Ziya (子牙镇), Chenguantun (陈官屯镇), Zhongwang (中旺镇), Daqiuzhuang (大邱庄镇), Caigongzhuang (蔡公庄镇), Liangtou (梁头镇), Tuanbo (团泊镇), Shuangtang (双塘镇), Dafengdui (大丰堆镇), Yanzhuang (沿庄镇), Xizhaizhuang (西翟庄镇)
- 2 Townships: Liangwangzhuang Township (良王庄乡), Yangchengzhuang Township (杨成庄乡)
- 3 development zones: Hi-Tech Industrial Park (高新产业园), Tianjin Ziya Economic Development Area (天津子牙经济技术开发区), Tianjin Healthcare Industrial International Cooperation Demonstration Area (天津健康产业国际合作示范区)

== Jizhou District ==
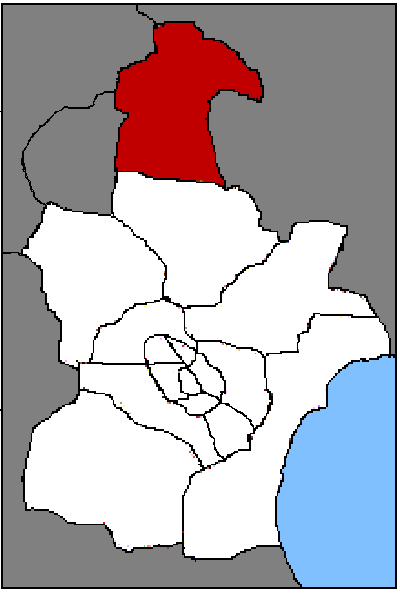
Location of Ji County in the municipality

- One Subdistrict: Wenchang Subdistrict (文昌街道)
- Towns: Yuyang (渔阳镇), Yinliu (洇溜镇), Guanzhuang (官庄镇), Mashenqiao (马伸桥镇), Xiaying (下营镇), Bangjun (邦均镇), Bieshan (别山镇), Youguzhuang (尤古庄镇), Shangcang (上仓镇), Xiacang (下仓镇), Luozhuangzi (罗庄子镇), Baijian (白涧镇), Houjiaying (侯家营镇), Sangzi (桑梓镇), Dongshigu (东施古镇), Xiawotou (下窝头镇), Yangjinzhuang (杨津庄镇), Chutouling (出头岭镇), Xilonghuyu (西龙虎峪镇), Chuanfangyu (穿芳峪镇), Dong'erying (东二营镇), Xujiatai (许家台镇), Limingzhuang (礼明庄镇), Dongzhaogezhuang (东赵各庄镇), Zhouhewan (洲河湾镇)
- One Ethnic Township: Sungezhuang Manchu Ethnic Township (孙各庄满族乡)
- One development zone: Economic Development Zone of Jizhou, Tianjin (天津市蓟州区经济开发区)
