= Jinzhong Subdistrict, Tianjin =

Subdistrict of Tianjin, China

Jinzhong Subdistrict 金钟街道
- Subdistrict
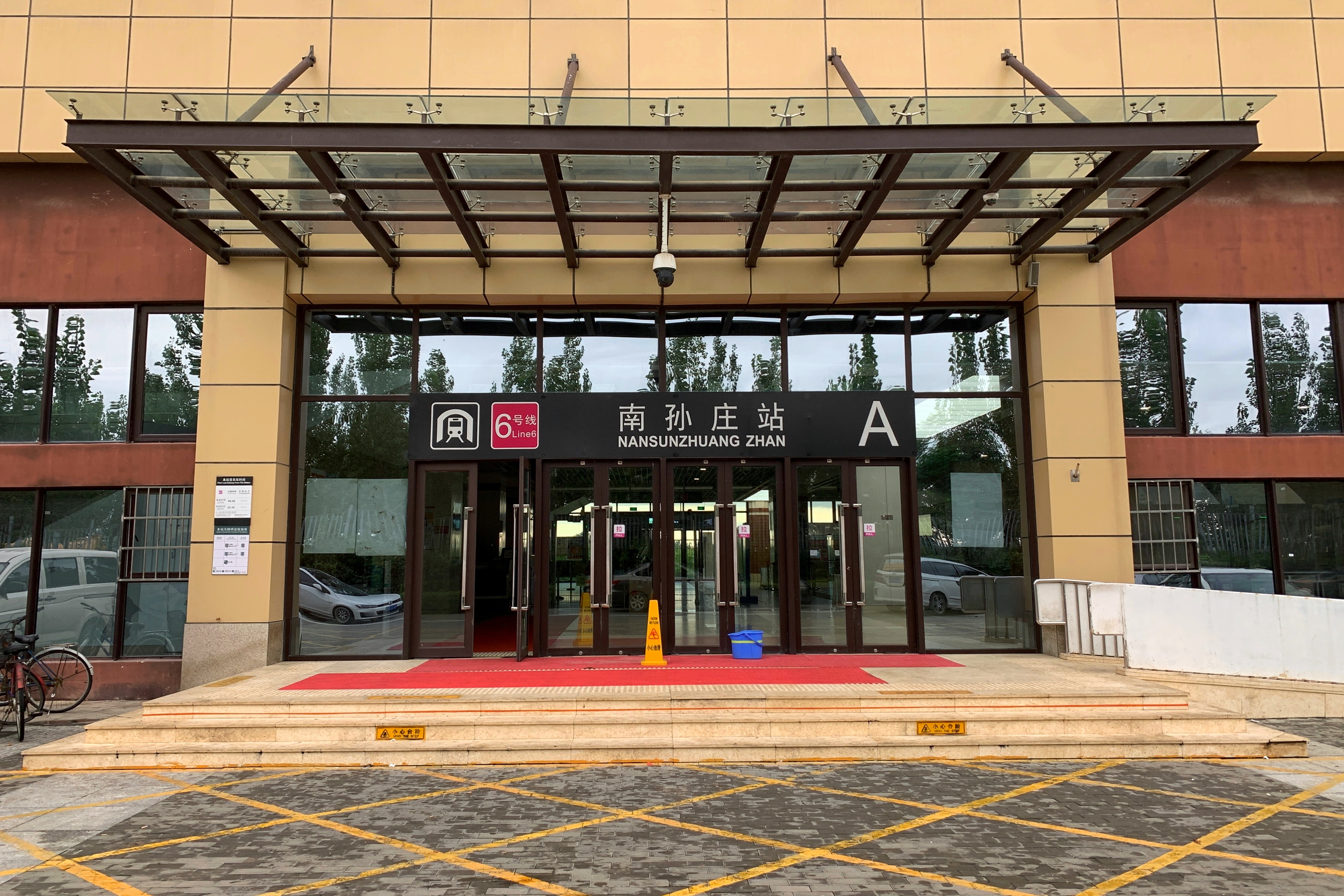
- Nansunzhuang Station on the east of the subdistrict, 2021

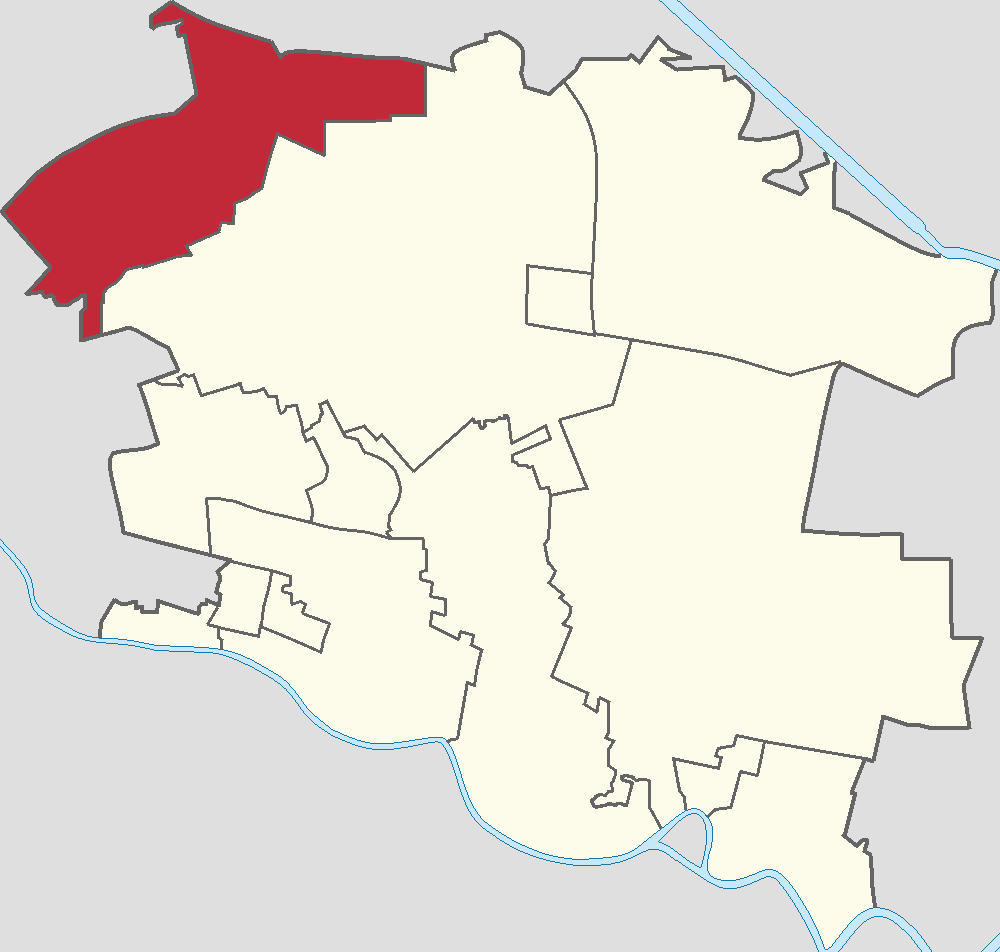
- Location of Jinzhong Subdistrict within Dongli District

- Location within Tianjin Location within China
- Coordinates: 39°12′09″N 117°16′21″E
- Country: China
- Municipality: Tianjin
- District: Dongli
- Village-level Divisions: 11 communities

Area
  - Total: 43.04 km^{2} (16.62 sq mi)
- Elevation: 4 m (13 ft)

Population (2010)
  - Total: 73,732
  - Density: 1,713/km^{2} (4,437/sq mi)
- Time zone: UTC+8 (China Standard)
- Postal code: 300251
- Area code: 022

Jinzhong Subdistrict (simplified Chinese: 金钟街道; traditional Chinese: 金鐘街道; pinyin: Jīnzhōng Jiēdào) is a subdistrict in the northwestern part of Dongli District, Tianjin, China. It borders Xiditou Town in the north, Huaming Subdistrict in the southeast, Jianchang Avenue and Yueyahe Subdistricts in the southwest, as well as Xiaodian and Yixingbu Towns in the west. As of 2010, it has 73,732 inhabitants under its administration.

The subdistrict's name Jinzhong (Chinese: 金钟) literally means "Golden Bell".

== History ==
Timetable of Jinzhong Subdistrict
Year	Status	Part of
1958 - 1963	Within Xingdian People's Commune	Hebei District, Tianjin
1963 - 1983	Dabizhuang People's Commune	Dongjiao District, Tianjin
1983 - 1992	Dabizhuang Township	Dongjiao District, Tianjin
1992 - 1993	Dabizhuang Township	Dongli District, Tianjin
1993 - 2008	Dabizhuang Town	Dongli District, Tianjin
2008 - present	Jinzhong Subdistrict	Dongli District, Tianjin

== Administrative divisions ==
In 2022, Jinzhong Subdistrict consists of 11 residential communities. They are listed as follows:

Subdivision names	Name transliterations
溪水湾	Xishui Wan
德翔里	Dexiang Li
德锦里	Dejin Li
悦和里	Yuehe Li
轩和里	Xuanhe Li
瑞和里	Ruihe Li
新城	Xincheng
金河家园	Jinhe Jiayuan
温泉公寓	Wenquan Gongyu
新中园	Xinzhong Yuan
赵沽里	Zhaogu Li

== See also ==
- List of township-level divisions of Tianjin
