= Santiaoshi Subdistrict =

Santiaoshi Subdistrict 三条石街道
- Subdistrict
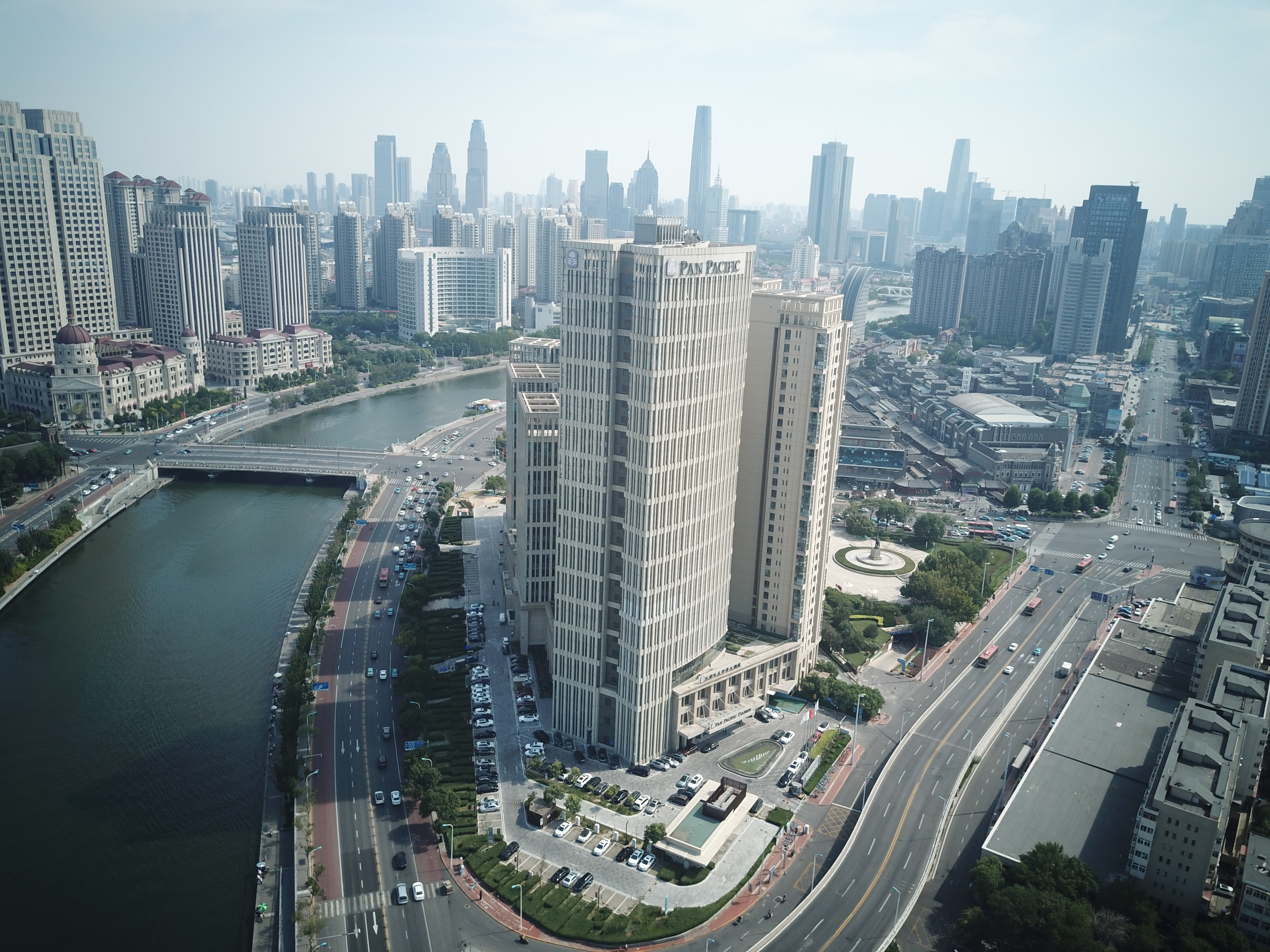
- Aerial view of the subdistrict along the Hai River, 2019

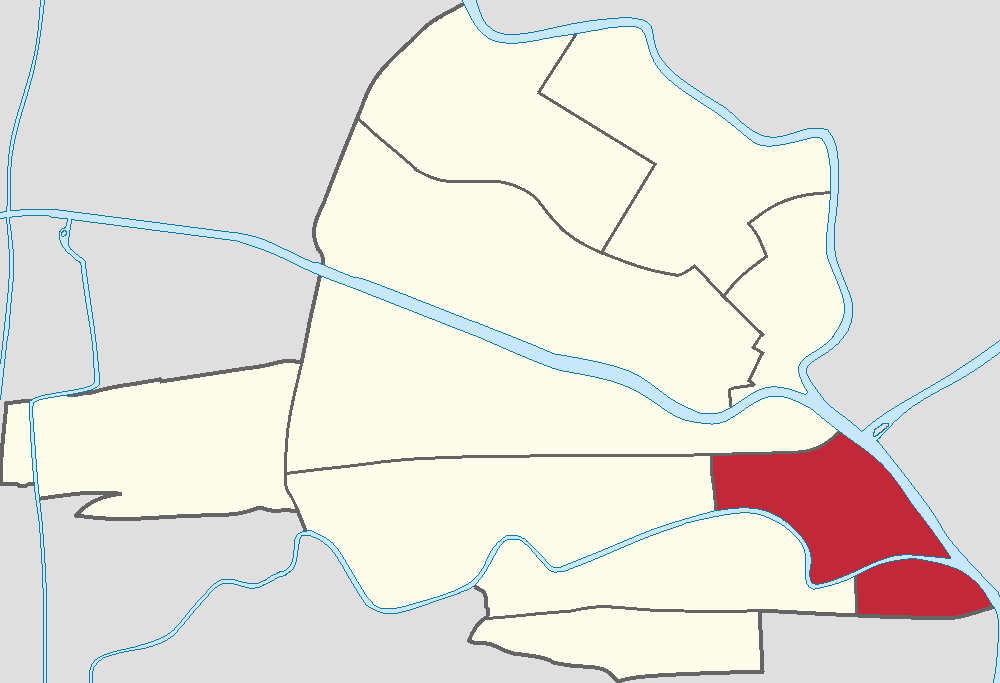
- Location of Santiaoshi Subdistrict in Hongqiao District

- Location within Tianjin Location within China
- Coordinates: 39°09′11″N 117°09′52″E
- Country: China
- Municipality: Tianjin
- District: Hongqiao
- Village-level Divisions: 8 communities

Area
  - Total: 1.41 km^{2} (0.54 sq mi)
- Elevation: 8 m (26 ft)

Population (2010)
  - Total: 19,255
  - Density: 13,700/km^{2} (35,400/sq mi)
- Time zone: UTC+8 (China Standard)
- Postal code: 300123
- Area code: 022

Santiaoshi Subdistrict (simplified Chinese: 三条石街道; traditional Chinese: 三條石街道; pinyin: Sāntiáoshí Jiēdào) is a subdistrict in southeastern Hongqiao District, Tianjin, China. It shares border with Xigu and Xinkaihe Subdistricts in its north, Hongshunli Subdistrict in its east, Gulou and Jieyuan Subdistricts in its south, and Shaogongzhuang Subdistrict in its west. Its population was 19,255 in 2010.

In 1870, the then Viceroy of Zhili Li Hongzhang paved a local street with 3 rows of limestone for his wife's funeral procession. The area was named Santaioshi (Chinese: 三条石; lit. 'Three Row Stones') as a result.

== Geography ==
Santiaoshi subdistrict is on the west of the Hai River, and is bypassed by Nanyun River.

== History ==
Timeline of Santiaoshi Subdistrict
Year	Status	Belong to
1949 - 1954	Santiaoshi Street	8th District, Tianjin
1954 - 1956	Santiaoshi Street; Hebei Subdistrict	8th District, Tianjin
1956 - 1966	Santiaoshi Subdistrict; Hebei Subdistrict	Hongqiao District, Tianjin
1966 - 1968	Santiaoshi Subdistrict; Hebei Subdistrict	Hongwei District, Tianjin
1968 - 1998	Santiaoshi Subdistrict; Hebei Subdistrict	Hongqiao District, Tianjin
1998–present	Santiaoshi Subdistrict (Incorporated Dahutong Subdistrict in 2019)	Hongqiao District, Tianjin

== Administrative divisions ==
In the year 2021, Santiaoshi Subdistrict oversaw 8 residential communities. They are listed in the table below:

Subdivision names	Name transliterations
大丰东	Dafengdong
御河湾	Yuhewan
北开花园	Beikai Huayuan
千吉花园	Qianji Huayuan
尚都家园	Shangdu Jiayuan
金领国际	Jinling Guoji
大胡同	Dahutong
海河华鼎	Haihe Huading

== See also ==
- List of township-level divisions of Tianjin
