= Huaming Subdistrict =

Subdistrict of Tianjin, China

Huaming Subdistrict 华明街道
- Subdistrict
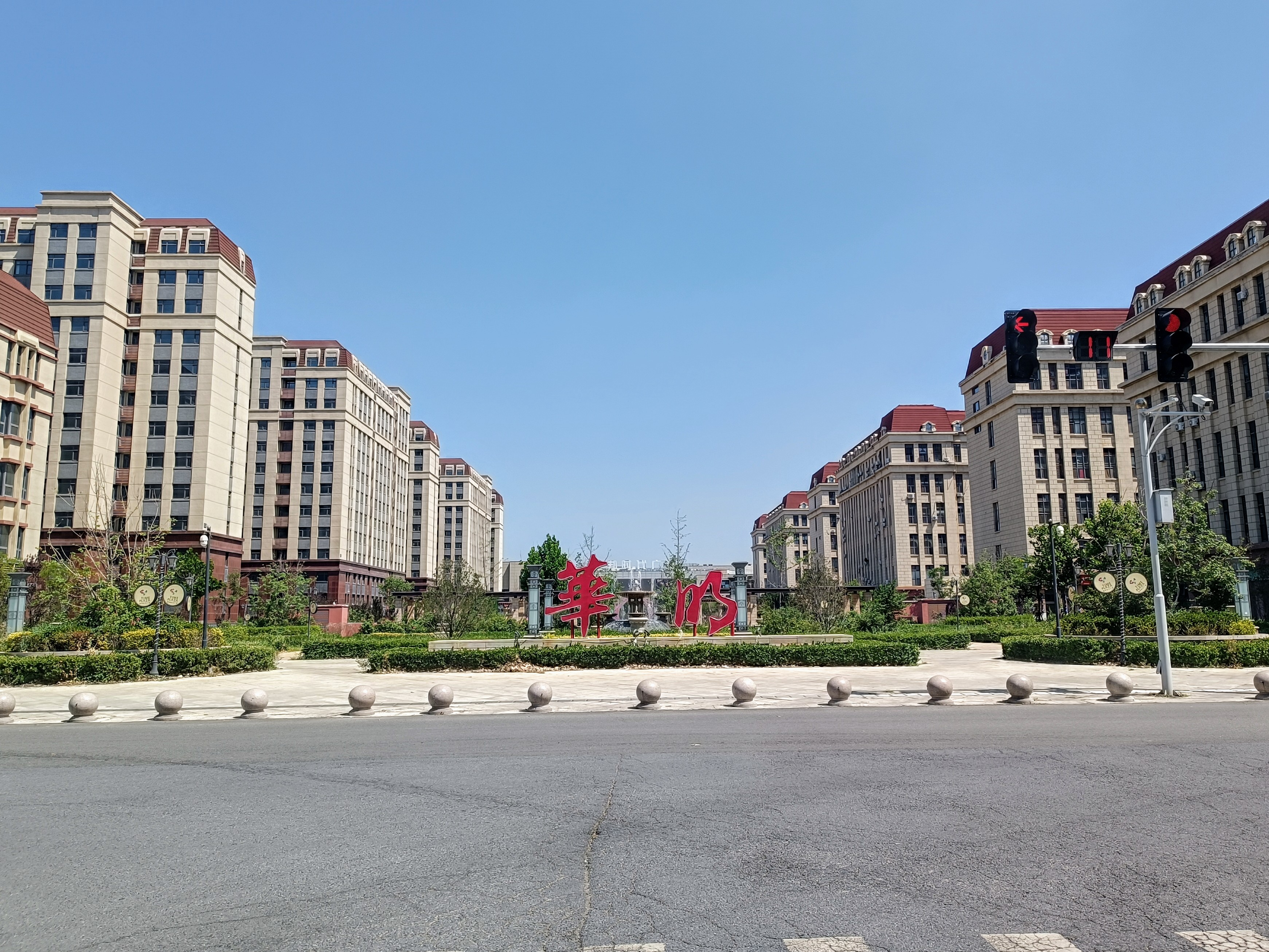

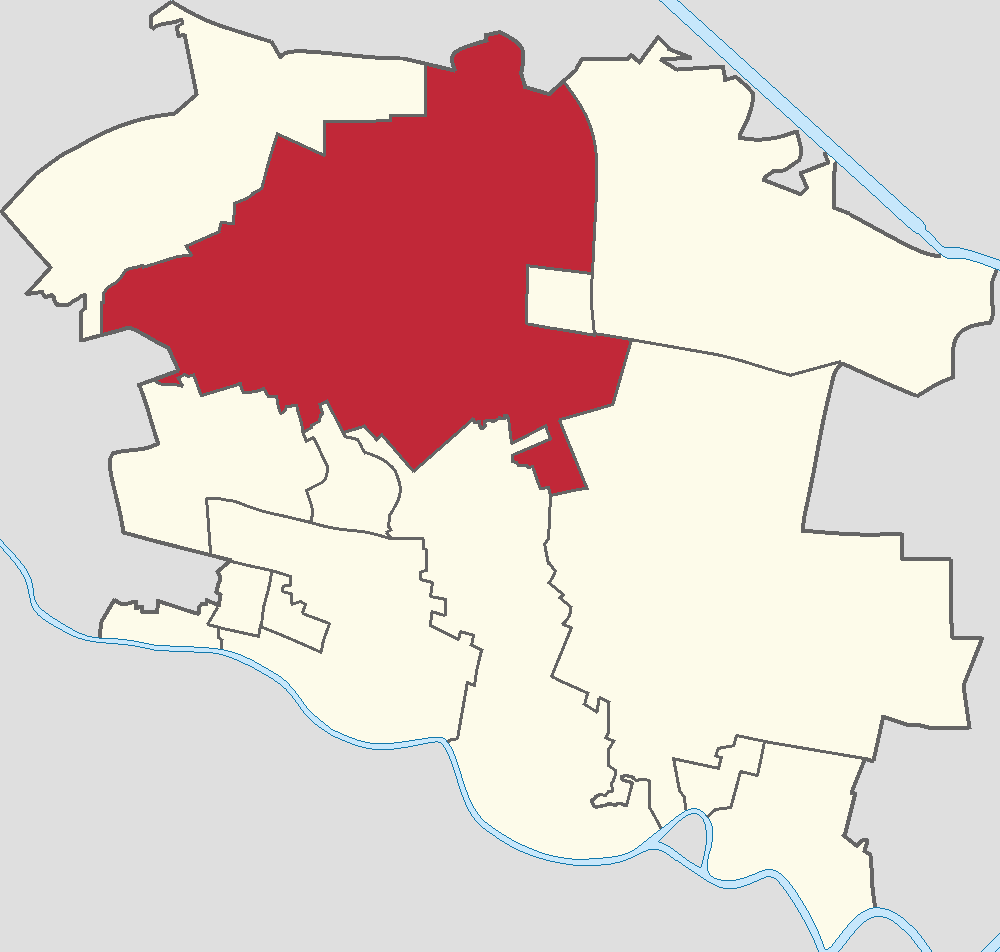
- Location of within Dongli District

- Location within Tianjin Location within China
- Coordinates: 39°10′02″N 117°23′11″E
- Country: China
- Municipality: Tianjin
- District: Dongli
- Village-level Divisions: 18 communities 1 villages

Area
  - Total: 103.6 km^{2} (40.0 sq mi)
- Elevation: 4 m (13 ft)

Population (2010)
  - Total: 64,138
  - Density: 619.1/km^{2} (1,603/sq mi)
- Time zone: UTC+8 (China Standard)
- Postal code: 300308
- Area code: 022

Huaming Subdistrict (simplified Chinese: 华明街道; traditional Chinese: 華明街道; pinyin: Huámíng Jiēdào) is a subdistrict situated in the north side of Dongli District, Tianjin, China. It shares border with Xiditou and Zaojiacheng Towns in its north, Donglihu and Huaxin Subdistricts in its east, Junliangcheng and Jinqiao Subdistricts in its southeast, Tianjin Aviation Logistics District and Wanxin Subdistrict in its south, Lushan Avenue and Changzhou Avenue Subdistricts in its southwest, as well as Jinzhong and Yueyahe Subdistricts in its west. According to the result of the 2010 Chinese Census, its population is 64,138.

Its name Huaming can be literally translated as "Brilliant and Bright"

== History ==
History of Huaming Subdistrict
Year	Status	Under
1958 - 1962	Administered by Xinlicun People's Commune	Hedong District, Tianjin
1962 - 1983	Huangcaoduo People's Commune Chitu People's Commune	Dongjiao District, Tianjin
1983 - 1992	Huangcaoduo Township Chitu Township	Dongjiao District, Tianjin
1992 - 1994	Huangcaoduo Township Chitu Town	Dongli District
1994 - 2001	Huaming Town Chitu Town	Dongli District
2001 - 2006	Huaming Town	Dongli District
2006–present	Huaming Subdistrict	Dongli District

== Administrative divisions ==
By the end of 2022, Huaming Subdistrict consists of 19 subdivisions, in which 18 are residential communities and 1 is a village. They are listed in the order of their Administrative Division Codes as follows:

Subdivision names	Name transliterations	Type
华明第一	Huaming Diyi	Community
华明第二	Huaming Di'er	Community
华明第三	Huaming Disan	Community
华明第四	Huaming Disi	Community
华明第五	Huaming Diwu	Community
华明第六	Huaming Diliu	Community
华明第七	Huaming Diqi	Community
秋悦家园	Qiuyue Jiayuan	Community
金泰丽湾	Jintai Liwan	Community
明旭	Mingxu	Community
华明第八	Huaming Diba	Community
茗润轩	Mingrun Xuan	Community
雪优花园	Xueyou Huayuan	Community
明珠	Mingzhu	Community
昆俞	Kunyu	Community
惠泽	Huize	Community
唐雅苑	Tangya Yuan	Community
茂泽	Maoze	Community
南坨	Nantuo	Village

== See also ==
- List of township-level divisions of Tianjin
