= Huaxin Subdistrict =

Subdistrict of Tianjin, China

Huaxin Subdistrict 华新街道
- Subdistrict
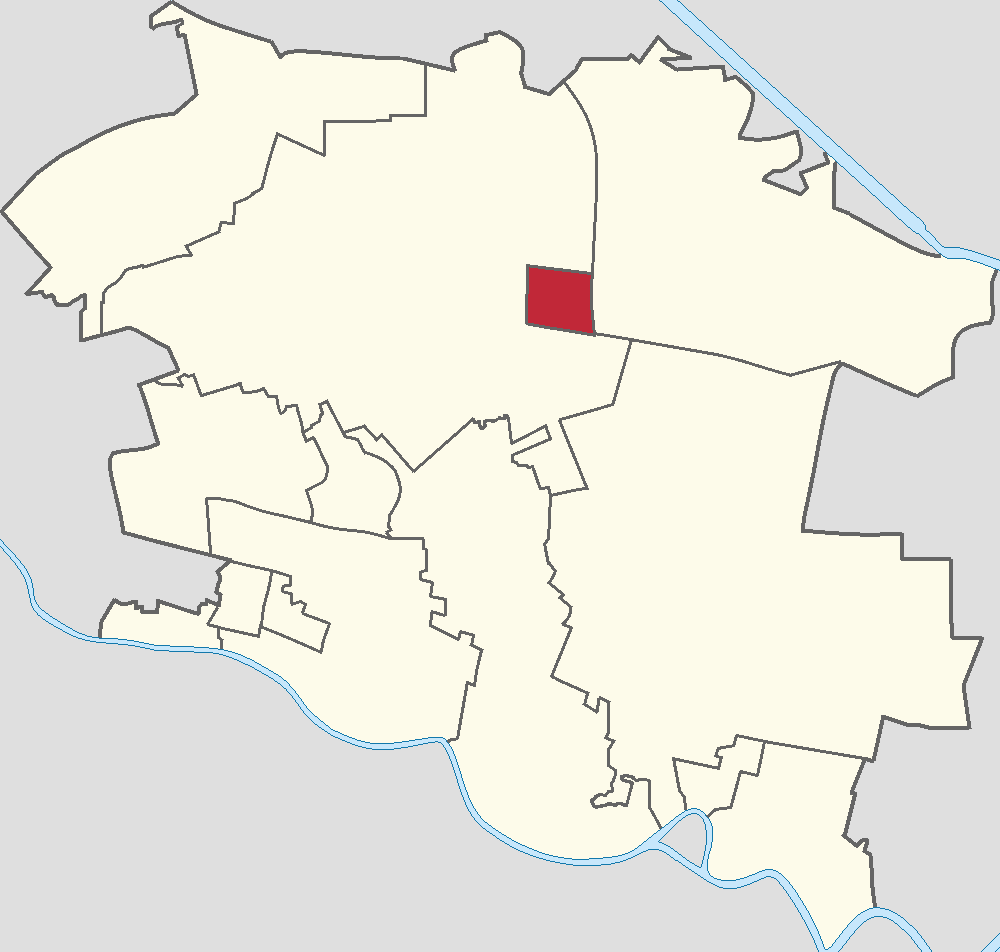
- Location within Dongli District

- Location within Tianjin Location within China
- Coordinates: 39°10′05″N 117°24′47″E
- Country: China
- Municipality: Tianjin
- District: Dongli
- Village-level Divisions: 5 communities
- Elevation: 4 m (13 ft)
- Time zone: UTC+8 (China Standard)
- Postal code: 300308
- Area code: 022

Huaxin Subdistrict (simplified Chinese: 华新街道; traditional Chinese: 華新街道; pinyin: Huáxīn Jiēdào) is a subdistrict located in the northern portion of Dongli District, Tianjin, China. It is situated in the east of Huaming Subdistrict and west of Donglihu Subdistrict.

The subdistrict was first established as Huaming Xinjiayuan Subdistrict on December 27, 2013. In the following year its name was abbreviated to Huaxin Subdistrict.

== Administrative divisions ==
By 2022, Huaxin Subdistrict oversees 5 residential communities. They are listed as follows:

Subdivision names	Name transliterations
顶秀欣园	Xiuding Xinyuan
华丰家园	Huafeng Jiayuan
华富家园	Huafu Jiayuan
天欣花园	Tianxin Huayuan
名都园	Mingdu Yuan

== See also ==
- List of township-level divisions of Tianjin
