= Fengniancun Subdistrict =

Fengniancun Subdistrict 丰年村街道
- Subdistrict
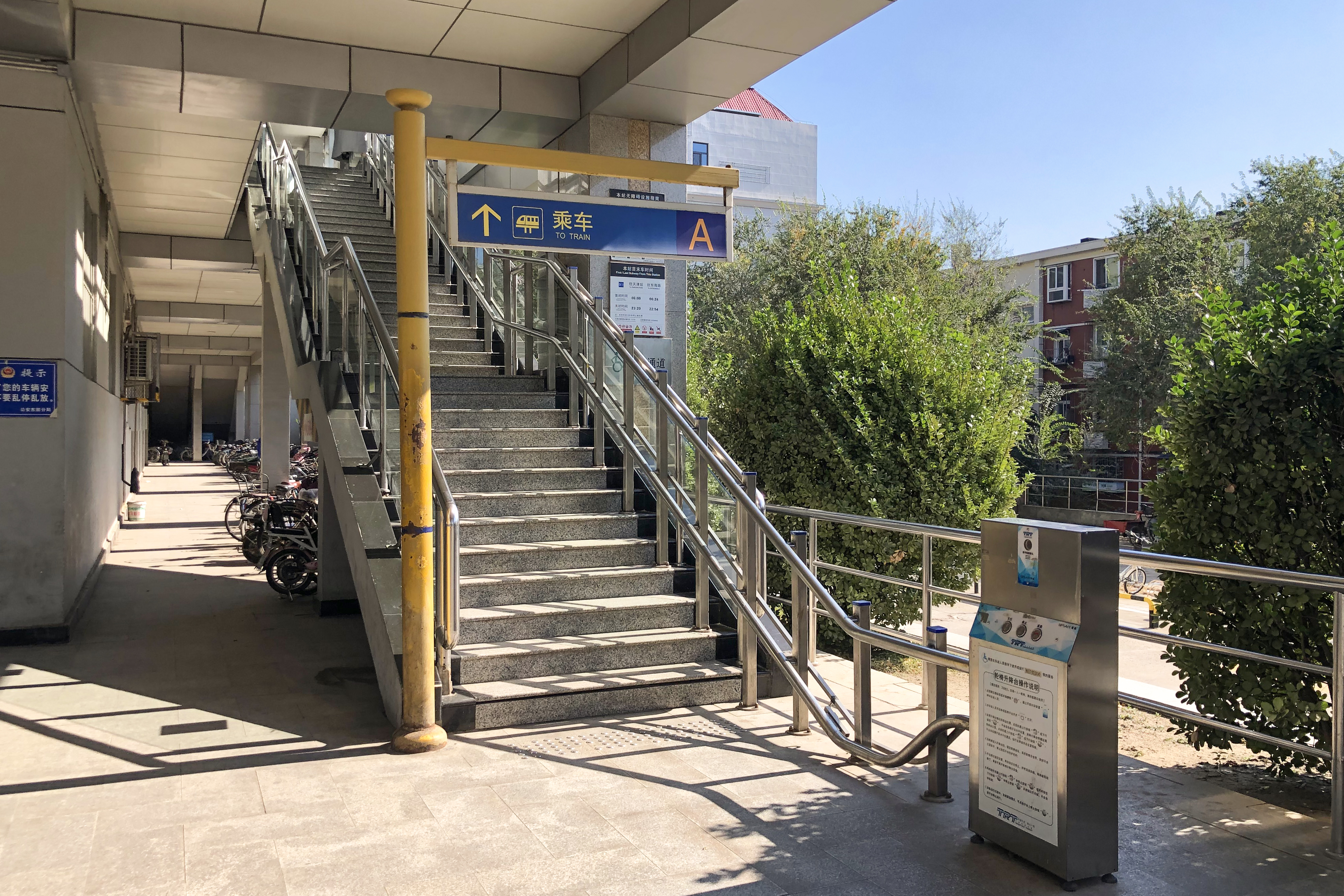
- Xinli Station of Tianjin Subway within the subdistrict, 2021

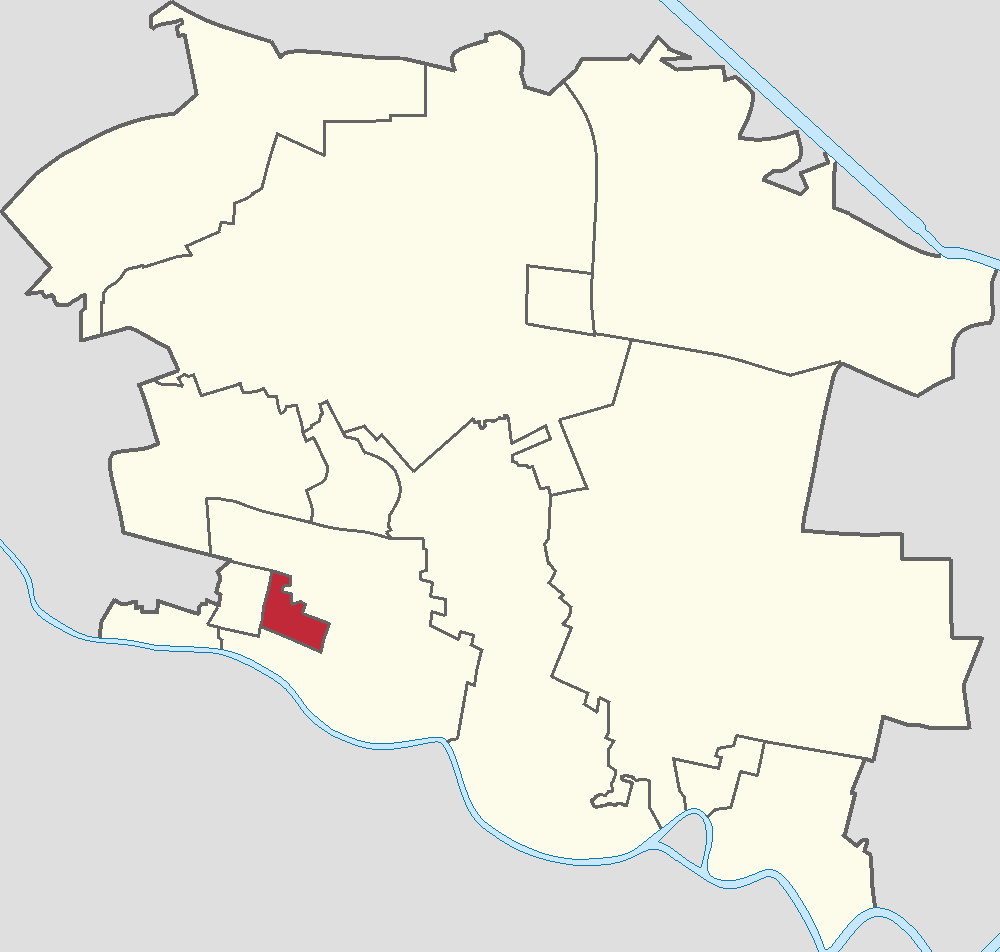
- Location of Fengniancun Subdistrict in Dongli District

- Location within Tianjin Location within China
- Coordinates: 39°04′59″N 117°19′26″E
- Country: China
- Municipality: Tianjin
- District: Dongli
- Village-level Divisions: 3 communities

Area
  - Total: 6.83 km^{2} (2.64 sq mi)
- Elevation: 5 m (16 ft)

Population (2010)
  - Total: 19,075
  - Density: 2,790/km^{2} (7,230/sq mi)
- Time zone: UTC+8 (China Standard)
- Postal code: 300399
- Area code: 022

Fengniancun Subdistrict (simplified Chinese: 丰年村街道; traditional Chinese: 豐年村街道; pinyin: Fēngniáncūn Jiēdào) is a subdistrict situated within Dongli District, Tianjin, China. It shares border with Zhangguizhuang Subdistrict to its west, and is surrounded by Xinli Subdistrict to all three other sides. Its population size was 19,075 as of 2010.

The subdistrict was established in 1988. Its name Fengniancun (Chinese: 丰年村; lit. 'year of abundance village') was taken from the local residential neighborhood constructed in 1979.

== Administrative divisions ==
At the end of 2022, the subdistrict oversaw the 3 following residential communities: Fengnianli, Xintaidao and Lixinli.

== See also ==
- List of township-level divisions of Tianjin
