= Junliangcheng Subdistrict =

Subdistrict of Tianjin, China

Junliangcheng Subdistrict 军粮城街道
- Subdistrict
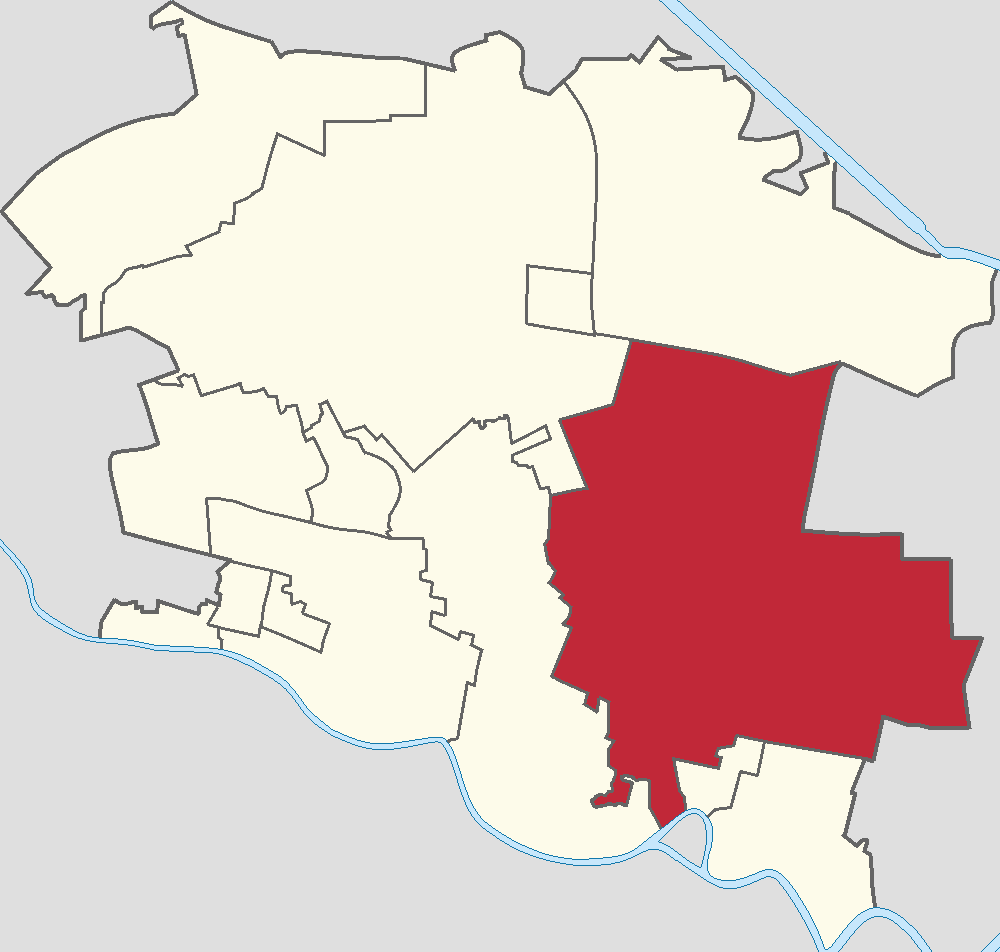
- Location in Dongli District

- Location within Tianjin Location within China
- Coordinates: 39°03′30″N 117°27′03″E
- Country: China
- Municipality: Tianjin
- District: Dongli
- Village-level Divisions: 10 communities

Area
  - Total: 33.12 km^{2} (12.79 sq mi)
- Elevation: 3 m (9.8 ft)

Population (2010)
  - Total: 52,112
  - Density: 1,573/km^{2} (4,075/sq mi)
- Time zone: UTC+8 (China Standard)
- Postal code: 300301
- Area code: 022

Junliangcheng Subdistrict (simplified Chinese: 军粮城街道; traditional Chinese: 軍糧城街道; pinyin: Jūnliángchéng Jiēdào) is a subdistrict situated inside of Dongli District, Tianjin, China. It shares a border with Huaming and Donglihu Subdistricts to the north, Beitang and Xinhe Subdistricts in the east, Hujiayuan and Wuxia Subdistircts in the southeast, and Jinqiao Subdistrict in the southwest. The subdistrict has a population of 52,112 in the year 2010.

At the time of the Tang dynasty, the imperial government set up a series of defenses in today's Beijing, Tianjin and Hebei to deter invasions from Kumo Xi and Khitan. A granary was built along the Hai River to supply the defending troops. During the Song dynasty, the area around was referred to as Juliangcheng (Chinese: 聚粮城; lit. 'Gather Grain Fort'), which later evolved to the name of Junliangcheng today.

== History ==
Timetable of Junliangcheng Subdistrict
Year	Status	Within
1948 - 1958	Junliangcheng Town	Ninghe County, Tianjin
1958 - 1962	Junliangcheng Management Area, Part of Xinlicun People's Commune	Hedong District, Tianjin
1962 - 1983	Junliangcheng People's Commune	Dongjiao District, Tianjin
1983 - 1984	Junliangcheng Township	Dongjiao District, Tianjin
1984 - 1992	Junliangcheng Town	Dongjiao District, Tianjin
1992 - 2008	Junliangcheng Town	Dongli District, Tianjin
2008–present	Junliangcheng Subdistrict	Dongli District, Tianjin

== Administrative divisions ==
At the end of 2022, Junliangcheng Subdistrict has 10 residential communities. They are, by the order of their Administrative Division Codes:

Subdivision names	Name transliterations
和顺东园	Heshun Dongyuan
和顺西园	Heshun Xiyuan
军丽园	Junli Yuan
军宏园	Junhong Yuan
军秀园	Junxiu Yuan
军华园	Junhua Yuan
裕岭嘉园	Yuling Jiayuan
军祥园	Junxiang Yuan
春竹轩	Chunzhu Xuan
冬梅轩	Dongmei Xuan

== See also ==
- List of township-level divisions of Tianjin
