= Dongli, Tianjin =

Dongli 东丽区
- District
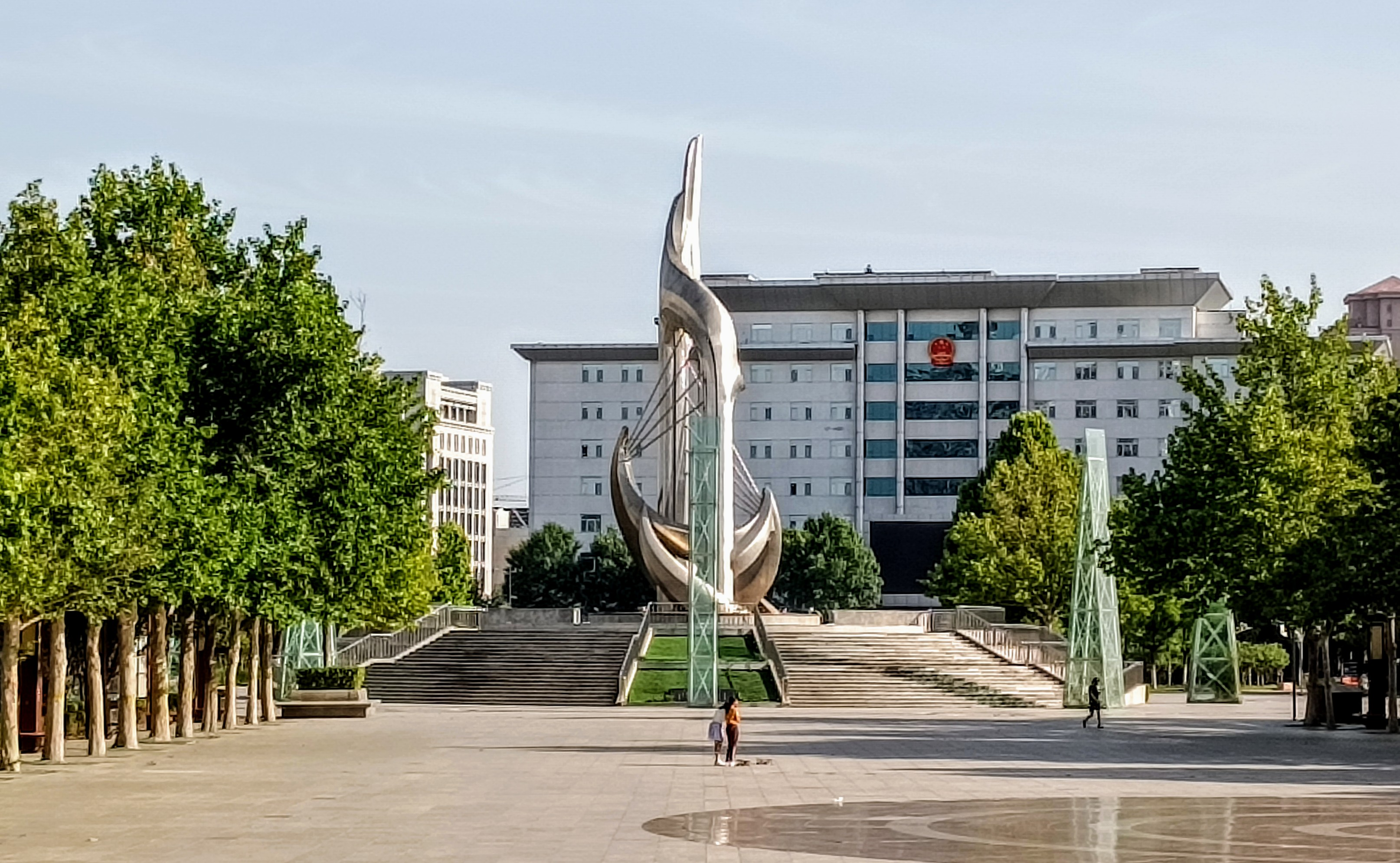
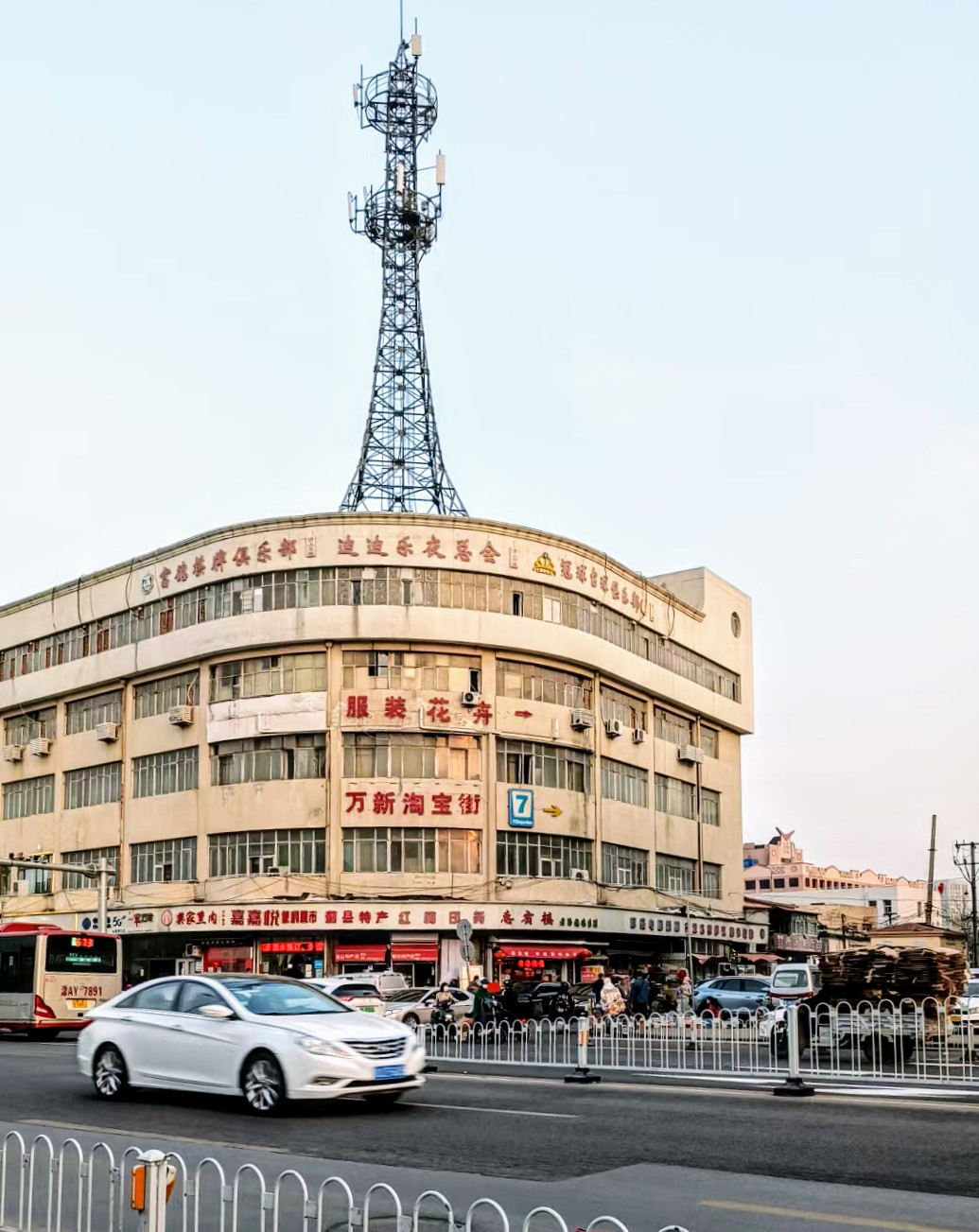
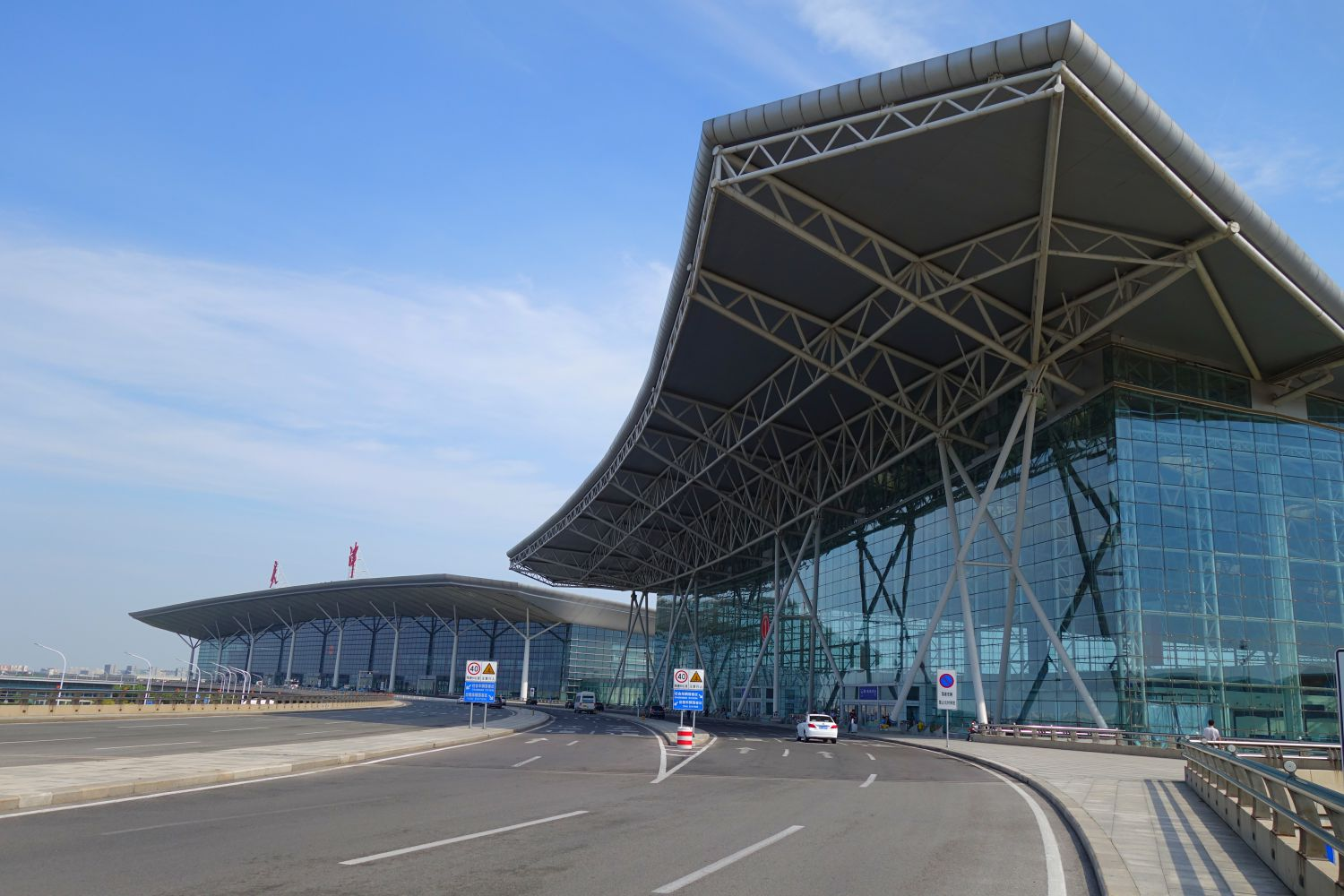
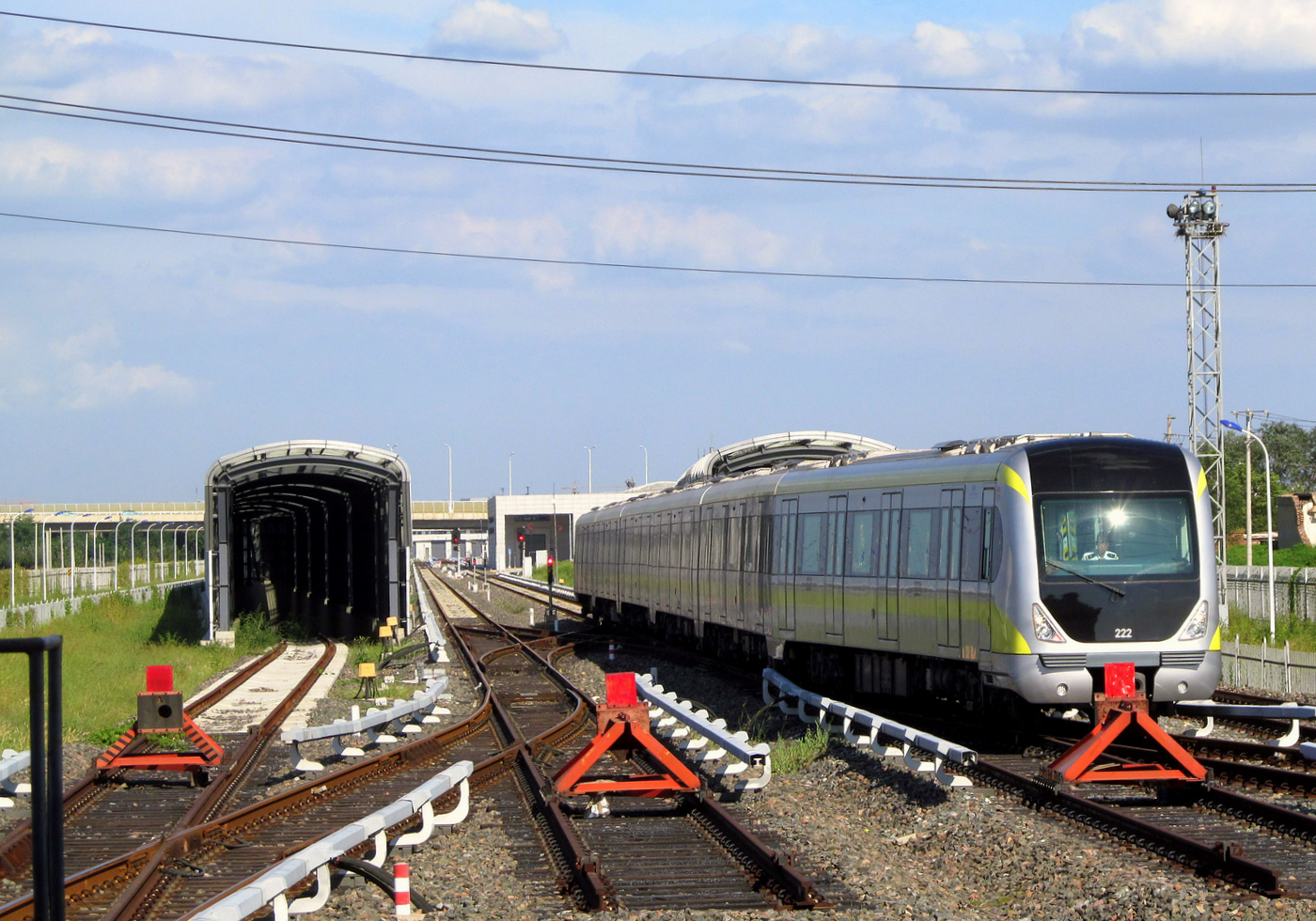
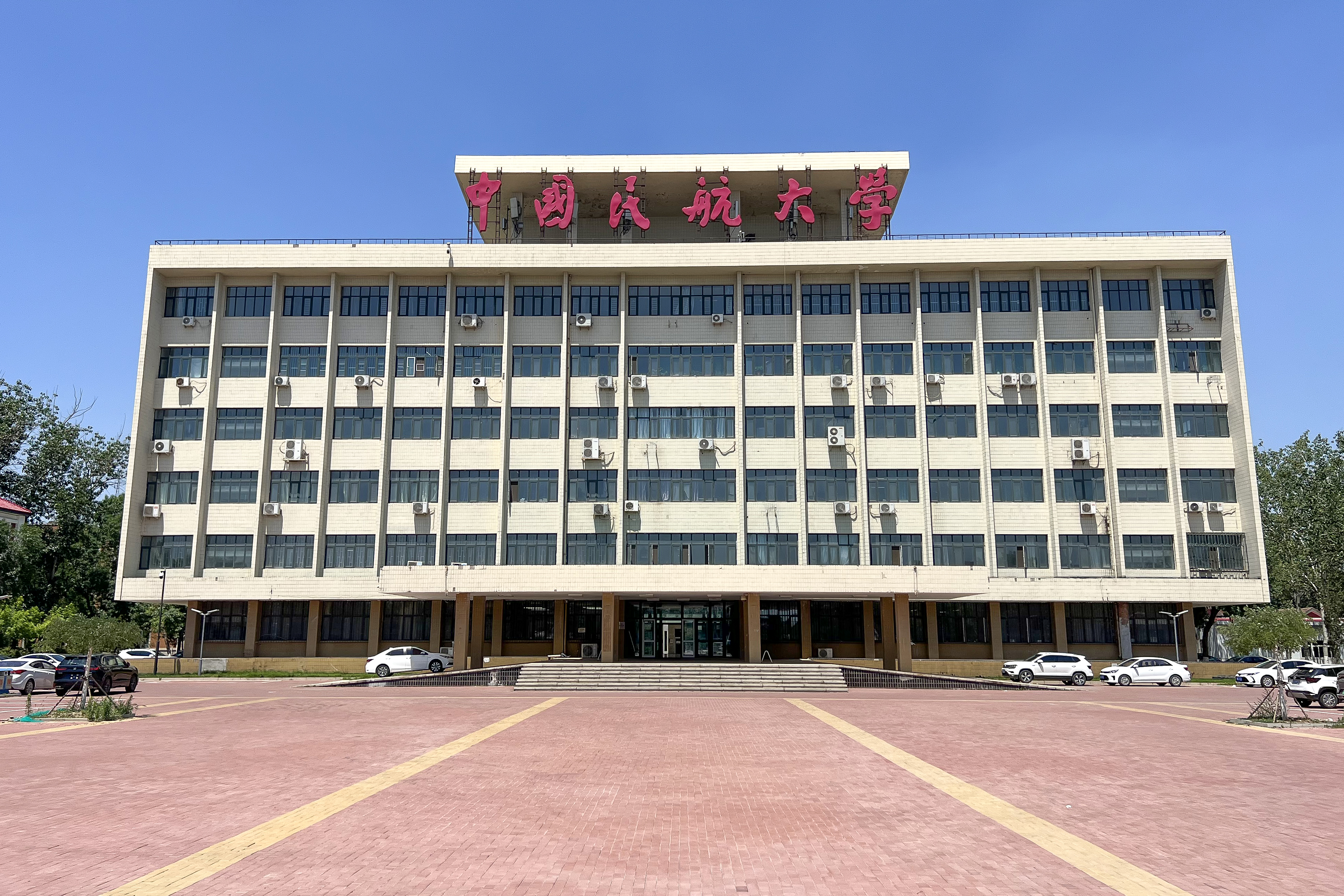
- Interactive map of Dongli
- Coordinates (Dongli government): 39°05′12″N 117°18′49″E
- Country: People's Republic of China
- Municipality: Tianjin
- Township-level divisions: 9 subdistricts
- District seat: Zhangguizhuang Subdistrict

Area
  - Total: 460 km^{2} (180 sq mi)

Population (2006)
  - Total: 320,000
  - Density: 700/km^{2} (1,800/sq mi)
- Time zone: UTC+8 (China Standard)
- Postal code: 300300
- Area code: 0022
Tianjin district map
Subdivisions of Tianjin
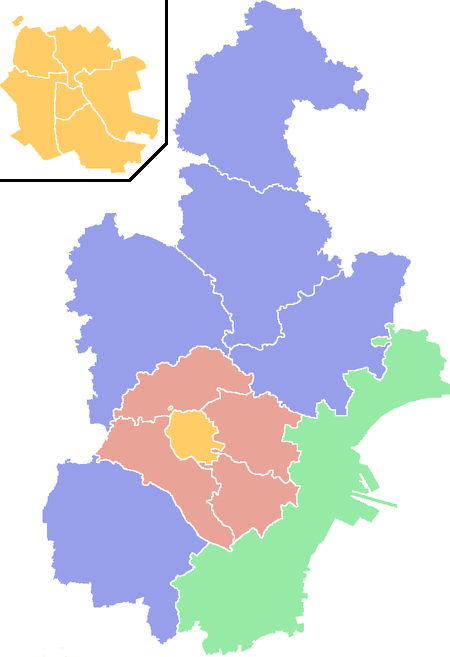
Core districts See inset
1	Heping
2	Hedong
3	Hexi
4	Nankai
5	Hebei
6	Hongqiao
Suburbs
7	Dongli
8	Xiqing
9	Jinnan
10	Beichen
Binhai and Rural
13	Binhai	14	Ninghe
11	Wuqing	15	Jinghai
12	Baodi	16	Ji Zhou
- Website: dlnet.gov.cn

Dongli District (simplified Chinese: 东丽区; traditional Chinese: 東麗區; pinyin: Dōnglì Qū) is a district of the municipality of Tianjin, People's Republic of China. Located in the district are Tianjin Binhai International Airport and Tianjin Airlines headquarters.

== Administrative divisions ==
There are 9 subdistricts in the district:

Name	Chinese (S)	Hanyu Pinyin	Population (2010)	Area (km^{2})
Zhangguizhuang Subdistrict	张贵庄街道	Zhāngguìzhuāng Jiēdào	45,931	
Fengniancun Subdistrict	丰年村街道	Fēngniáncūn Jiēdào	19,075	
Jinqiao Subdistrict	金桥街道	Jīnqiáo Jiēdào	14,252	20.06
Wuxia Subdistrict	无瑕街道	Wúxiá Jiēdào	54,126	23.86
Xinli Subdistrict	新立街道	Xīnlì Jiēdào	136,357	66.6
Wanxin Subdistrict	万新街道	Wànxīn Jiēdào	98,673	
Junliangcheng Subdistrict	军粮城街道	Jūnliángchéng Jiēdào	52,112	
Huaming Subdistrict	华明街道	Huámíng Jiēdào	64,138	150.6
Jinzhong Subdistrict	金钟街道	Jīnzhōng Jiēdào	73,732	
Huaxin Subdistrict	华新街道	Huáxīn Jiēdào	N/A	
Donglihu Subdistrict	东丽湖街道	Dōnglìhú Jiēdào	3,650	
developmental, harbor & airport zones			40,570	

== Transportation ==
=== Metro ===
Dongli is currently served by two metro lines operated by Tianjin Metro:

- Line 2 - Yudongcheng, Dengzhoulu, Guoshanlu, Konggangjingjiqu, Binhaiguojijichang
- Line 9 - Xinli, Dongli Economic Development Area, Xiaodongzhuang, Junliangcheng, Tianjin Pipe Corporation

== Climate ==
Dongli District has a humid continental climate (Köppen climate classification Dwa). The average annual temperature in Dongli is 12.7 °C (54.9 °F). The average annual rainfall is 523.5 mm (20.61 in) with July as the wettest month. The temperatures are highest on average in July, at around 26.6 °C (79.9 °F), and lowest in January, at around −3.6 °C (25.5 °F).

Climate data for Dongli District, elevation 2 m (6.6 ft), (1991–2020 normals, extremes 1981–2010)
Month	Jan	Feb	Mar	Apr	May	Jun	Jul	Aug	Sep	Oct	Nov	Dec	Year
Record high °C (°F)	13.0 (55.4)	19.9 (67.8)	30.1 (86.2)	33.1 (91.6)	38.4 (101.1)	39.0 (102.2)	41.1 (106.0)	36.9 (98.4)	35.6 (96.1)	31.0 (87.8)	23.1 (73.6)	14.4 (57.9)	41.1 (106.0)
Mean daily maximum °C (°F)	2.1 (35.8)	5.8 (42.4)	12.8 (55.0)	20.8 (69.4)	26.8 (80.2)	30.2 (86.4)	31.6 (88.9)	30.7 (87.3)	26.9 (80.4)	19.8 (67.6)	10.7 (51.3)	3.7 (38.7)	18.5 (65.3)
Daily mean °C (°F)	−2.8 (27.0)	0.4 (32.7)	7.0 (44.6)	14.8 (58.6)	21.0 (69.8)	25.0 (77.0)	27.2 (81.0)	26.3 (79.3)	21.7 (71.1)	14.3 (57.7)	5.7 (42.3)	−0.9 (30.4)	13.3 (56.0)
Mean daily minimum °C (°F)	−6.5 (20.3)	−3.7 (25.3)	2.4 (36.3)	9.6 (49.3)	15.8 (60.4)	20.6 (69.1)	23.6 (74.5)	22.7 (72.9)	17.4 (63.3)	9.9 (49.8)	1.8 (35.2)	−4.3 (24.3)	9.1 (48.4)
Record low °C (°F)	−17.0 (1.4)	−15.9 (3.4)	−9.8 (14.4)	−1.7 (28.9)	6.7 (44.1)	10.9 (51.6)	16.2 (61.2)	14.9 (58.8)	6.7 (44.1)	−2.7 (27.1)	−9.3 (15.3)	−14.7 (5.5)	−17.0 (1.4)
Average precipitation mm (inches)	2.6 (0.10)	6.0 (0.24)	6.1 (0.24)	22.8 (0.90)	37.7 (1.48)	78.0 (3.07)	141.2 (5.56)	122.3 (4.81)	54.8 (2.16)	32.8 (1.29)	13.5 (0.53)	3.1 (0.12)	520.9 (20.5)
Average precipitation days (≥ 0.1 mm)	1.3	2.3	2.5	4.5	6.2	9.0	11.1	9.8	6.4	4.8	3.0	2.0	62.9
Average snowy days	2.5	2.4	0.9	0.1	0	0	0	0	0	0	1.2	2.5	9.6
Average relative humidity (%)	54	54	49	48	53	64	73	75	67	62	60	56	60
Mean monthly sunshine hours	167.6	175.9	227.7	243.8	267.8	233.9	202.2	203.3	212.3	199.8	165.2	160.9	2,460.4
Percentage possible sunshine	55	58	61	61	60	53	45	49	58	59	55	55	56
Source: China Meteorological Administration
