= Wanxin Subdistrict =

Subdistrict of Tianjin, China

Wanxin Subdistrict 万新街道
- Subdistrict
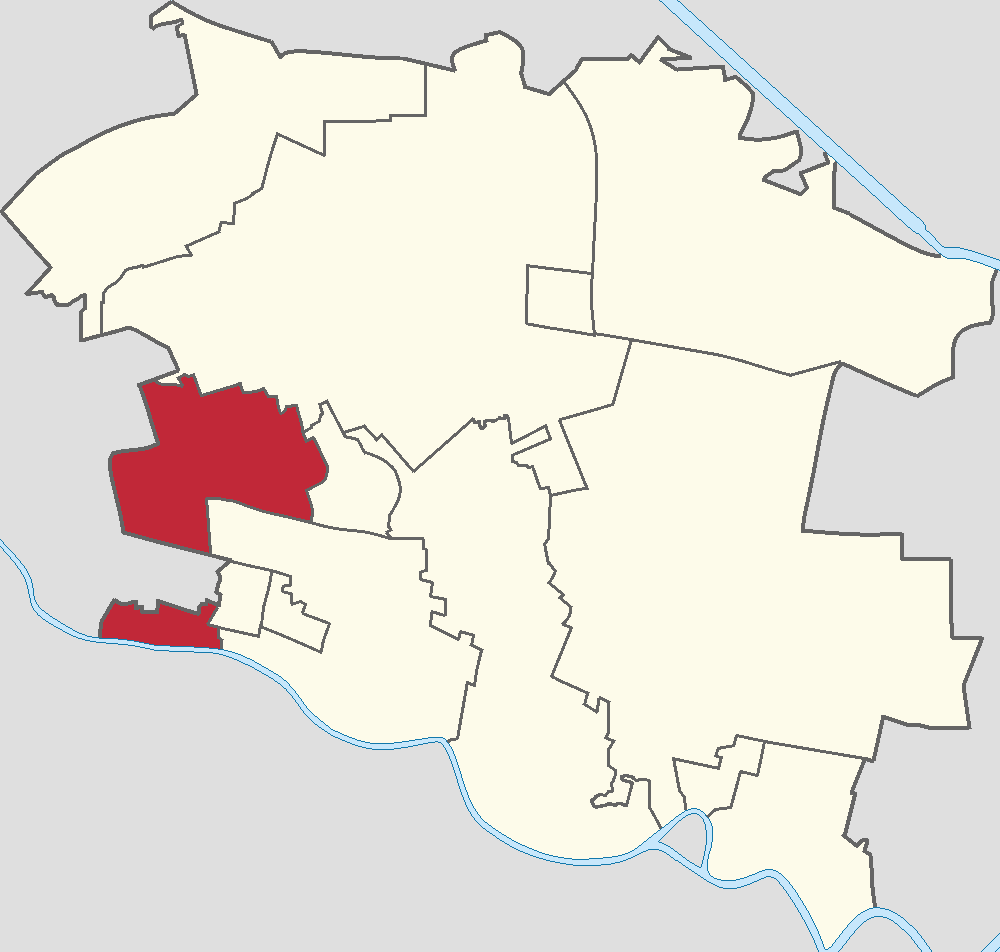
- Location of Wanxin Subdistrict in Dongli District

- Location within Tianjin Location within China
- Coordinates: 39°07′07″N 117°10′09″E
- Country: China
- Municipality: Tianjin
- District: Dongli
- Village-level Divisions: 18 communities 6 villages

Area
  - Total: 23.44 km^{2} (9.05 sq mi)
- Elevation: 5 m (16 ft)

Population (2010)
  - Total: 98,673
  - Density: 4,210/km^{2} (10,900/sq mi)
- Time zone: UTC+8 (China Standard)
- Postal code: 300162
- Area code: 022

Wanxin Subdistrict (simplified Chinese: 万新街道; traditional Chinese: 萬新街道; pinyin: Wànxīn Jiēdào) is a subdistrict located in the western part of Dongli District, Tianjin, China. It is situated to the south of Lushan Avenue and Huaming Subdistricts, west of Xinli Subdistrict and Tianjin Aviation Logistics District, north of Shuanggang Town and Liulin Subdistrict, as well as east of Dongxin and Shanghang Road Subdistricts. In addition, Wanxin has an exclave south of Erhaoqiao Subdistrict. Its population is 98,673 as of the year 2010.

The name Wanxin (Chinese: 万新; lit. 'Ten-thousand New') is inherited from Wanxinzhuang Village that predated the subdistrict.

== History ==
Timetable of Wanxin Subdistrict
Year	Status	Belong to
1958 - 1962	Wanxinzhuang Management Area, under Xinlicun People's Commune	Hedong District, Tianjin
1962 - 1983	Wanxinzhuang People's Commune	Dongjiao District, Tianjin
1983 - 1992	Wanxinzhuang Township	Dongjiao District, Tianjin
1992 - 1993	Wanxinzhuang Township	Dongli District, Tianjin
1993 - 2005	Chenglin Subdistrict	Dongli District, Tianjin
2005–present	Wanxin Subdistrict	Dongli District, Tianjin

== Administrative divisions ==
At the end of 2022, Wanxin Subdistrict is made up of 24 subdivisions, where 18 of them are residential communities and 6 of them are villages. They are listed as follows:

Subdivision names	Name transliterations	Type
荟臻里	Huizhen Li	Community
铁成公寓	Tiecheng Gongyu	Community
东城家园	Dongcheng Jiayuan	Community
欣园	Xin Yuan	Community
万新公寓	Wanxin Gongyu	Community
临月里	Linyue Li	Community
秋丽	Qiuli	Community
嘉春园	Jiachun Yuan	Community
百合春天	Baihe Chuntian	Community
海悦秋苑	Haiyue Qiuyuan	Community
季景家园	Jijing Jiayuan	Community
香邑花园	Xiangyi Huayuan	Community
好新家园	Haoxin Jiayuan	Community
畅悦华庭	Changyue Huating	Community
万隆	Wanlong	Community
程林东里	Chenglin Dongli	Community
海颂园	Haisong Yuan	Community
天津市劳动保障技师学院	Tianjinshi Laodong Baozhang Jishi Xueyuan	Community
增兴窑	Zengxing Yao	Village
南大桥	Nan Daqiao	Village
北程林	Bei Chenglin	Village
南程林	Nan Chenglin	Village
吴咀	Wuzui	Village
杜庄	Duzhuang	Village

== See also ==
- List of township-level divisions of Tianjin
