= Zhangguizhuang Subdistrict =

Zhangguizhuang Subdistrict 张贵庄街道
- Subdistrict
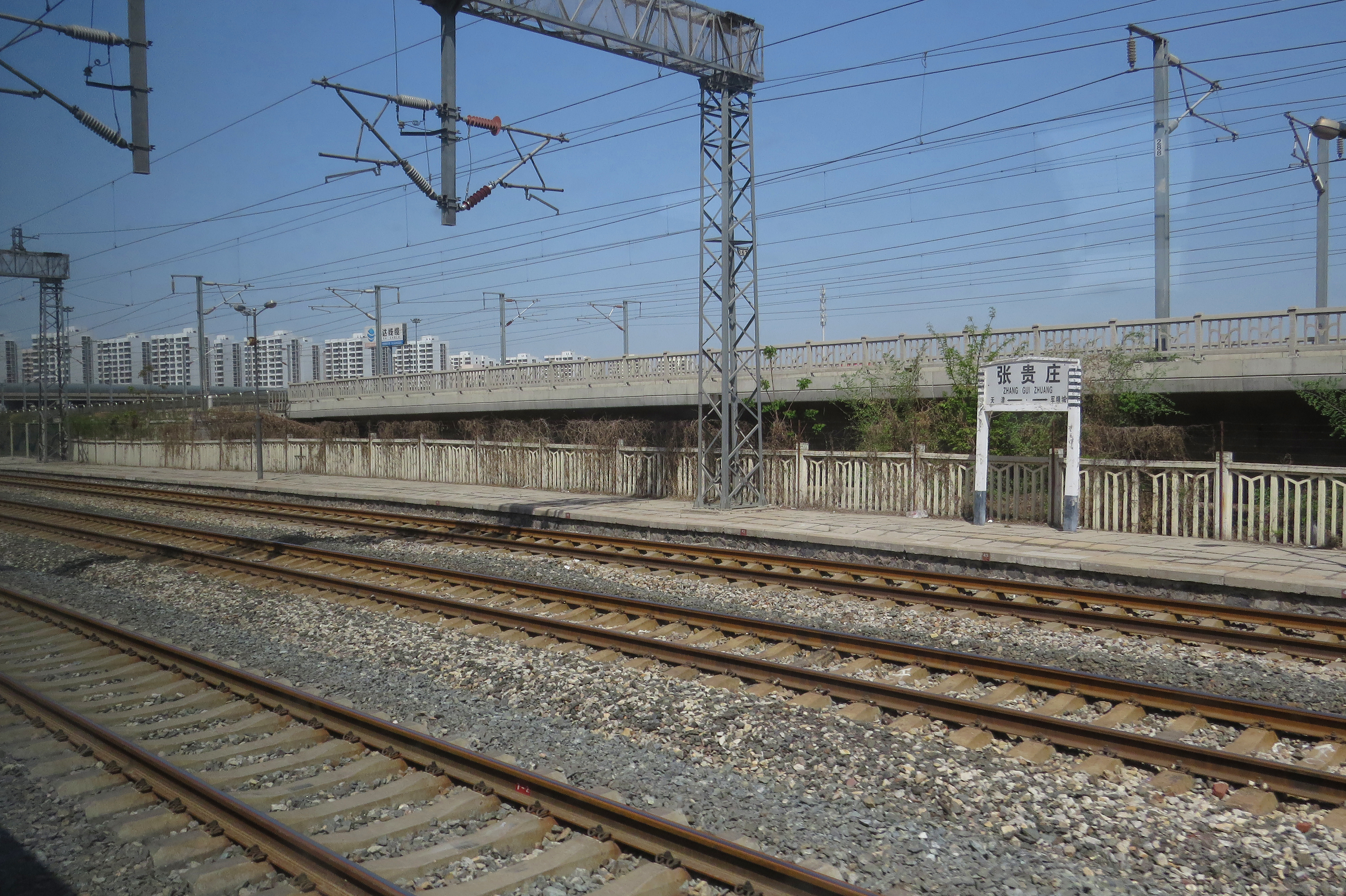
- Zhangguizhuang Railway Station on the Tianjin–Shanhaiguan railway, 2016

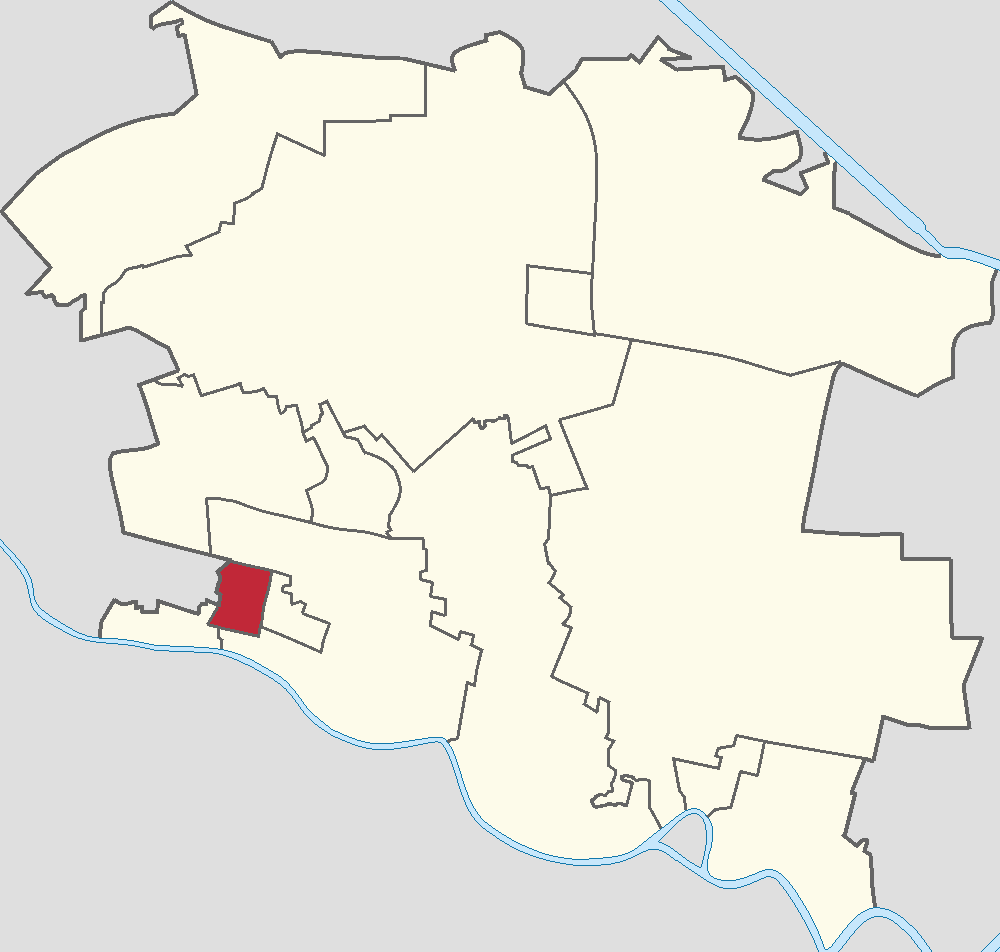
- Location of Zhangguizhuang Subdistrict within Dongli District

- Location within Tianjin Location within China
- Coordinates: 39°04′57″N 117°18′27″E
- Country: China
- Municipality: Tianjin
- District: Dongli
- Village-level Divisions: 5 communities

Area
  - Total: 2.88 km^{2} (1.11 sq mi)
- Elevation: 7 m (23 ft)

Population (2010)
  - Total: 45,931
  - Density: 15,900/km^{2} (41,300/sq mi)
- Time zone: UTC+8 (China Standard)
- Postal code: 300300
- Area code: 022

Zhangguizhuang (simplified Chinese: 张贵庄街道; traditional Chinese: 張貴莊街道; pinyin: Zhāngguìzhuāng Jiēdào) is a subdistrict and the district seat of Dongli District, Tianjin, China. It shares border with Xinli Subdistrict in the north and south, Fengniancun Subdistrict in the east, as well as Erhaoqiao and Wanxin Subdistricts in the west. As of 2010, the subdistirct had a census population of 45,391.

Its name Zhangguizhuang (Chinese: 张贵庄; lit. 'Zhang's noble manor') refers to the village that used to exist in the area.

== History ==
Timetable of Zhangguizhuang Subdistrict
Year	Status	Part of
1949 - 1953		Ninghe County, Tianjin
1953 - 1958		Dongjiao District, Tianjin
1958 - 1962		Hedong District, Tianjin
1962 - 1982		Dongjiao District, Tianjin
1982 - 1992	Zhangguizhuang Subdistrict	Dongjiao District, Tianjin
1992–present	Zhangguizhuang Subdistrict	Dongli District, Tianjin

== Administrative divisions ==
By the end of 2022, Zhangguizhuang Subdistrict consisted of 5 residential communities. They are, by the order of their Administrative Division Codes:

Subdivision names	Name transliterations
华亭里	Huatingli
先锋里	Xianfengli
永平巷	Yongping Xiang
詹滨西里	Zhanbin Xili
津门里	Jinmenli

== See also ==
- List of township-level divisions of Tianjin
- Information of Zhangguizhuang, Official website of Dongli District Government
