= Jinqiao Subdistrict, Tianjin =

Subdistrict of Tianjin, China

Jinqiao Subdistrict 金桥街道
- Subdistrict
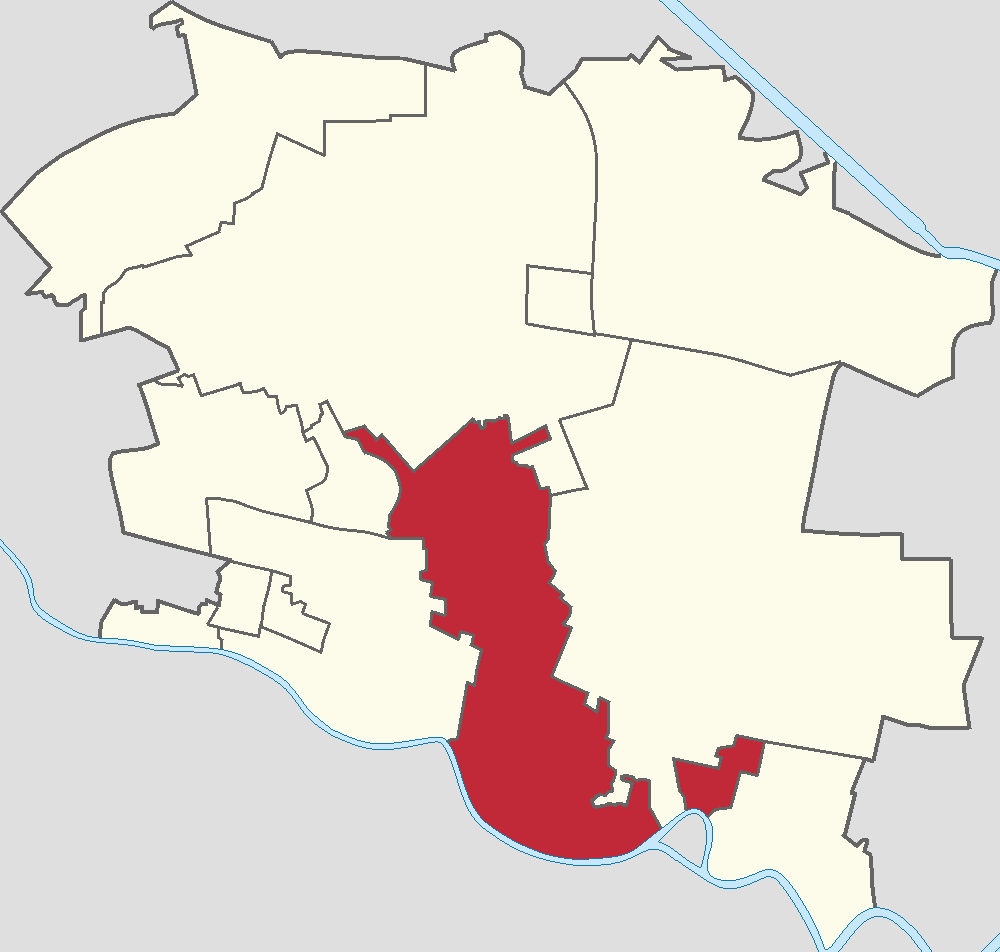
- Location of Jinqiao Subdistrict in Dongli District

- Location within Tianjin Location within China
- Coordinates: 39°05′51″N 117°20′52″E
- Country: China
- Municipality: Tianjin
- District: Dongli
- Village-level Divisions: 8 communities 3 villages

Area
  - Total: 20.52 km^{2} (7.92 sq mi)
- Elevation: 3 m (9.8 ft)

Population (2010)
  - Total: 14,252
  - Density: 694.5/km^{2} (1,799/sq mi)
- Time zone: UTC+8 (China Standard)
- Postal code: 300300
- Area code: 022

Jinqiao Subdistrict (simplified Chinese: 金桥街道; traditional Chinese: 金橋街道; pinyin: Jīnqiáo Jiēdào), formerly Meliuqiao Hui Ethnic Township, is a subdistrict located in the southern side of Dongli District, Tianjin, China. It borders Huaming Subdistrict in the north, Junliangcheng Subdistrict in the east, Shuangqiaohe and Xianshuigu Towns in the south, Xinzhuang Town in the southeast, as well as Tianjin Aviation Logistics District and Xinli Subdistrict in the west. In 2010, the subdistrict has 14,252 people residing under its administration.

The name Jinqiao (Chinese: 金桥) literally means "Golden Bridge".

== History ==
Timeline of Jinqiao Subdistrict
Year	Status	Under
1983 - 1985	Xinliqiao Township Meliuqiao Township	Dongjiao District, Tianjin
1985 - 1992	Meliuqiao Hui Ethnic Township	Dongjiao District, Tianjin
1992 - 2011	Meliuqiao Hui Ethnic Township	Dongli District, Tianjin
2011–present	Jinqiao Subdistrict	Dongli District, Tianjin

== Administrative divisions ==
As of the year 2022, Jinqiao Subdistrict comprised eight residential communities and three villages. They are listed below:

Subdivision names	Name transliterations	Type
龙泉里	Longquan Li	Community
怡盛里	Yisheng Li	Community
枫愉园	Fengyu Yuan	Community
枫悦园	Fengyue Yuan	Community
景云轩	Jingyun Xuan	Community
仁雅家园	Renya Jiayuan	Community
仁乐家园	Renle Jiayuan	Community
悦盛园	Yuesheng Yuan	Community
务本一村	Wuben Yicun	Village
务本三村	Wuben Sancun	Village
大郑	Dazheng	Village

== See also ==
- List of township-level divisions of Tianjin
