= Beizhakou =

Town in Tianjin, China

Beizhakou Town 北闸口镇
- Town
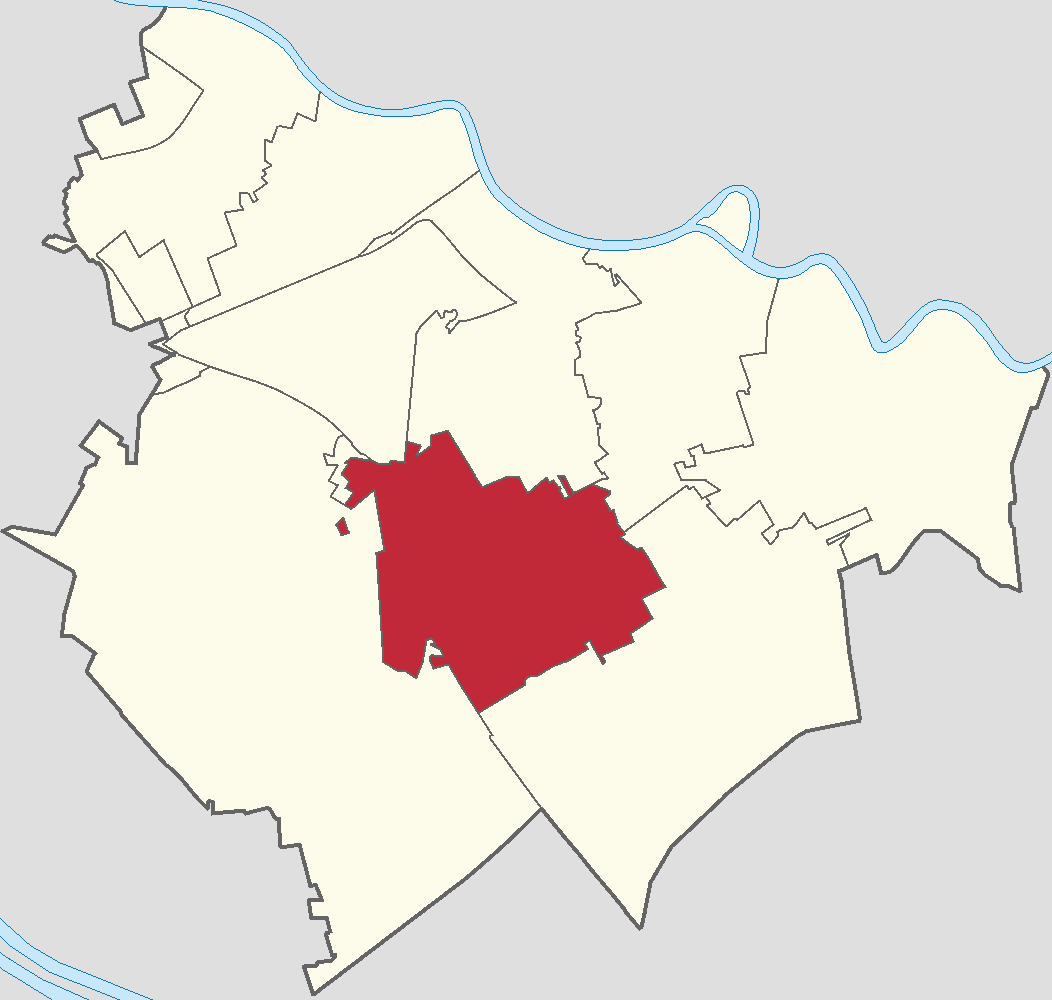
- Location within Jinnan District

- Location within Tianjin Location within China
- Coordinates: 38°56′57″N 117°23′59″E
- Country: China
- Municipality: Tianjin
- District: Jinnan
- Village-level Divisions: 8 communities 19 villages

Area
  - Total: 34.37 km^{2} (13.27 sq mi)
- Elevation: 3 m (9.8 ft)

Population (2010)
  - Total: 45,741
  - Density: 1,331/km^{2} (3,447/sq mi)
- Time zone: UTC+8 (CST)
- Postal code: 300272
- Area code: 022

Beizhakou Town (simplified Chinese: 北闸口镇; traditional Chinese: 北閘口鎮; pinyin: Běizhákǒu Zhèn) is a town situated in the center of Jinnan District, Tianjin, China. It borders Haitang Subdistrict and Xianshuigu Town to its north, Shuangqiaohe and Xiaozhan Towns to its east, as well as Balitai Town to its west. It also has an exclave within Balitai Town. The town has a population of 45,741 as of 2010.

In 1875, a division of the Huai Army was stationed in Tianin, and constructed Xuanhui Sluice in the area, where several smaller rivers flow into the Yueya River down south. The Sluice and the surrounding settlement later earned the name "Beizhakou" (Chinese: 北闸口; lit. 'North Sluice Mouth').

== History ==
History of Beizhakou Town
Time	Status	Belong to
Song and Yuan Dynasties		Qingchi County, Cangzhou Prefecture
Ming Dynasty		Jinghai County, Hejian Prefecture
Qing Dynasty		Tianjin County
1912 - 1928		Tianjin County, Zhili
1928 - 1930		Tianjin County, Hebei
1930 - 1944		Tianjin County, Tianjin
1944 - 1945		Jinda County
1945 - 1948	Under 8th District	Tianjin County, Tianjin
1948 - 1953	Under 1st District	Tianin County, Hebei
1953 - 1958	Beizhakou Town	Jinnanjiao District
1958 - 1961	Beizhakou Management Area, under Xiaozhan People's Commune	Hexi District, Tianjin
1961 - 1966	Beizhakou People's Commune	Nanjiao District, Tianjin
1966 - 1968	Dongfanghong People's Commune	Nanjiao District, Tianjin
1968 - 1984	Beizhakou People's Commune	Nanjiao District, Tianjin
1984 - 1992	Beizhakou Township	Nanjiao District, Tianjin
1992 - 1997	Beizhakou Township	Jinnan District, Tianjin
1997 - present	Beizhakou Town	Jinnan District, Tianjin

== Administrative divisions ==
At the end of 2022, Beizhakou Town has 27 subdivisions, including the following 8 residential communities and 19 villages:

=== Communities ===
- Zheng'an Li (政安里)
- Jianxin (建新)
- Zehui Yuan (泽惠园)
- Yihui Yuan (宣惠园)
- Yuhui Yuan (御惠园)
- Hongru Xinyuan (鸿儒新园)
- Shangxin Yuan (尚信园)
- Beizhakou Dianzi Gongye
  (北闸口电子工业)

=== Villages ===
- Qianjin (前进)
- Guangming (光明)
- Yueqiao (月桥)
- Yihe Zhuang (义和庄)
- Laozuoying (老左营)
- Zhengying (正营)
- Lü Tuozi (吕坨子)
- Houying (后营)
- Gaozhuangfang (高庄房)
- Yusheng (裕盛)
- Renziying (仁字营)
- Jianxin (建新)
- Beizhakou (北闸口)
- Dong Youying (东右营)
- Xi Youying (西右营)
- Bei Yixin Zhuang (北义心庄)
- Sandao Gou (三道沟)
- Dalu Zhuang (大芦庄)
- Zhaijiadian (翟家甸)

== See also ==
- List of township-level divisions of Tianjin
