= Xinzhuang, Tianjin =

Town of Tianjin, China

Xinzhuang Town 辛庄镇
- Town
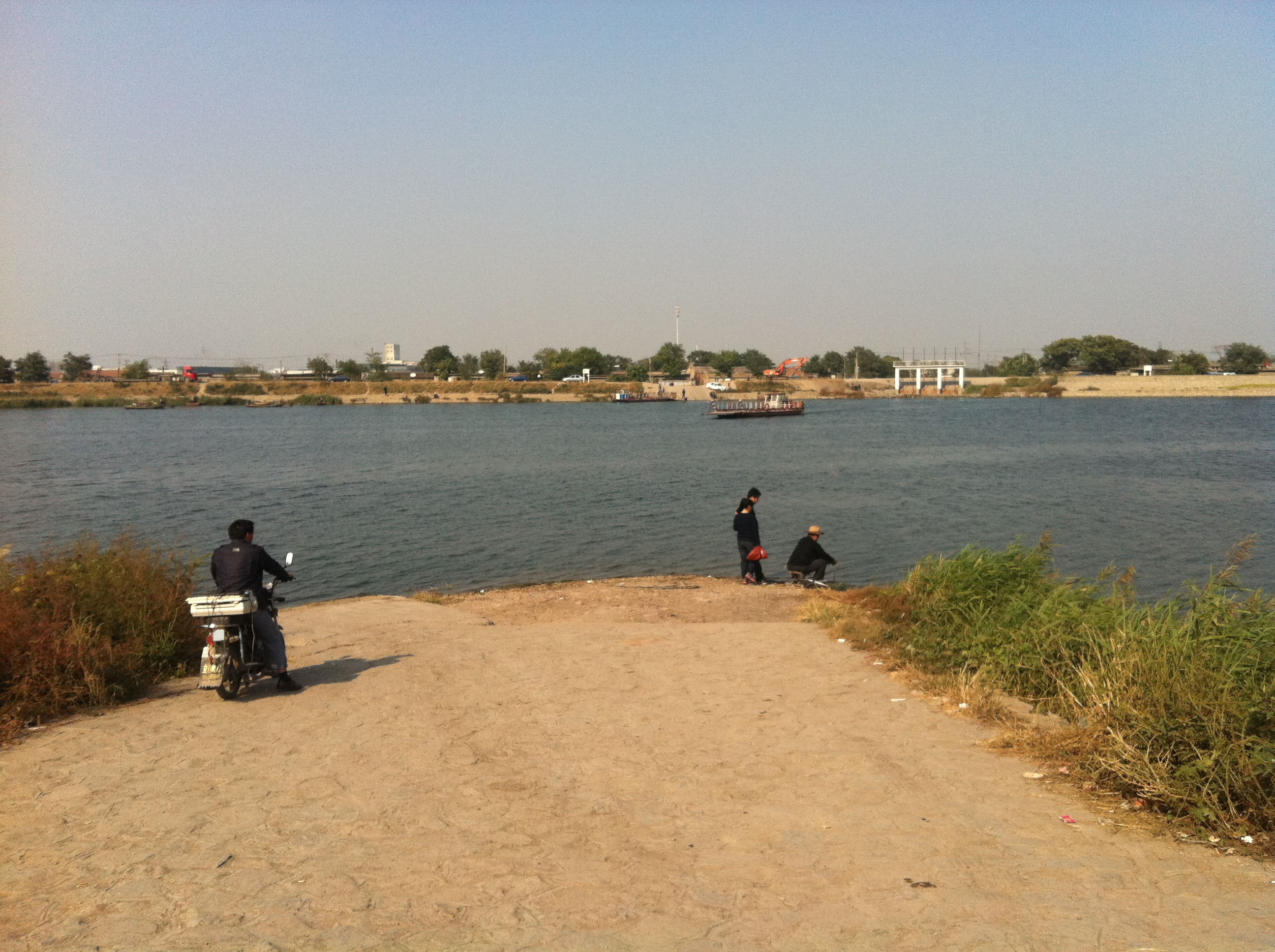
- Ferry crossing at the north of the town, 2011

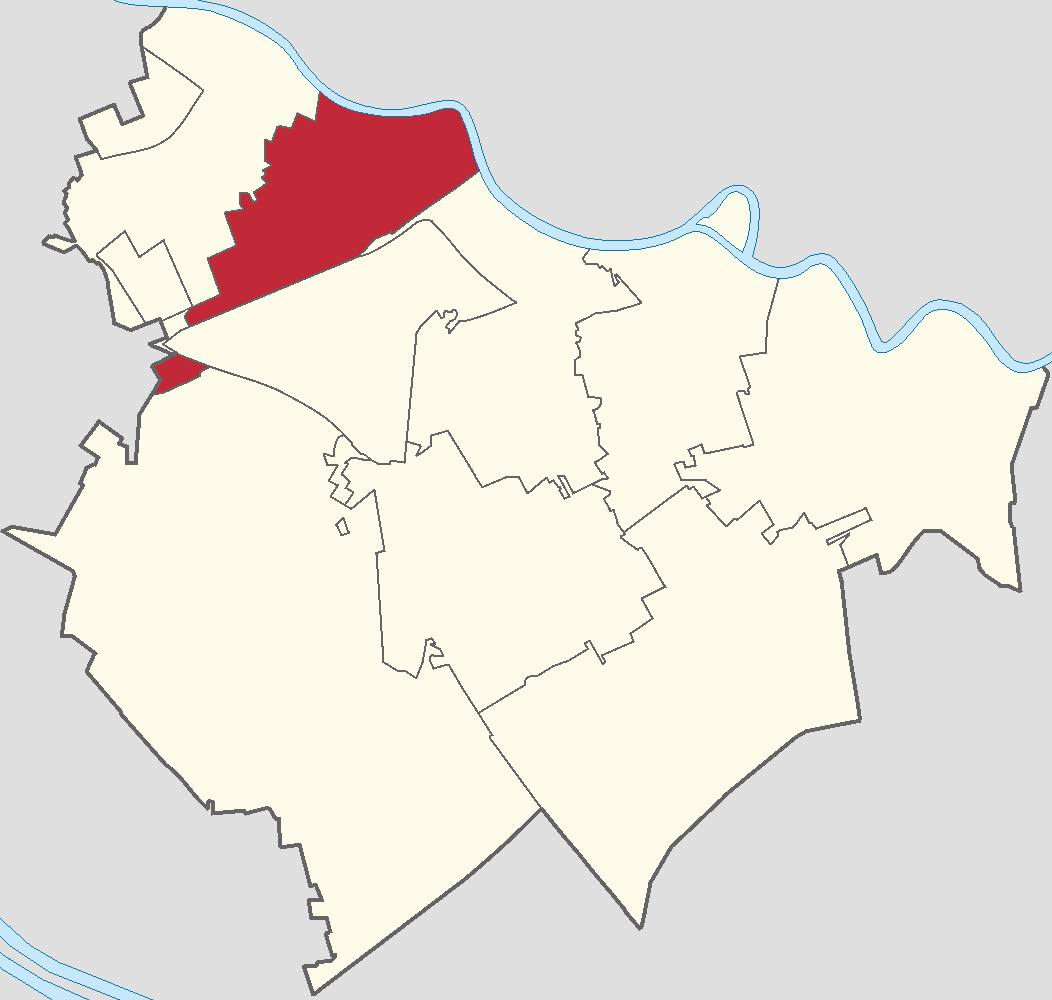
- Location of Xinzhuang within Jinnan District

- Location within Tianjin Location within China
- Coordinates: 39°01′32″N 117°20′37″E
- Country: China
- Municipality: Tianjin
- District: Jinnan
- Village-level Divisions: 11 communities 20 villages

Area
  - Total: 28.65 km^{2} (11.06 sq mi)
- Elevation: 4 m (13 ft)

Population (2010)
  - Total: 38,666
  - Density: 1,350/km^{2} (3,495/sq mi)
- Time zone: UTC+8 (CST)
- Postal code: 300354
- Area code: 022

Xinzhuang Town (simplified Chinese: 辛庄镇; traditional Chinese: 辛莊鎮; pinyin: Xīnzhuāng Zhèn) is a town located in the northwestern portion of Jinnan District, Tianjin, China. It borders Xinli and Jinqiao Subdistricts in the north, Xianshuigu Town in the east, Haitang Subdistrict in the south, Shuanggang Town in the west, and has an exclave north of Balitai Town. The town has 38,666 people residing within it as of 2010.

The name "Xinzhuang" (Chinese: 辛庄; lit. 'Xin's Manor') refers to the Zhong Xinzhuang Village that hosts the town's government since 1969.

== Geography ==
Xinzhuang is located to the south of Hai River. Tianjin Avenue (S125) and Jingu Road (S105) both pass through the town.

== History ==
Timeline of Xinzhuang Town
Years	Status	Part of
1961 - 1962	Baitangkou People's Commune	Hexi District, Tianjin
1962 - 1983	Baitangkou People's Commune	Nanjiao District, Tianjin
1983 - 1985	Baitangkou Township	Nanjiao District, Tianjin
1985 - 1992	Xinzhuang Township	Nanjiao District, Tianjin
1992 - 1997	Xinzhuang Township	Jinnan District, Tianjin
1997 - present	Xinzhuang Town	Jinnan District, Tianjin

== Administrative divisions ==
In 2022, Xinzhuang Town is divided into 31 subdivisions, of which 11 are residential communities and 20 are villages. They are listed as follows:

Subdivision names	Name transliterations	Type
鑫旺里	Xinwang Li	Community
汀上家园	Tingshang Jiayuan	Community
三鑫	Sanxin	Community
华远波士顿	Huayuan Boshidun	Community
金地艺境	Jindi Yijing	Community
首创光合城	Shouchuang Guanghe Cheng	Community
首创暖山	Shouchuang Nuanshan	Community
兰悦家园	Lanyue Jiayuan	Community
锦绣家园	Jinxiu Jiayuan	Community
名郡	Mingjun	Community
双鑫（辛庄）工业园区	Shuangxin (Xinzhuang) Gongye Yuanqu	Community
白塘口	Baitangkou	Village
上小汀	Shang Xiaoting	Village
唐庄子	Tang Zhuangzi	Village
前辛庄	Qian Xinzhuang	Village
中辛庄	Zhong Xinzhuang	Village
后辛庄	Hou Xinzhuang	Village
下小汀	Xia Xiaoting	Village
张满庄	Zhangman Zhuang	Village
生产圈	Shengchangjuan	Village
邢庄子	Xing Zhuangzi	Village
高庄子	Gao Zhuangzi	Village
上王庄	Shang Wangzhuang	Village
张家咀	Zhangjiaju	Village
柴辛庄	Chai Xinzhuang	Village
上郭庄	Shang Guozhuang	Village
继泰	Jitai	Village
柴家圈	Chaijiajuan	Village
新桥	Xinqiao	Village
清和	Qinghe	Village
建明	Jianming	Village

== See also ==
- List of township-level divisions of Tianjin
