= Shuangqiaohe =

Town of Tianjin, China

Shuangqiaohe Town 双桥河镇
- Town
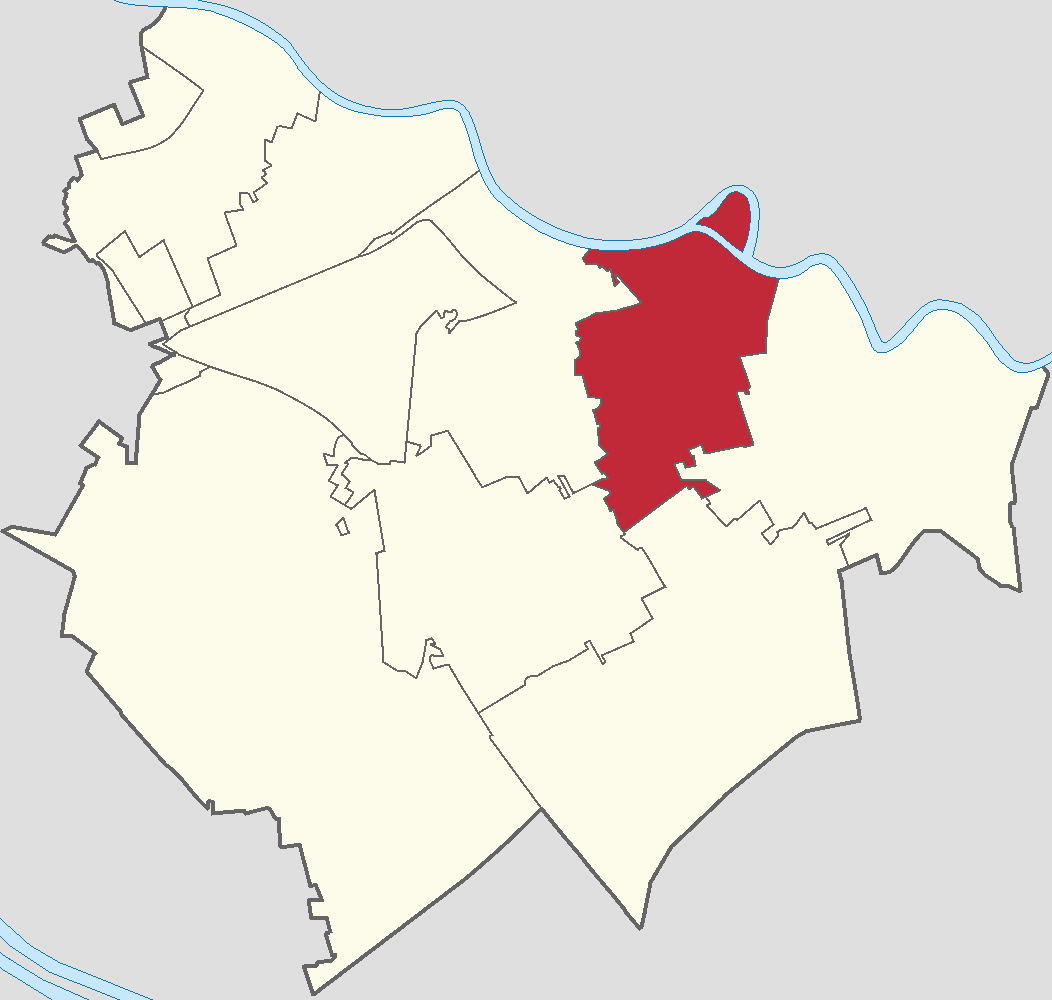
- Location in Jinnan District

- Location within Tianjin Location within China
- Coordinates: 38°59′22″N 117°25′56″E
- Country: China
- Municipality: Tianjin
- District: Jinnan
- Village-level Divisions: 4 communities 16 villages

Area
  - Total: 24.98 km^{2} (9.64 sq mi)
- Elevation: 4 m (13 ft)

Population (2010)
  - Total: 37,193
  - Density: 1,489/km^{2} (3,856/sq mi)
- Time zone: UTC+8 (CST)
- Postal code: 300352
- Area code: 022

Shuangqiaohe Town (simplified Chinese: 双桥河镇; traditional Chinese: 雙橋河鎮; pinyin: Shuāngqiáohé Zhèn) is a town situated in the northern portion of Jinnan District, Tianjin, China. It shares a border with Jinqiao and Junliangcheng Subdistricts in the north, Wuxia Subdistrict and Gegu Town in the east, Xiaozhan and Beizhakou Towns in the south, as well as Xianshuigu Town in the west. Its population is determined to be 37,193 as of 2010.

The name "Shuangqiaohe" can be literally translated as "Two Bridge River".

== Geography ==
Shuangqiaohe is located on the south of Hai River. Jinjin Expressway (S50) passes through the south of the town.

In July 2020, the National Health Council named Shuangqiaohe Township as a national health township for the 2017-2019 cycle.

== History ==
Timeline of Shuangqiaohe's History
Time	Status	Belong to
Song and Yuan dynasties	Nigu Stockade	
Ming dynasty	Nigu Village	
Qing dynasty	Dong Nigu Village Xi Nigu Village	
1912 - 1937	Dong Nigu Village Xi Nigu Village	
1937 - 1949	Dong Nigu Township	
1949 - 1958	Dong Nigu Township	Tianjin County
1958 - 1959	Under Meiman People's Commune	Hexi District, Tianjin
1959 - 1962	Under Xiaozhan People's Commune	Hexi District, Tianjin
1962 - 1983	Xi Nigu People's Commune	Nanjiao District, Tianjin
1983 - 1984	Xi Nigu Township	Nanjiao District, Tianjin
1984 - 1992	Shuangqiaohe Township	Nanjiao District, Tianjin
1992 - 1997	Shuangqiaohe Township	Jinnan District, Tianjin
1997 - present	Shuangqiaohe Town	Jinnan District, Tianjin

== Administrative divisions ==
As of 2022, Shuangqiaohe Town is divided into 20 subdivisions, comprising 4 residential communities and 16 villages. They are listed below:

Subdivision names	Name transliterations	Type
聚和园	Juhe Yuan	Community
福和园	Fuhe Yuan	Community
信和园	Xinhe Yuan	Community
双桥河镇工业园	Shuangqiaohe Zhen Gongye Yuan	Community
东嘴	Dong Zui	Village
东泥沽	Dong Nigu	Village
小韩庄	Xiao Hangzhuang	Village
西官房	Xi Guanfang	Village
西泥沽	Xi Nigu	Village
柴庄子	Chai Zhuangzi	Village
孙庄子	Sun Zhuangzi	Village
东周庄	Dong Zhouzhuang	Village
王庄	Wang Zhuang	Village
西周庄	Xi Zhouzhuang	Village
南房子	Nan Fangzi	Village
李家圈	Li Jiaquan	Village
刘家圈	Liu Jiaquan	Village
闫家圈	Yan Jiaquan	Village
韩家圈	Hang Jiaquan	Village
小营盘	Xiao Yingpan	Village

== See also ==
- List of township-level divisions of Tianjin
