= Balitai =

Town in Tianjin, China

Balitai Town 八里台镇
- Town
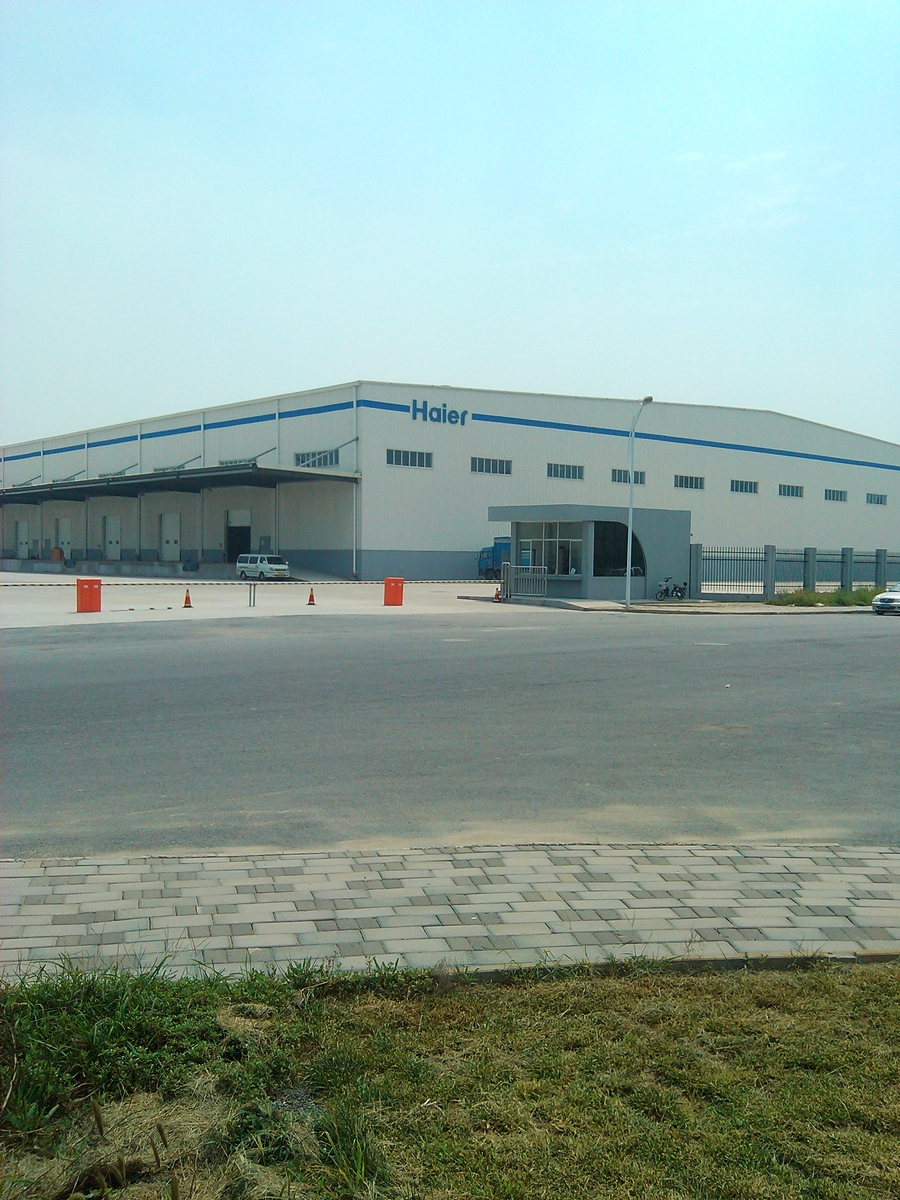
- Hai'er Logistic Center inside the town, 2012

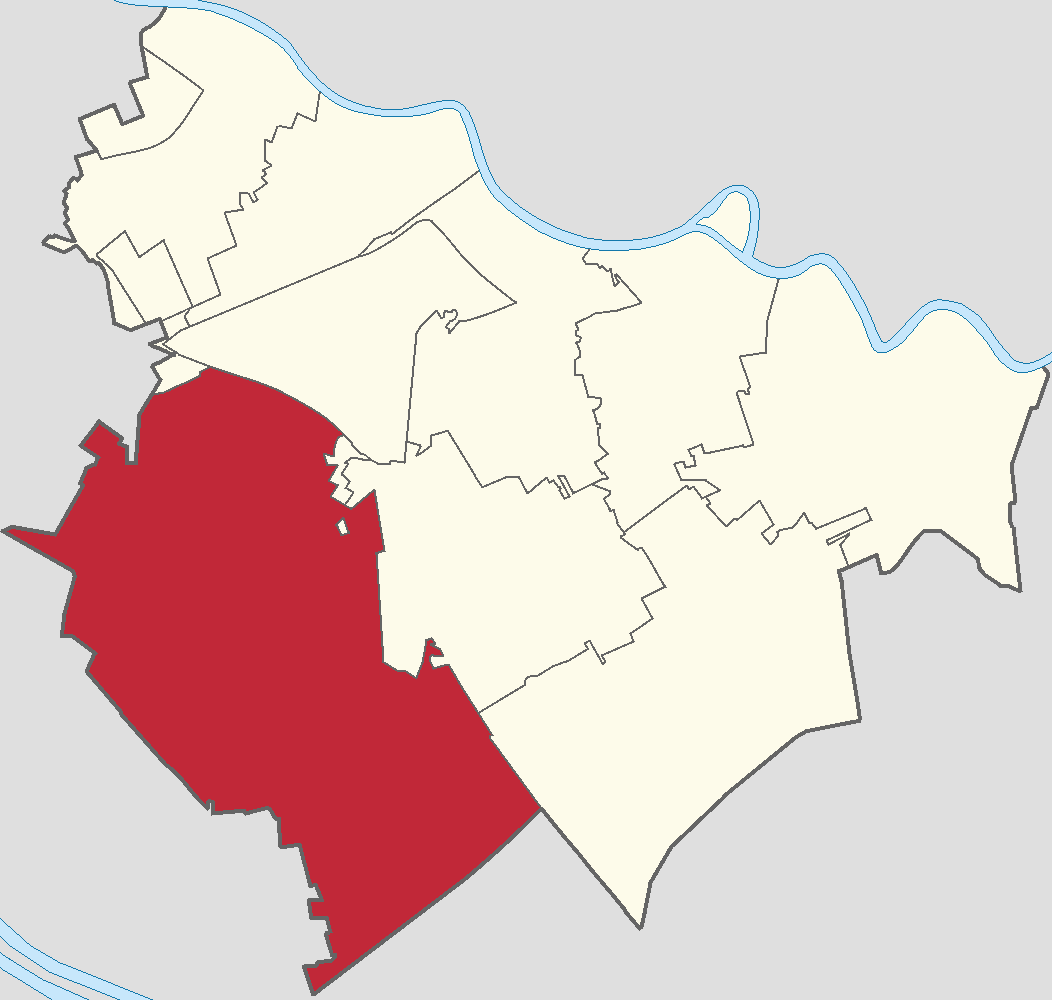
- Location in Jinnan District

- Location within Tianjin Location within China
- Coordinates: 38°56′40″N 117°18′36″E
- Country: China
- Municipality: Tianjin
- District: Jinnan
- Village-level Divisions: 12 communities 15 villages

Area
  - Total: 103.2 km^{2} (39.8 sq mi)
- Elevation: 3 m (9.8 ft)

Population (2010)
  - Total: 59,177
  - Density: 573.4/km^{2} (1,485/sq mi)
- Time zone: UTC+8 (CST)
- Postal code: 300356
- Area code: 022

Balitai Town (simplified Chinese: 八里台镇; traditional Chinese: 八里台鎮; pinyin: Bālǐtái Zhèn) is a town in southwestern Jinnan District, Tianjin, China. It is located to the south of Haitang Subdistrict and Xinzhuang Town, west of Xiaozhan and Beizhakou Towns, north of Zhongtang Town, as well as east of Dasi and Wangwenzhuang Towns. It also contains an exclave of Beizhakou Town in the eastern portion. In 2010, the town is home to 59,177 inhabitants.

The name "Balitai" literally means "Eight Li Platform".

== History ==
Timetable of Balitai Town
Time	Status	Within
Qing Dynasty		Jinghai County, Hejian Prefecture
1912 - 1948		Tianjin County
1948 - 1949	Part of 1st District	Tianjin County
1949 - 1953	Part of 6th District	Tianjin County
1953 - 1956	Part of 6th District	Xiqing District, Tianjin
1956 - 1959	Xi Xiaozhan Township	Xiqing District, Tianjin
1959 - 1961	Part of Xiaozhan People's Commune	Hexi District, Tianjin
1961 - 1984	Balitai People's Commune	Nanjiao District, Tianjin
1984 - 1986	Balitai Township; Xi Xiaozhan Township	Nanjiao District, Tianjin
1986 - 1992	Balitai Township; Shuangzha Township	Nanjiao District, Tianjin
1992 - 1995	Balitai Town; Shuangzha Township	Jinnan District, Tianjin
1995 - 2001	Balitai Town; Shuangzha Town	Jinnan District, Tianjin
2001 - present	Balitai Town	Jinnan District, Tianjin

== Administrative divisions ==
At the end of 2022, there are 27 subdivisions within Balitai Town, consisting of 12 residential communities and 15 villages. They are listed as follows:

=== Communities ===
- Xinchun (新春)
- Balifang (八里坊)
- Bigui Yuan Diyi (碧桂园第一)
- Jinjiao (金桥)
- Pinhu Yuan (品湖苑)
- Haitian (海天)
- Lanhai (澜海)
- Bigui Yuan Di'er (碧桂园第二)
- Shuanghui Yuan (双辉园)
- Huixiu Tingyuan (汇秀庭苑)
- Balitai Gongye Yuanqu
  (八里台工业园区)
- Taida Weidianzi Gongye Qu
  (泰达微电子工业区)

=== Villages ===
- Balitai (八里台)
- Juge Zhuang (巨葛庄)
- Dasun Zhuang (大孙庄)
- Dahan Zhuang (大韩庄)
- Tuanwa (团洼)
- Xi Xiaozhan (西小站)
- Xiaohuang Zhuang (小黄庄)
- Heshundi (和顺地)
- Pan Jiawa (潘家洼)
- Shuangzha (双闸)
- Zhong Yi (中义)
- Nan Yi (南义)
- Mao Jiagou (毛家沟)
- Liu Jiagou (刘家沟)
- Bei Zhongtang (北中塘)

== See also ==
- List of township-level divisions of Tianjin
