= Shuanggang, Tianjin =

Town of Tianjin, China

Shuanggang Town 双港镇 Shuangjiang Town
- Town
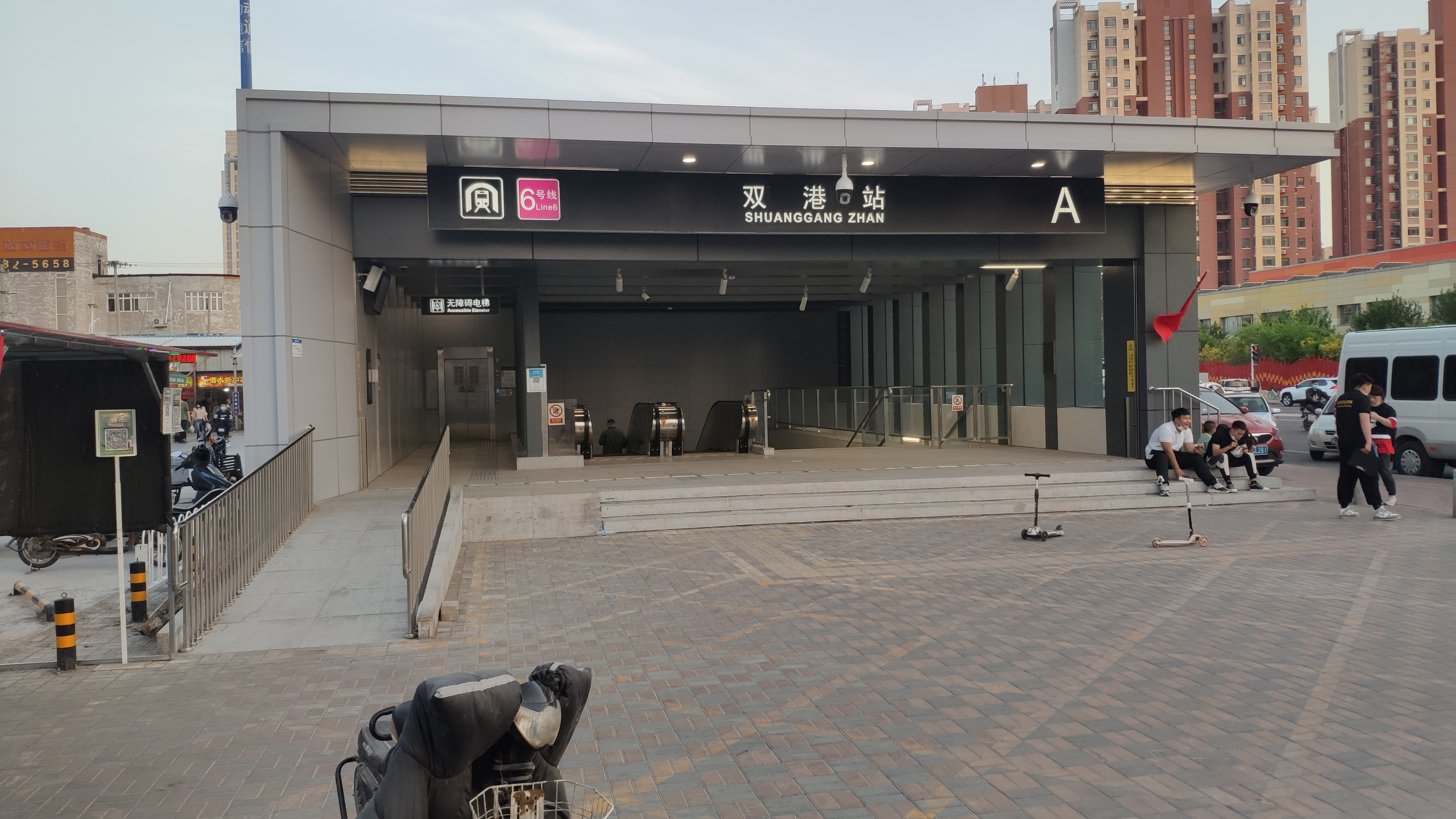
- Shuanggang Station of Tianjin Metro on the west of the subdistrict, 2022

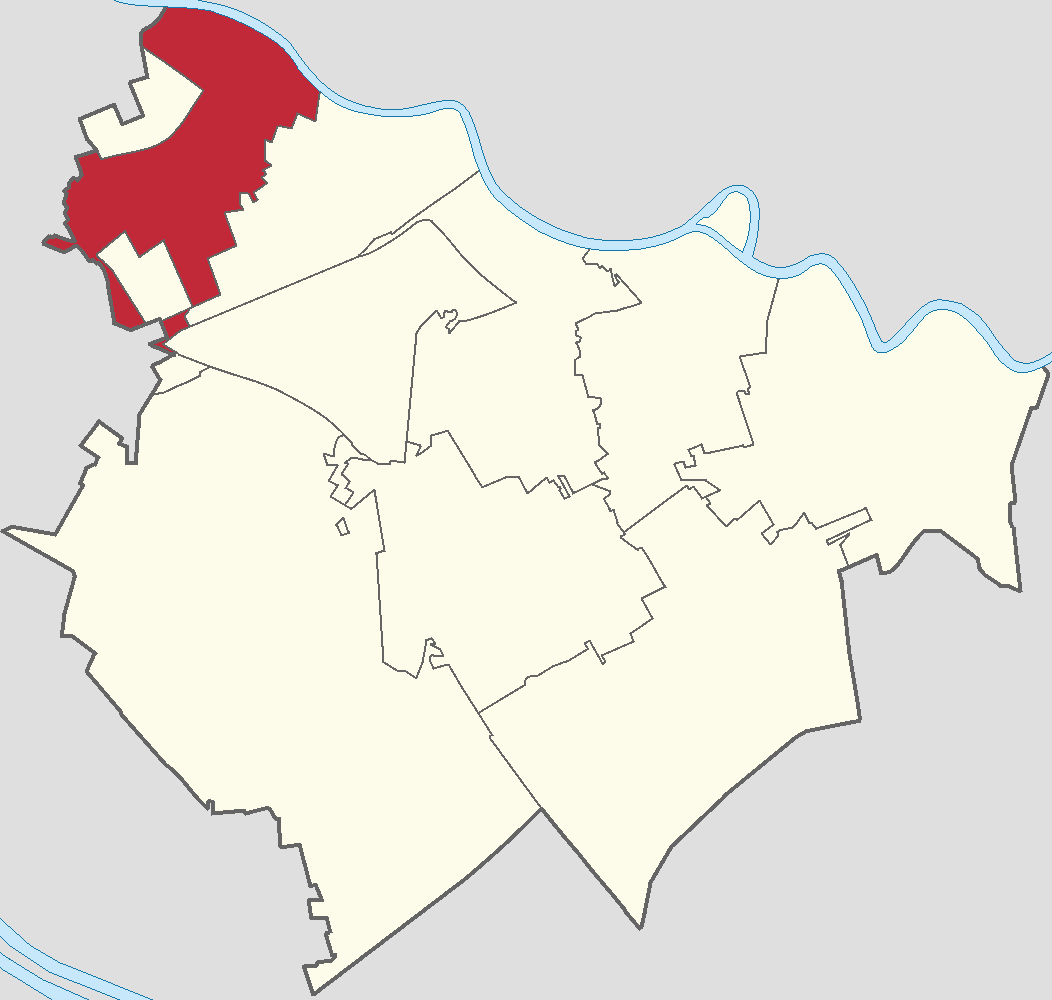
- Location of Shuanggang in Jinnan District

- Location within Tianjin Location within China
- Coordinates: 39°02′31″N 117°18′44″E
- Country: China
- Municipality: Tianjin
- District: Jinnan
- Village-level Divisions: 16 communities 16 villages

Area
  - Total: 35.10 km^{2} (13.55 sq mi)
- Elevation: 4 m (13 ft)

Population (2010)
  - Total: 103,185
  - Density: 2,940/km^{2} (7,614/sq mi)
- Time zone: UTC+8 (CST)
- Postal code: 300353
- Area code: 022

Shuanggang Town (simplified Chinese: 双港镇; traditional Chinese: 雙港鎮; pinyin: Shuānggǎng Zhèn), or Shuangjiang Town as pronounced by the locals, is a town in Jinnan District, Tianjin, China. It borders Wanxin and Xinli Subdistricts to its north, Xinzhuang Town to its east, Haitang Subdistrict to its south, Dasi Town and Taihulu Subdistrict to its west, as well as Liulin Subdistrict to its northwest. It also contains two subdistricts within: Shuangxin and Shuanglin. As of 2010, it has 103,185 inhabitants under its administration.

The name "Shuanggang" can be literally translated as "Two Ports". The Tianjin TEDA Company started operating its first waste-incineration power plant within the town on 16 December 2004.

== History ==
The area was part of Shuanggang People's Commune during the 1960s and 70s. In 1983, it was transformed into Shuanggang Township. In 1992, the township became Shuanggang Town under Jinnan District.

== Administrative divisions ==
At the end of 2022, Shuanggang Town is divided into 32 subdivisions, consisting of 16 residential communities and 16 villages. They are showed in the following list:

Subdivision names	Name transliterations	Type
鑫港园	Xingang Yuan	Community
仁和园	Renhe Yuan	Community
河畔星城	Hepan Xingcheng	Community
柳林	Liulin	Community
福港园	Fugang Yuan	Community
善和园	Shanhe Yuan	Community
林景家园	Linjing Jiayuan	Community
格林	Gelin	Community
领世郡	Lingshi Jun	Community
桃园	Taoyuan	Community
御荣联	Yurong Lian	Community
格林第二	Gelin Di'er	Community
领世郡第二	Lingshi Jun Di'er	Community
十八局	Shiba Ju	Community
领仕港湾	Lingshi Gangwan	Community
天津双港工业园区	Tianjin Shuanggang Gongye Yuanqu	Community
何庄子	He Zhuangzi	Village
宋庄子	Song Zhuangzi	Village
黄庄子	Huang Zhuangzi	Village
芦庄子	Lu Zhuangzi	Village
李楼	Li Lou	Village
小辛庄	Xiaoxin Zhuang	Village
桃源沽	Taoyuan Gu	Village
双港	Shuanggang	Village
海河湾	Haihe Wan	Village
南马集	Nan Maji	Village
北马集	Bei Maji	Village
先锋	Xianfeng	Village
郭黄庄	Guohuang Zhuang	Village
前三合	Qian Sanhe	Village
后三合	Hou Sanhe	Village
西三合	Xi Sanhe	Village

== See also ==
- List of township-level divisions of Tianjin
