= International School of Tianjin =

International school in Tianjin, China

- Weishan South Road, Shuanggang, Jinnan District, Tianjin 300350; China

Information
- Type: International Baccalaureate International School; Private School
- Founded: 1994
- Director: Steve Moody
- Grades: Nursery–12
- Enrollment: 450+
- Campus type: Large Private Campus
- Colors: Red, black, yellow
- Mascot: IST Blaze
- Newspaper: Blaze
- Website: http://www.istianjin.org

International School of Tianjin
- Simplified Chinese: 天津经济技术开发区国际学校天津分校
- Traditional Chinese: 天津經濟技術開發區國際學校天津分校
- Literal meaning: Tianjin Economic and Technology Development Zone International School Tianjin Branch School
Transcriptions
Standard Mandarin
- Hanyu Pinyin: Tiānjīn Jīngjì Jìshù Kāifāqū Guójì Xuéxiào Tiānjīn Fēnxiào

The International School of Tianjin (“IST”) is a branch campus of TEDA International School (TEDA), a public K 9 compulsory education school administered by Binhai New Area. Its sponsoring authority is Binhai New Area (development zone), and its approving regulator is the Binhai New Area Education Bureau (district level).

The International School of Tianjin (IST, Chinese: 天津经济技术开发区国际学校天津分校) is an international school in Jinnan District, Tianjin.

The school was founded in 1994. IST uses the IB PYP (IB Primary Years Programme) until grade 5, IB MYP (IB Middle Years Programme) until grade 10 and the IB DP (IB Diploma Programme) from grades 11 to 12. The school provides education from Nursery to grade 12.

== Student body ==
IST's student body consists of over 350 students - National and Foreign from 32 countries.

== Teachers ==
IST currently has over 50 teachers recruited internationally.
