= Shuanglin Subdistrict =

Subdistrict of Tianjin, China

Shuanglin Subdistrict 双林街道
- Subdistrict
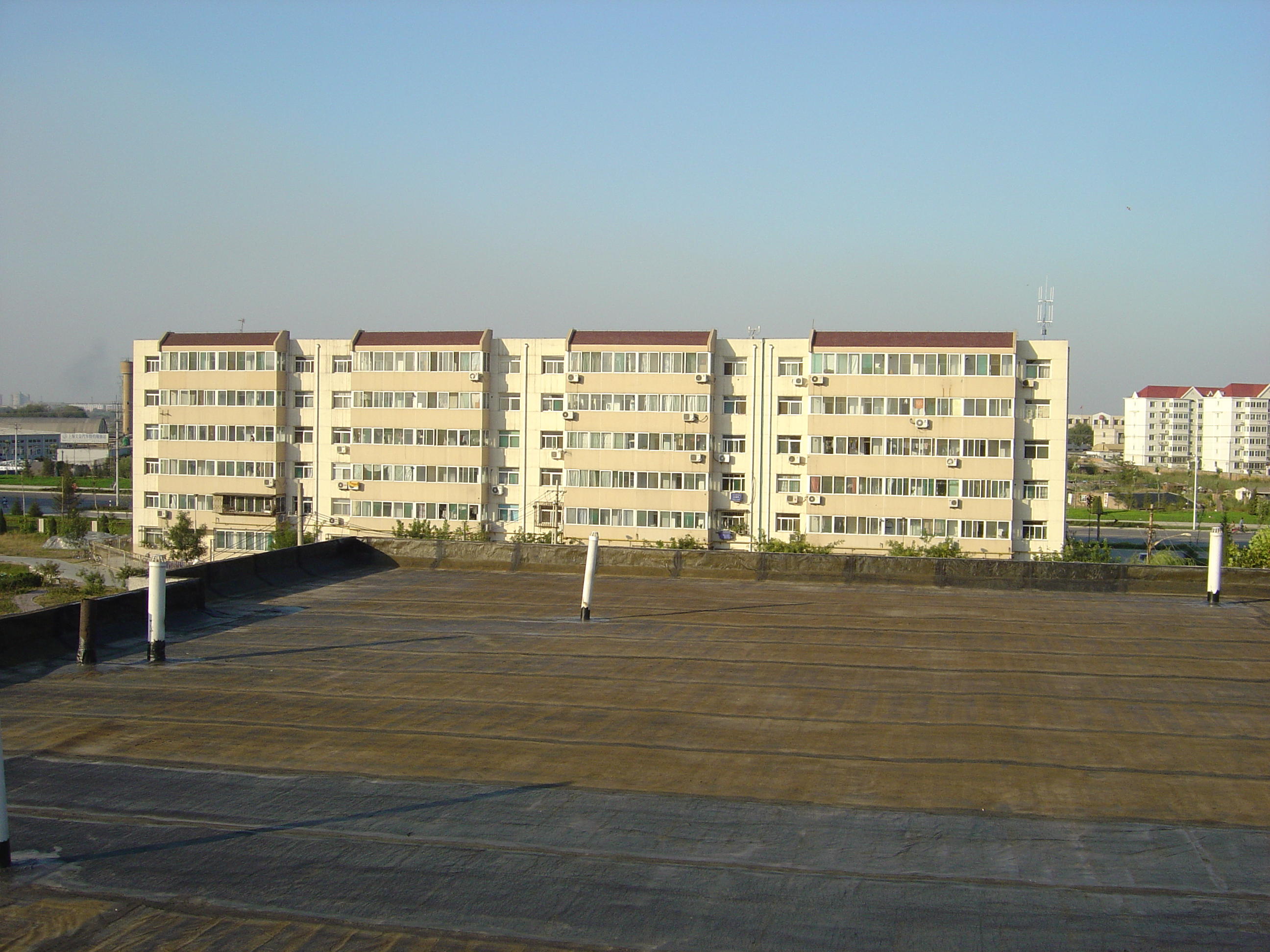
- Residential area on the northeast of the subdistrict, 2003

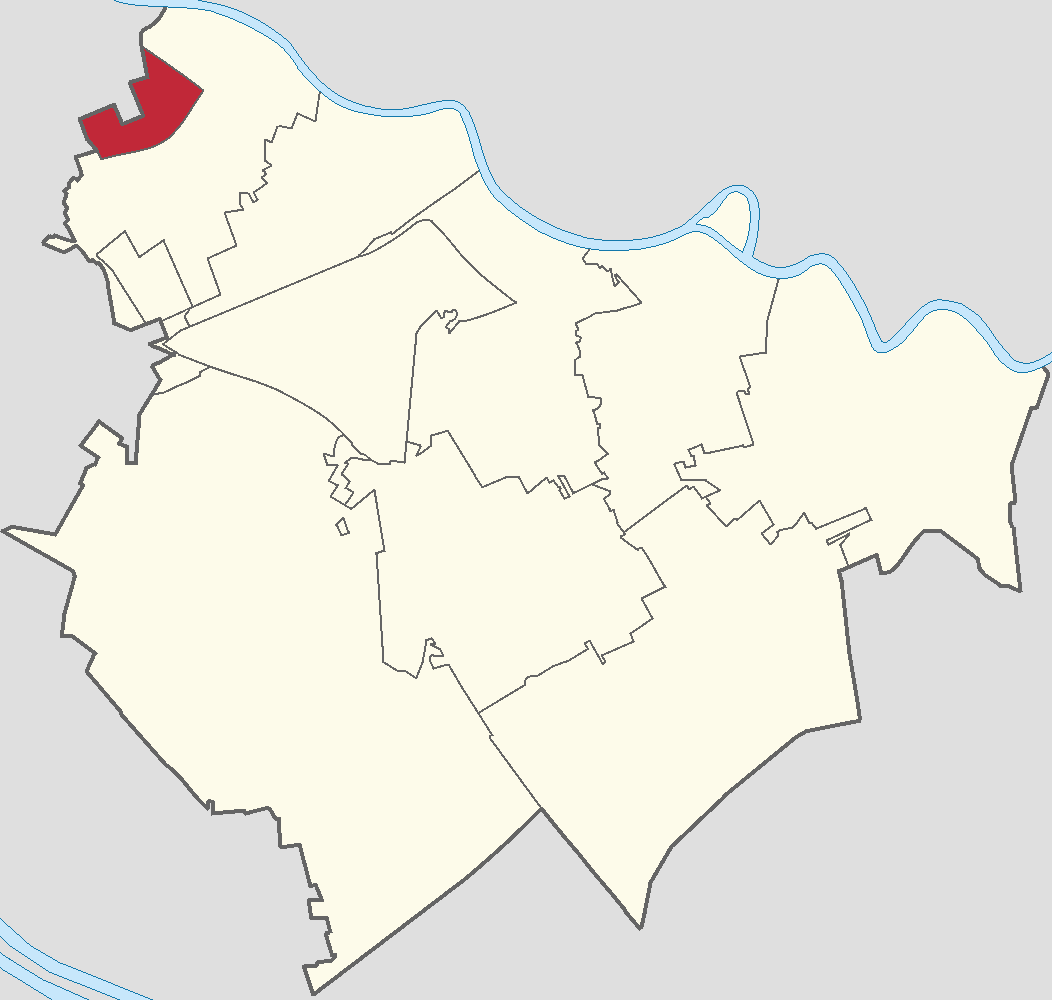
- Location of Shuanglin Subdistrict in Jinnan District

- Location within Tianjin Location within China
- Coordinates: 39°03′27″N 117°17′32″E
- Country: China
- Municipality: Tianjin
- District: Jinnan
- Village-level Divisions: 13 communities
- Elevation: 4 m (13 ft)
- Time zone: UTC+8 (CST)
- Postal code: 300380
- Area code: 022

Shuanglin Subdistrict (simplified Chinese: 双林街道; traditional Chinese: 雙林街道; pinyin: Shuānglín Jiēdào) is a subdistrict situated in the northwestern portion of Jinnan District, Tianjin, China. It borders Chentangzhuang and Liulin Subdistricts in its north, Shuanggang Town in its east and south, and Taihulu Subdistrict in its west.

The subdistrict was established in 2016. Its name can be translated as "Double Forests".

== Administrative divisions ==
As of 2022, Shuanglin Subdistrict administers 13 residential communities. They are listed in the table below:

Subdivision names	Name transliterations
沪青	Luqing
津铁惠苑	Jintie Huiyuan
三宝	Sanbao
天安	Tian'an
象博豪庭	Xiangbo Haoting
仕林苑	Shilin Yuan
海天馨苑	Haitian Xinyuan
福禧	Fuxi
林城佳苑	Lincheng Jiayuan
泓春	Hongchun
林荷	Linhe
成上城	Chengshang Cheng
天津职业技术师范大学	Tianjin Zhiye Jishu Shifan Daxue

== See also ==
- List of Township-level divisions of Tianjin
