= Jinnan, Tianjin =

Coordinates: 39°00′54″N 117°23′10″E

Jinnan 津南区
- District
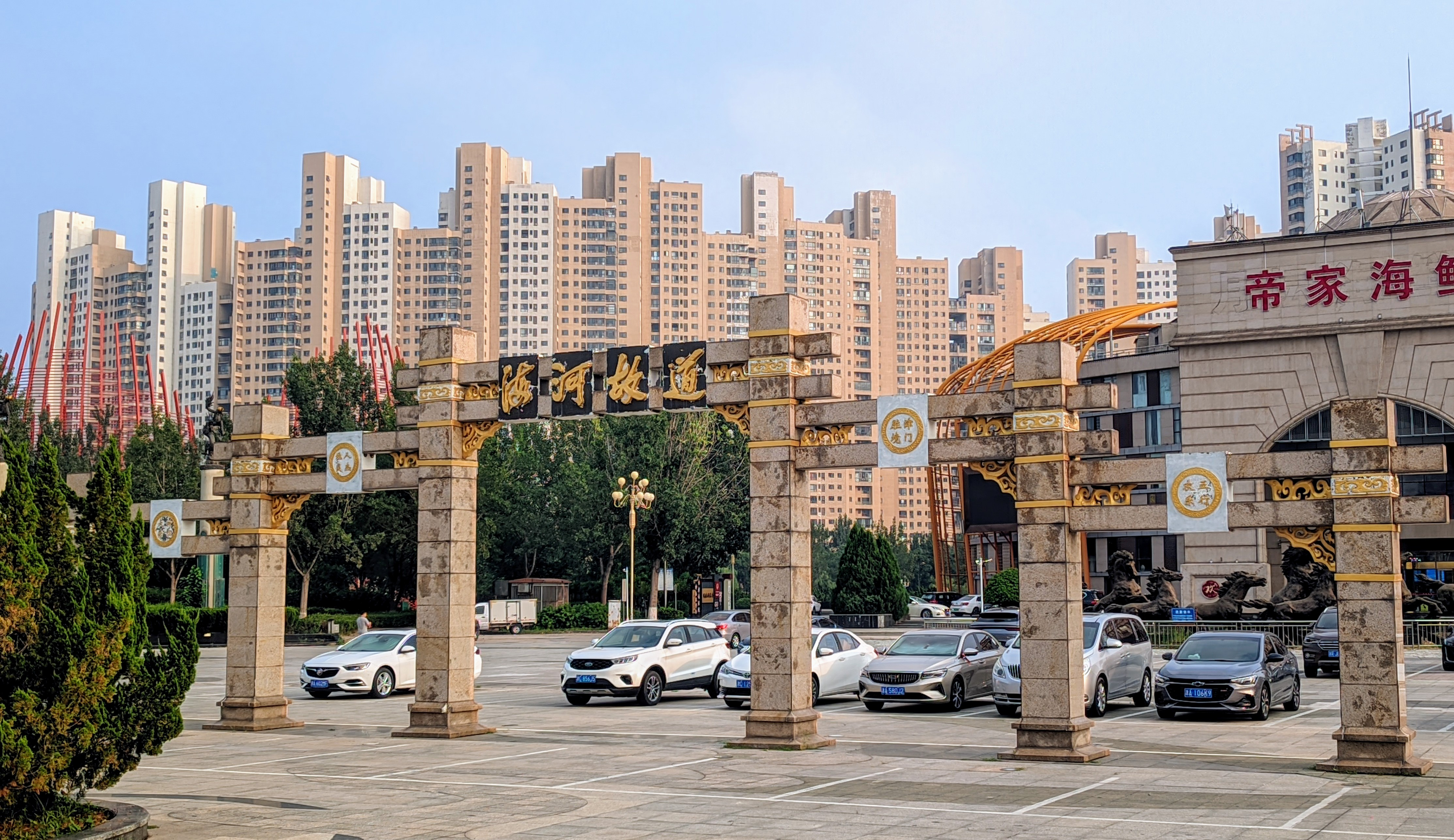
- Interactive map of Jinnan
- Country: People's Republic of China
- Municipality: Tianjin
- Township-level divisions: 8 towns

Area
  - Total: 380.4 km^{2} (146.9 sq mi)
- Elevation: 4 m (13 ft)

Population (2020 census)
  - Total: 928,066
  - Density: 2,440/km^{2} (6,319/sq mi)
- Time zone: UTC+8 (China Standard)
- Postal code: 300350
- Area code: 0022
Tianjin district map
Subdivisions of Tianjin
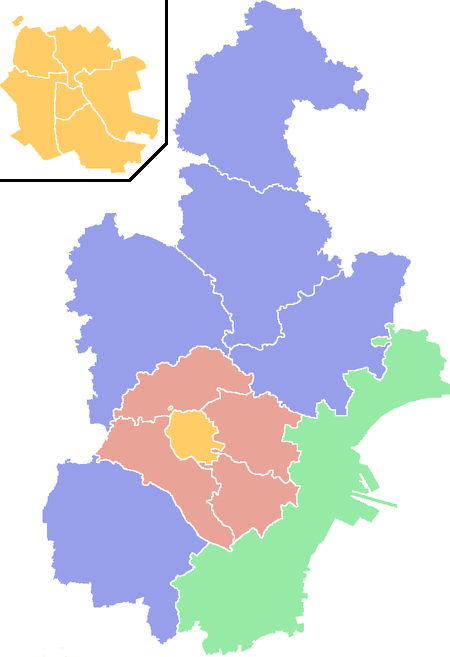
Core districts See inset
| 1 | Heping |
| 2 | Hedong |
| 3 | Hexi |
| 4 | Nankai |
| 5 | Hebei |
| 6 | Hongqiao |
Suburbs
| 7 | Dongli |
| 8 | Xiqing |
| 9 | Jinnan |
| 10 | Beichen |
Binhai and Rural
| 13 | Binhai | 14 | Ninghe |
| 11 | Wuqing | 15 | Jinghai |
| 12 | Baodi | 16 | Ji Zhou |
- Website: tjjn.gov.cn

Jinnan District (simplified Chinese: 津南区; traditional Chinese: 津南區; pinyin: Jīnnán Qū), formerly Nanjiao District (南郊区; 南郊區; Nánjiāo Qū; 'south suburb') is a district of Tianjin, People's Republic of China, located on the western bank of the lower reaches of the Hai River The name of the district literally means "South Tianjin" or "South of Tianjin", explained by its location relative to the urban core of Tianjin.

== Administrative divisions ==
In the year 2022, there are 3 subdistricts and 8 towns in the district:

| Name | Chinese (S) | Hanyu Pinyin | Population (2010) | Area (km^{2}) |
|---|---|---|---|---|
| Shuangxin Subdistrict | 双新街道 | Shuāngxīn Jiēdào | N/A | |
| Shuanglin Subdistrict | 双林街道 | Shuānglín Jiēdào | N/A | |
| Haitang Subdistrict | 海棠街道 | Hǎitáng Jiēdào | N/A | |
| Xianshuigu town | 咸水沽镇 | Xiánshuǐgū Zhèn | 148,602 | 60.39 |
| Beizhakou town | 北闸口镇 | Běizhákǒu Zhèn | 45,741 | 38.32 |
| Xinzhuang town | 辛庄镇 | Xīnzhuāng Zhèn | 38,666 | 30 |
| Balitai town | 八里台镇 | Bālǐtái Zhèn | 59,177 | 112.96 |
| Shuanggang town | 双港镇 | Shuānggǎng Zhèn | 103,185 | 35.1 |
| Xiaozhan town | 小站镇 | Xiǎozhàn Zhèn | 82,582 | |
| Gegu town | 葛沽镇 | Gégū Zhèn | 69,023 | |
| Shuangqiaohe town | 双桥河镇 | Shuāngqiáohé Zhèn | 37,193 | 22.3 |
| developmental & farming zones | | | 8,840 | |

== Transportation ==
=== Metro ===
Jinnan is currently served by one metro line operated by Tianjin Metro:

- Line 1 - Shuanglin

== Education ==
The International School of Tianjin is in this district.

== Climate ==
Jinnan District has a humid continental climate (Köppen climate classification Dwa). The average annual temperature in Jinnan is 12.6 °C (54.7 °F). The average annual rainfall is 521.2 mm (20.52 in) with July as the wettest month. The temperatures are highest on average in July, at around 26.5 °C (79.7 °F), and lowest in January, at around −3.7 °C (25.3 °F).

Climate data for Jinnan, elevation 2 m (6.6 ft), (1991–2020 normals, extremes 1981–2010)
| Month | Jan | Feb | Mar | Apr | May | Jun | Jul | Aug | Sep | Oct | Nov | Dec | Year |
|---|---|---|---|---|---|---|---|---|---|---|---|---|---|
| Record high °C (°F) | 13.4 (56.1) | 20.7 (69.3) | 30.4 (86.7) | 33.2 (91.8) | 38.3 (100.9) | 38.8 (101.8) | 41.3 (106.3) | 37.6 (99.7) | 35.4 (95.7) | 30.9 (87.6) | 23.2 (73.8) | 14.4 (57.9) | 41.3 (106.3) |
| Mean daily maximum °C (°F) | 2.0 (35.6) | 5.8 (42.4) | 12.8 (55.0) | 20.7 (69.3) | 26.7 (80.1) | 30.1 (86.2) | 31.4 (88.5) | 30.5 (86.9) | 26.8 (80.2) | 19.8 (67.6) | 10.7 (51.3) | 3.7 (38.7) | 18.4 (65.2) |
| Daily mean °C (°F) | −3.1 (26.4) | 0.1 (32.2) | 6.9 (44.4) | 14.6 (58.3) | 20.8 (69.4) | 24.8 (76.6) | 27.1 (80.8) | 26.1 (79.0) | 21.5 (70.7) | 14.2 (57.6) | 5.6 (42.1) | −1.1 (30.0) | 13.1 (55.6) |
| Mean daily minimum °C (°F) | −7.1 (19.2) | −4.1 (24.6) | 2.1 (35.8) | 9.3 (48.7) | 15.4 (59.7) | 20.4 (68.7) | 23.4 (74.1) | 22.4 (72.3) | 17.1 (62.8) | 9.5 (49.1) | 1.5 (34.7) | −4.8 (23.4) | 8.8 (47.8) |
| Record low °C (°F) | −21.7 (−7.1) | −18.1 (−0.6) | −9.4 (15.1) | −2.0 (28.4) | 6.5 (43.7) | 10.2 (50.4) | 16.5 (61.7) | 14.0 (57.2) | 4.4 (39.9) | −3.6 (25.5) | −9.8 (14.4) | −20.2 (−4.4) | −21.7 (−7.1) |
| Average precipitation mm (inches) | 2.5 (0.10) | 5.8 (0.23) | 6.3 (0.25) | 22.2 (0.87) | 38.1 (1.50) | 70.1 (2.76) | 152.6 (6.01) | 131.0 (5.16) | 50.1 (1.97) | 32.2 (1.27) | 13.0 (0.51) | 2.9 (0.11) | 526.8 (20.74) |
| Average precipitation days (≥ 0.1 mm) | 1.5 | 2.3 | 2.7 | 4.8 | 6.2 | 8.3 | 11.4 | 10.2 | 6.0 | 4.9 | 3.2 | 2.1 | 63.6 |
| Average snowy days | 2.4 | 2.3 | 0.9 | 0.1 | 0 | 0 | 0 | 0 | 0 | 0 | 1.3 | 2.3 | 9.3 |
| Average relative humidity (%) | 55 | 54 | 49 | 49 | 53 | 63 | 74 | 76 | 69 | 63 | 61 | 57 | 60 |
| Mean monthly sunshine hours | 176.5 | 181.5 | 232.2 | 247.3 | 270.0 | 236.7 | 206.3 | 210.6 | 213.5 | 203.3 | 166.7 | 165.3 | 2,509.9 |
| Percentage possible sunshine | 58 | 59 | 62 | 62 | 61 | 53 | 46 | 50 | 58 | 60 | 56 | 57 | 57 |
Source: China Meteorological Administration
