= Shuangxin Subdistrict =

Subdistrict of Tianjin, China

Shuangxin Subdistrict 双新街道
- Subdistrict
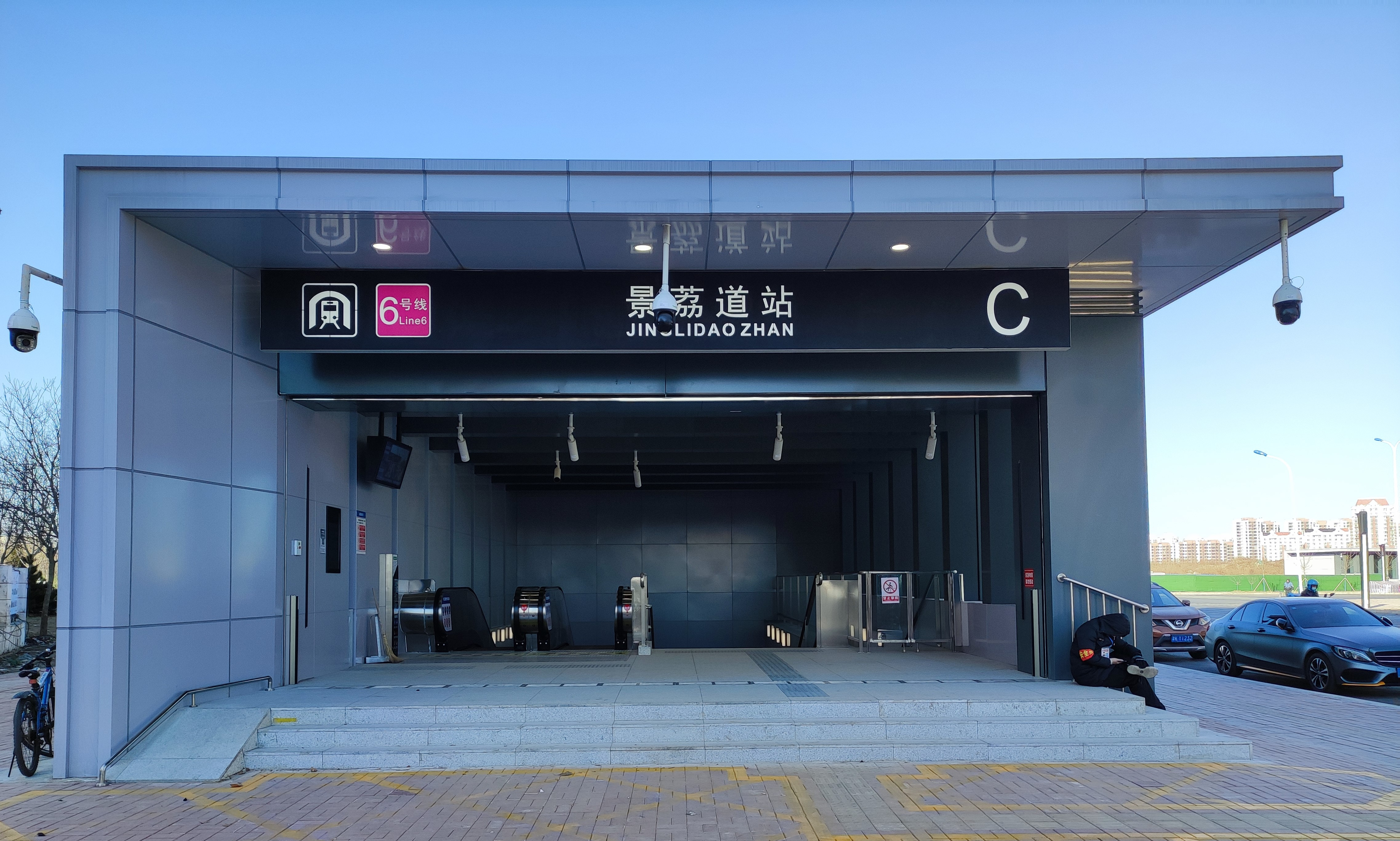
- Jinglidao Station of Tianjin Metro on the west of the subdistrict, 2021

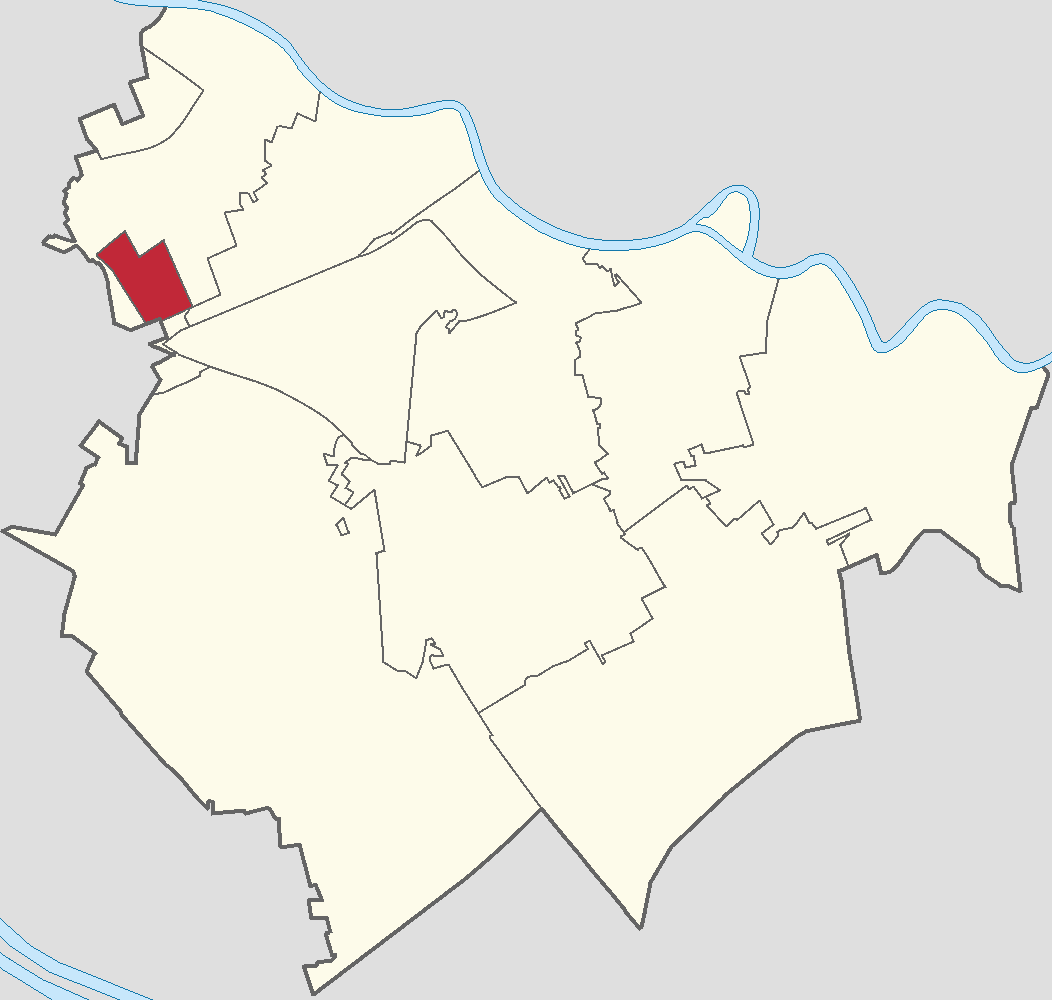
- Location of Shuangxin Subdistrict in Jinnan District

- Location within Tianjin Location within China
- Coordinates: 39°00′59″N 117°16′51″E
- Country: China
- Municipality: Tianjin
- District: Jinnan
- Village-level Divisions: 7 communities
- Elevation: 3 m (9.8 ft)
- Time zone: UTC+8 (CST)
- Postal code: 300385
- Area code: 022

Shuangxin Subdistrict (simplified Chinese: 双新街道; traditional Chinese: 雙新街道; pinyin: Shuāngxīn Jiēdào) is a subdistrict situated in the west side of Jinnan District, Tianjin, China. It shares border with Dasi Town in the south, and is surrounded by Shuanggang Town in other directions.

The subdistrict was established in 2015. Its name literally means "Double New".

== Administrative divisions ==
By the end of 2022, Shuangxin Subdistrict composes 7 residential communities. They are listed below:

Subdivision names	Name transliterations
昆香苑	Kunxiang Yuan
万盈家园	Wansheng Jiayuan
金兴家园	Jinxing Jiayuan
新景家园	Xinjing Jiayuan
尚科家园	Shangke Jiayuan
新薇家园	Xinwei Jiayuan
欣盛家园	Xinsheng Jiayuan

== See also ==
- List of Township-level divisions of Tianjin
