= Taihu Road Subdistrict =

Taihu Road Subdistrict 太湖路街道
- Subdistrict
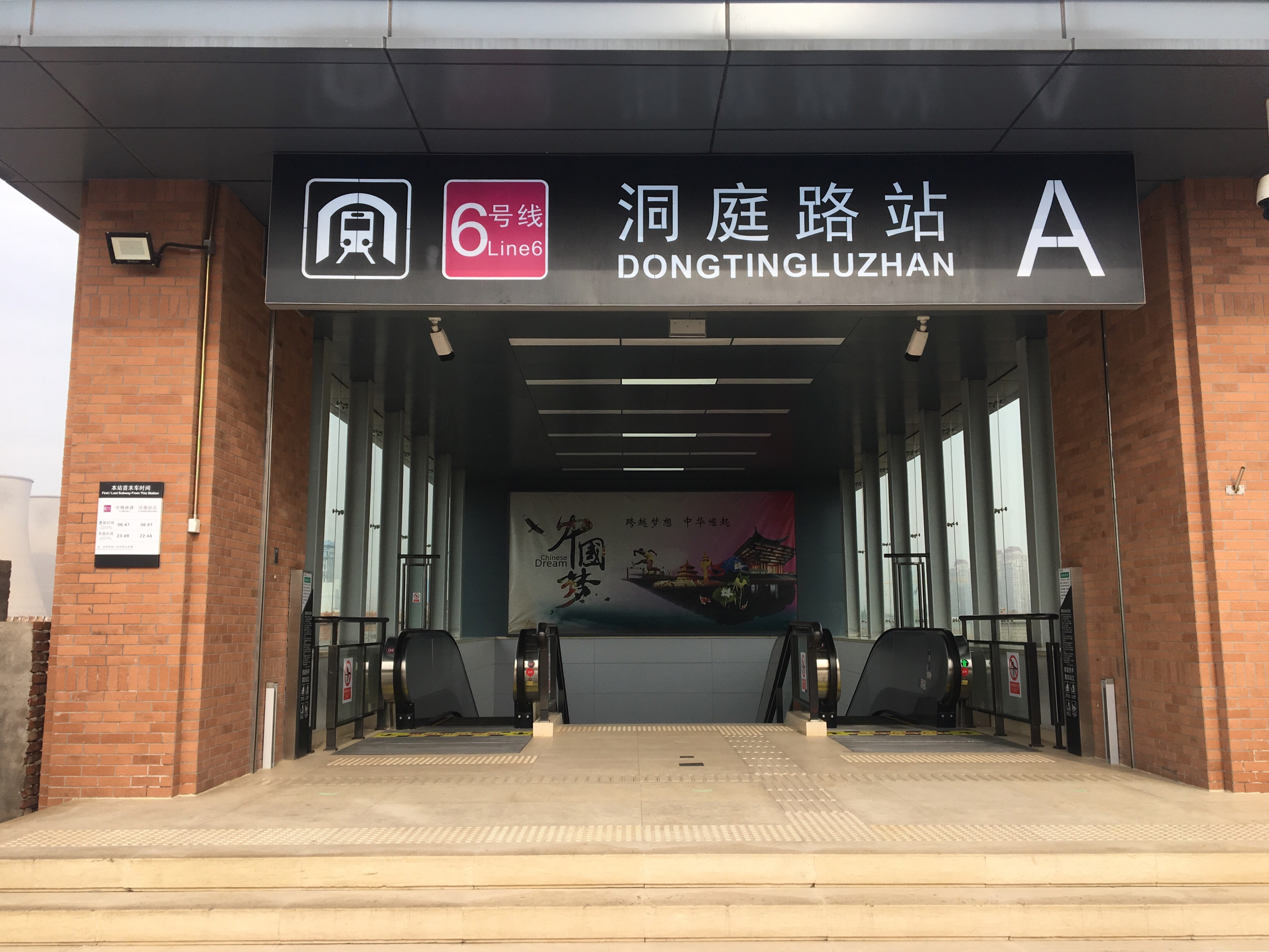
- Dongting Road Subway Station on the western side of the subdistrict, 2019

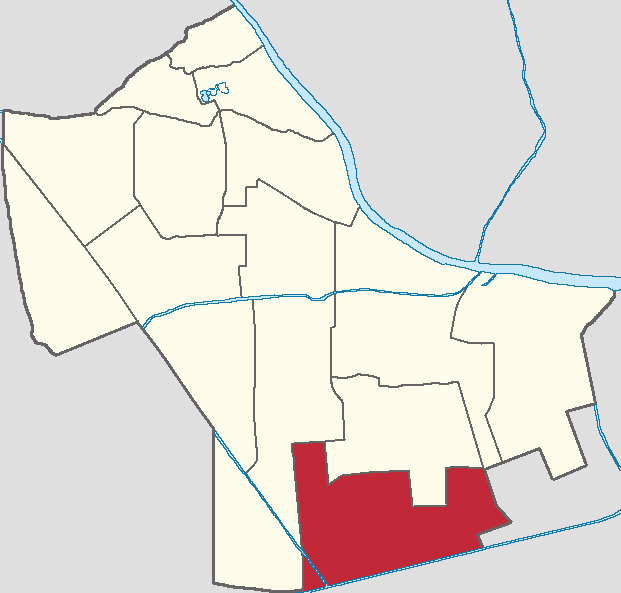
- Location within Hexi District

- Location within Tianjin Location within China
- Coordinates: 39°02′08″N 117°14′03″E
- Country: China
- Municipality: Tianjin
- District: Hexi
- Village-level Divisions: 4 communities

Area
  - Total: 4.59 km^{2} (1.77 sq mi)
- Elevation: 4 m (13 ft)
- Time zone: UTC+8 (China Standard)
- Postal code: 300202
- Area code: 022

Taihu Road Subdistrict (Chinese: 太湖路街道; pinyin: Tàihúlù Jiēdào) is a subdistrict located in the south of Hexi District, Tianjin, China. It borders Jianshan and Donghai Subdistricts in its north, Shuanglin Farm in its east and south, and Meijiang Subdistrict in its west.

The subdistrict was formed in 2017. It is named after Taihu Road, which in turn gets its name from Taihu (Chinese: 太湖; lit. 'Grand Lake') that is located in the southwest part of the subdistrict.

== Geography ==
Taihu Road Subdistrict is bounded by Waihuan River in the south, Weijin River in the west, and Changtai Diversion river runs through its werstern portion.

== Administrative divisions ==
In the year 2021, Taihu Road Subdistrict oversaw 4 residential communities. They are, by the order of their Administrative Division Codes:

Subdivision names	Name transliterations
仁湖里	Renhuli
秀江里	Xiujiangli
雀榕园	Querongyuan
惠众家园	Huizhong Jiayuan
