= Xiaozhan =

Town of Tianjin, China

Xiaozhan Town 小站镇
- Town
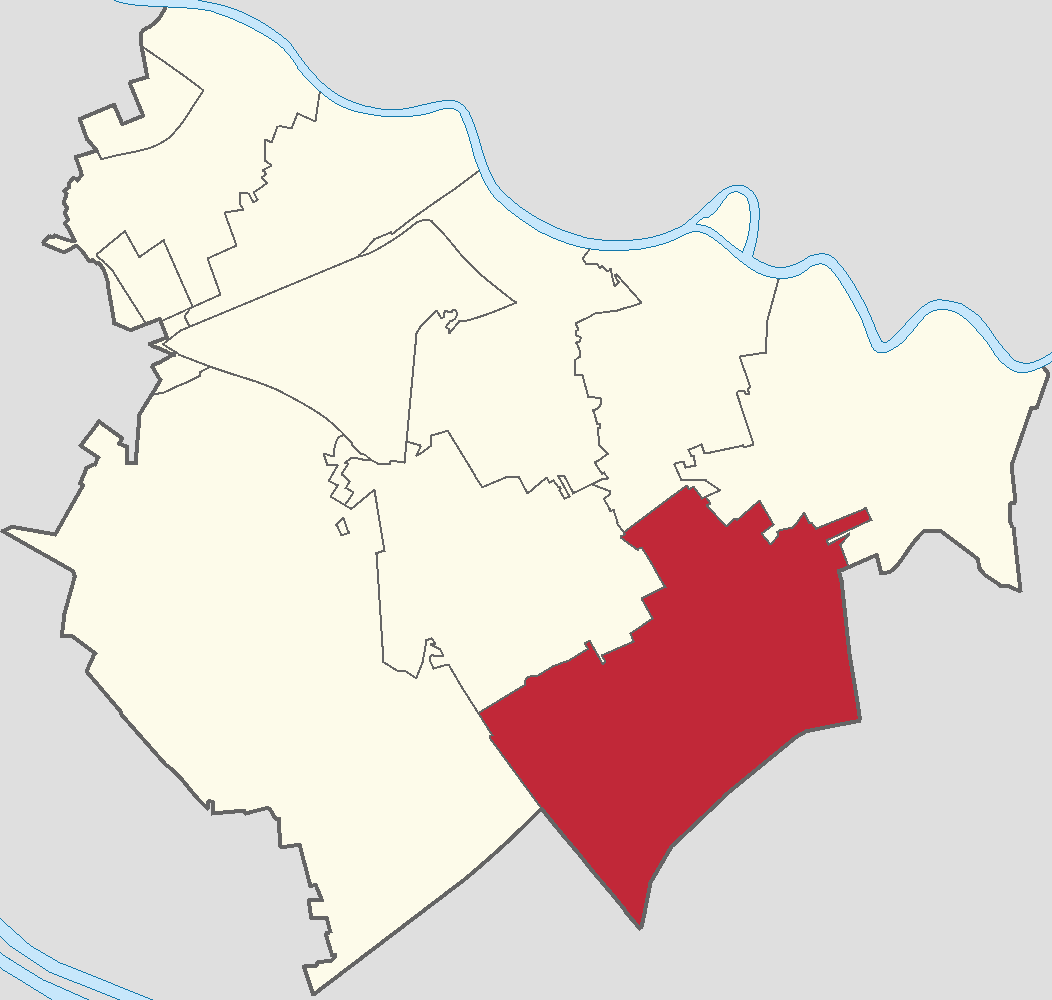
- Location of Xiaozhan within Jinnan District

- Location within Tianjin Location within China
- Coordinates: 38°54′53″N 117°25′49″E
- Country: China
- Municipality: Tianjin
- District: Jinnan
- Village-level Divisions: 12 communities 18 villages

Area
  - Total: 55.99 km^{2} (21.62 sq mi)
- Elevation: 3 m (9.8 ft)

Population (2010)
  - Total: 82,582
  - Density: 1,475/km^{2} (3,820/sq mi)
- Time zone: UTC+8 (CST)
- Postal code: 300353
- Area code: 022

Xiaozhan Town (simplified Chinese: 小站镇; traditional Chinese: 小站鎮; pinyin: Xiǎozhàn Zhèn) is a town situated on the southeast of Jinnan District, Tianjin, China. It shares borders with Shuangqiaohe and Gegu Towns to its north, Gulin and Dagang Subdistricts to its east, Zhongtang and Balitai Towns to its southwest, and Beizhakou Town to its northwest. In 2010 its population is 82,582.

The name "Xiaozhan" literally means "Small Station".

== History ==
History of Xiaozhan Town
Years	Status	Belongs to
1875 - 1948	Xiaozhan Town	
1948 - 1949	Xiaozhan City	
1949 - 1958	Xiaozhan Town	
1958 - 1962	Xiaozhan People's Commune	Hexi District, Tianjin
1962 - 1985	Xiaozhan People's Commune	Nanjiao District, Tianjin
1985 - 1992	Xiaozhan Town	Nanjiao District, Tianjin
1992 - present	Xiaozhan Town	Jinnan District, Tianjin

== Administrative divisions ==
In 2022, Xiaozhan Town composes 30 subdivisions, of those 12 are residential communities and 18 are villages. They are listed below:

Subdivision names	Name transliterations	Type
中山路	Zhongshan Lu	Community
德胜道	Desheng Dao	Community
和平路	Heping Lu	Community
红旗路	Hongqi Lu	Community
减河南	Jianhe Nan	Community
水榭花都	Shuixie Huadu	Community
福堤园	Fudi Yuan	Community
竹新苑	Zhuxin Yuan	Community
紫淼新苑	Ziyuan Xinyuan	Community
怡润	Yirun	Community
小站黄台工业园区	Xiaozhan Huangtai Gongye Yuanqu	Community
天津小站工业区	Tianjin Xiaozhan Gongyequ	Community
盛字营	Shengzi Ying	Village
传字营	Chuanzi Ying	Village
幸福	Xingfu	Village
西花园	Xi Huayuan	Village
西沟	Xi Gou	Village
东大站	Dong Dazhan	Village
营盘圈	Yingpanquan	Village
新开路	Xinkai Lu	Village
南副营	Nanfu Ying	Village
四道沟	Sidao Gou	Village
东闸	Dong Zha	Village
前营	Qian Ying	Village
坨子地	Tuozidi	Village
东西庄房	Dong Xizhuangfang	Village
迎新	Yingxin	Village
会馆	Huiguan	Village
操场河	Caochang He	Village
周庄房	Zhou Zhuangfang	Village

== See also ==
- List of township-level divisions of Tianjin
