= Gegu =

Town of Tianjin, China

Gegu Town 葛沽镇
- Town
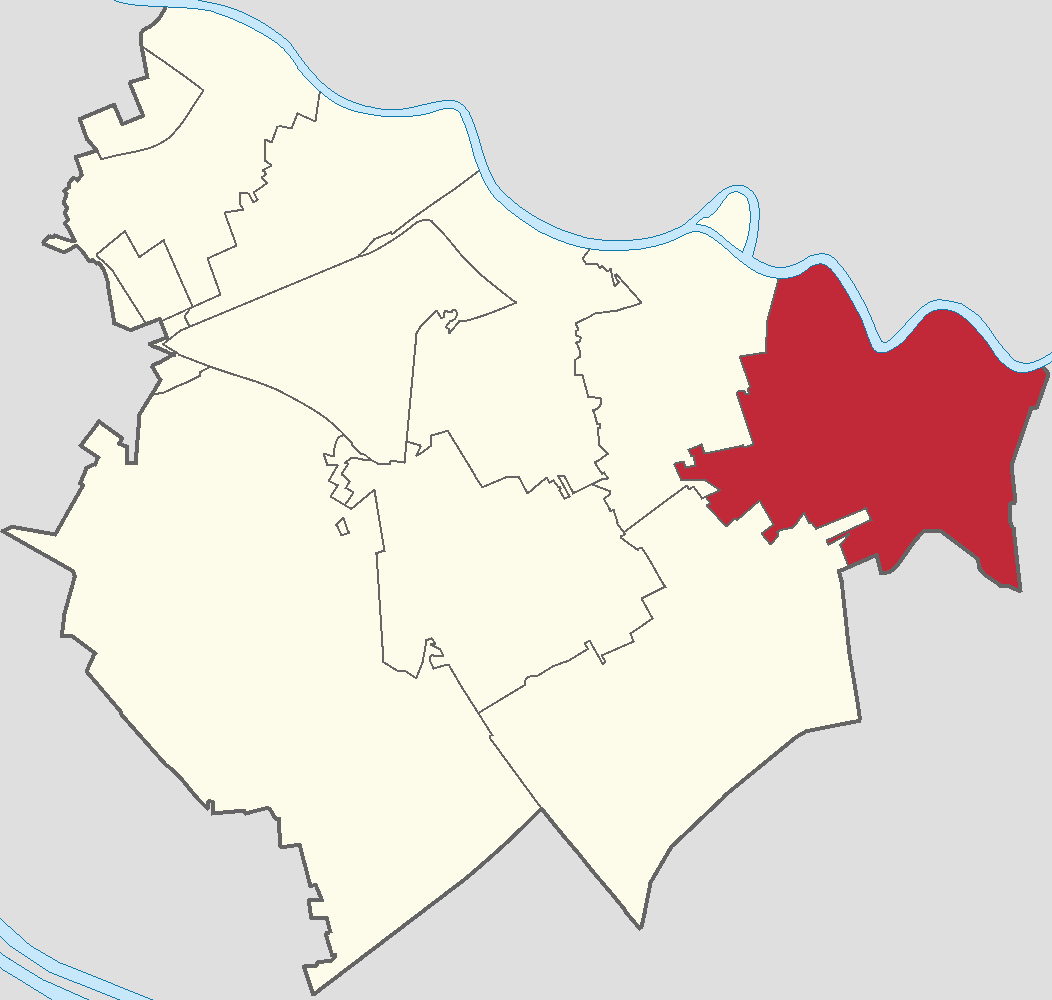
- Location within Jinnan District

- Location within Tianjin Location within China
- Coordinates: 38°59′15″N 117°30′09″E
- Country: China
- Municipality: Tianjin
- District: Jinnan
- Village-level Divisions: 15 communities 20 villages

Area
  - Total: 46.85 km^{2} (18.09 sq mi)
- Elevation: 2 m (6.6 ft)

Population (2010)
  - Total: 69,023
  - Density: 1,473/km^{2} (3,816/sq mi)
- Time zone: UTC+8 (CST)
- Postal code: 300352
- Area code: 022

Gegu Town (simplified Chinese: 葛沽镇; traditional Chinese: 葛沽鎮; pinyin: Gégū Zhèn) is a town located in the northeastern portion of Jinnan District, Tianjin, China. It borders Hujiayuan and Wuxia Subdistricts to the north, Xincheng Town to the east, Gulin Subdistrict and Xiaozhan Town to the south, and Shuangqiaohe Town to the west. It has a population of 69,023 as of 2010.

The name Gegu can be translated as "Ge's Creek"

== Geography ==
Gegu Town is located on the southern bank of Hai River, with Dagu Paiwu River passing through the south of the town. Both Jinjin Expressway and Changchun–Shenzhen Expressway are connected to the town.

== History ==
Timetable of Gegu Town
Years	Status	Belong to
1948–1949	Gegu City	
1949–1962	Gegu Town	
1962–1983	Gegu People's Commune	Nanjiao District, Tianjin
1983–1985	Gegu Township	Nanjiao District, Tianjin
1985–1992	Gegu Town	Nanjiao District, Tianjin
1992–present	Gegu Town	Jinnan District, Tianjin

== Administrative divisions ==
By the end of 2022, Gegu Town is formed from 35 subdivisions, with 15 residential communities and 20 villages:

Subdivision names	Name transliterations	Type
金龙里	Jinlong Li	Community
东风里	Dongfeng Li	Community
泽水园	Zeshui Li	Community
荣水园第一	Rongshui Yuan Diyi	Community
荣水园第二	Rongshui Yuan Di'er	Community
荣水园第三	Rongshui Yuan Disan	Community
慈水园第一	Cishui Yuan Diyi	Community
慈水园第二	Cishui Yuan Di'er	Community
慈水园第三	Cishui Yuan Disan	Community
慈水园第四	Cishui Yuan Disi	Community
盘沽馨苑	Pangu Xinyuan	Community
盘泽馨苑	Panze Xinyuan	Community
绿水园	Lüshui Yuan	Community
碧水园	Bishui Yuan	Community
葛沽镇冶金工业园	Gegu Zhen Yejin Gongye Yuan	Community
葛沽一村	Gegu Yicun	Village
葛沽二村	Gegu Ercun	Village
葛沽三村	Gegu Sancun	Village
曾庄	Zeng Zhuang	Village
北元	Bei Yuan	Village
新房	Xinfang	Village
盘沽	Pangu	Village
十间房	Shijianfang	Village
小高庄	Xiaogao Zhuang	Village
邓岑子	Deng Cenzi	Village
辛庄子	Xin Zhuangzi	Village
杨岑子	Yang Cenzi	Village
殷庄	Yin Zhuang	Village
东埂	Donggeng	Village
杨惠庄	Yanghui Zhuang	Village
西关	Xiguan	Village
南辛房	Nan Xinfang	Village
三合	Sanhe	Village
石闸	Shizha	Village
九道沟	Jiudaogou	Village

== See also ==
- List of township-level divisions of Tianjin
