= Haitang Subdistrict, Tianjin =

Subdistrict of Tianjin, China

Haitang Subdistrict 海棠街道
- Subdistrict
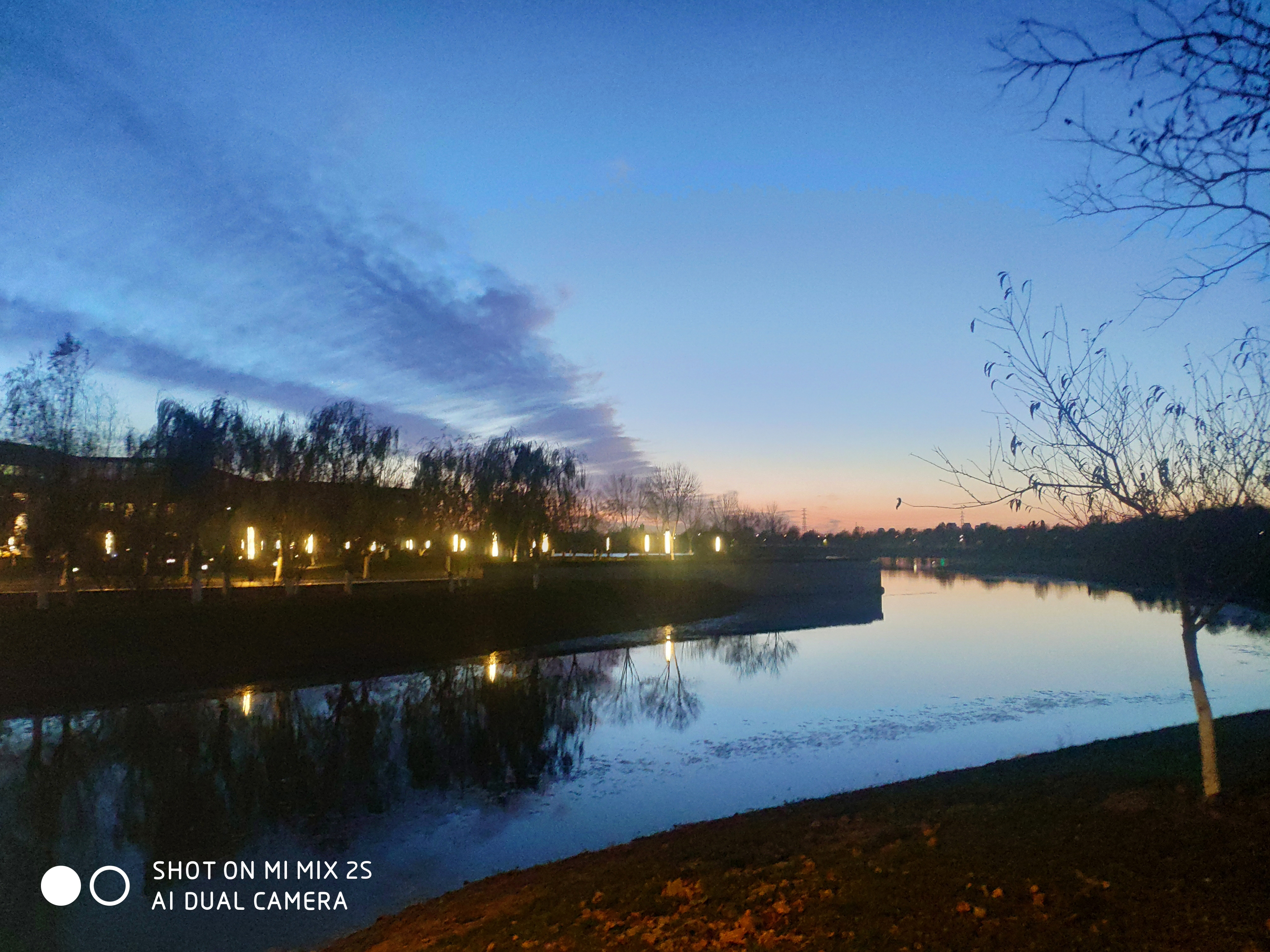
- Peiyang Campus of Tianjin University on the western part of the subdistrict, 2019

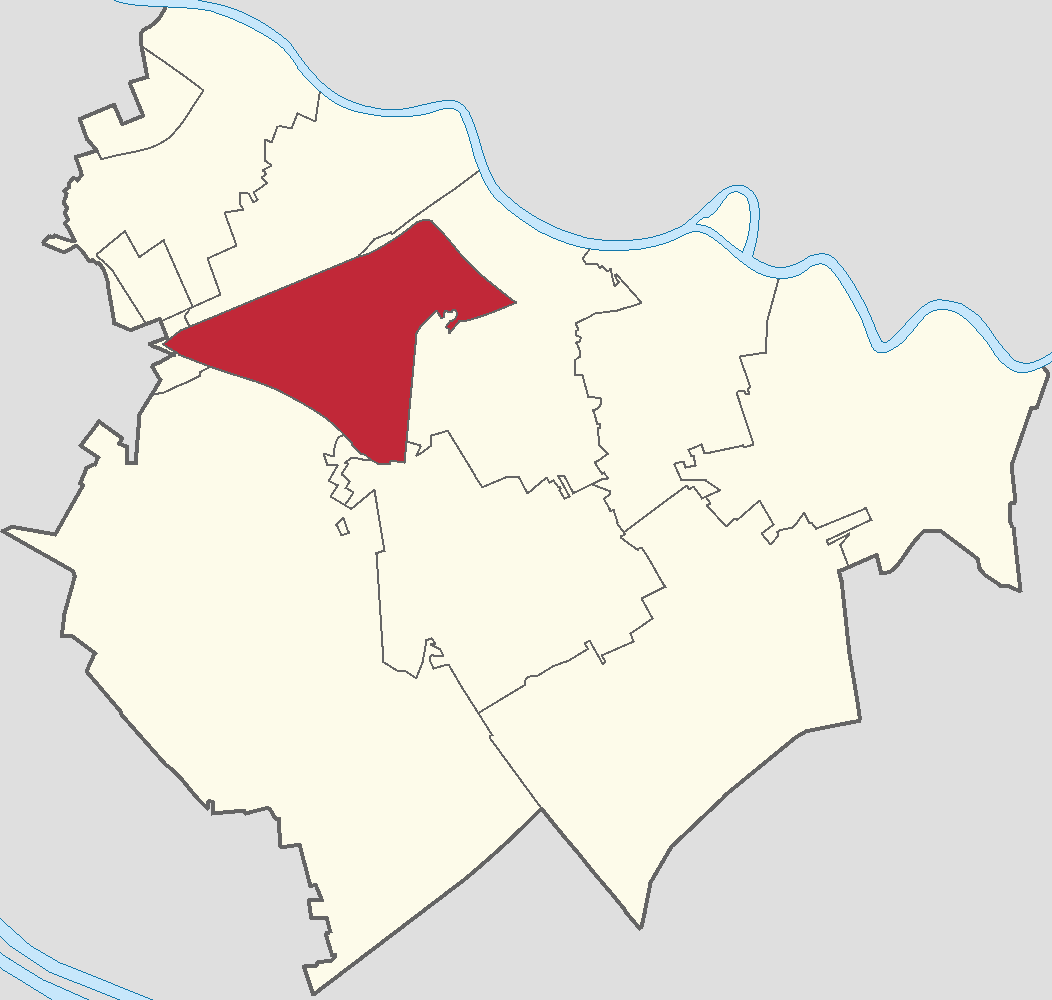
- Location within Jinnan District

- Location within Tianjin Location within China
- Coordinates: 38°59′41″N 117°21′03″E
- Country: China
- Municipality: Tianjin
- District: Jinnan
- Village-level Divisions: 18 communities
- Elevation: 3 m (9.8 ft)
- Time zone: UTC+8 (CST)
- Postal code: 300355
- Area code: 022

Haitang Subdistrict (Chinese: 海棠街道; pinyin: Hǎitáng Jiēdào) is a subdistrict within Jinnan District, Tianjin, China. It shares a border with Shuanggang and Xinzhuang Towns to its northwest, Xianshuigu Town to its east, Beizhakou Town to its southeast, and Balitai Town to its southwest.

The subdistrict was created in 2021. It is named after Chinese crabapple.

== Administrative divisions ==
In 2022, Haitang Subdistrict is divided into 18 residential communities. They are listed in the table below:

Subdivision names	Name transliterations
知香园	Zhixiang Yuan
景新花园	Jingxin Huayuan
文德花园	Wende Huayuan
品尚花园	Pinshang Huayuan
滨香园	Binxiang Yuan
南开大学	Nankai Daxue
天南小镇	Tiannan Xiaozhen
天津大学	Tianjin Daxue
天津中德应用技术大学	Tianjin Zhongde Yingyong Jishu Daxue
天津电子信息职业技术学院	Tianjin Dianzi Xinxi Zhiya Jishu Xueyuan
天津轻工职业技术学院	Tianjin Qinggong Zhiye Jishu Xueyuan
天津现代职业技术学院	Tianjin Xiandai Zhiye Jishu Xueyuan
天津市仪表无线电工业学校	Tianjishi Yibiao Wuxiandian Gongye Xuexiao
天津海运职业学院	Tianjin Haiyun Zhiye Xueyuan
天津机电工艺学院	Tianjin Jidian Gongyi Xueyuan
天津机电职业技术学院	Tianjin Jidian Zhiye Jishu Xueyuan
天津职业大学	Tianjin Zhiye Daxue
天津商务职业学院	Tianjin Shangwu Zhiye Xueyuan

== See also ==
- List of Township-level divisions of Tianjin
