= Xianshuigu =

Town of Tianjin, China

Xianshuigu Town 咸水沽镇
- Town
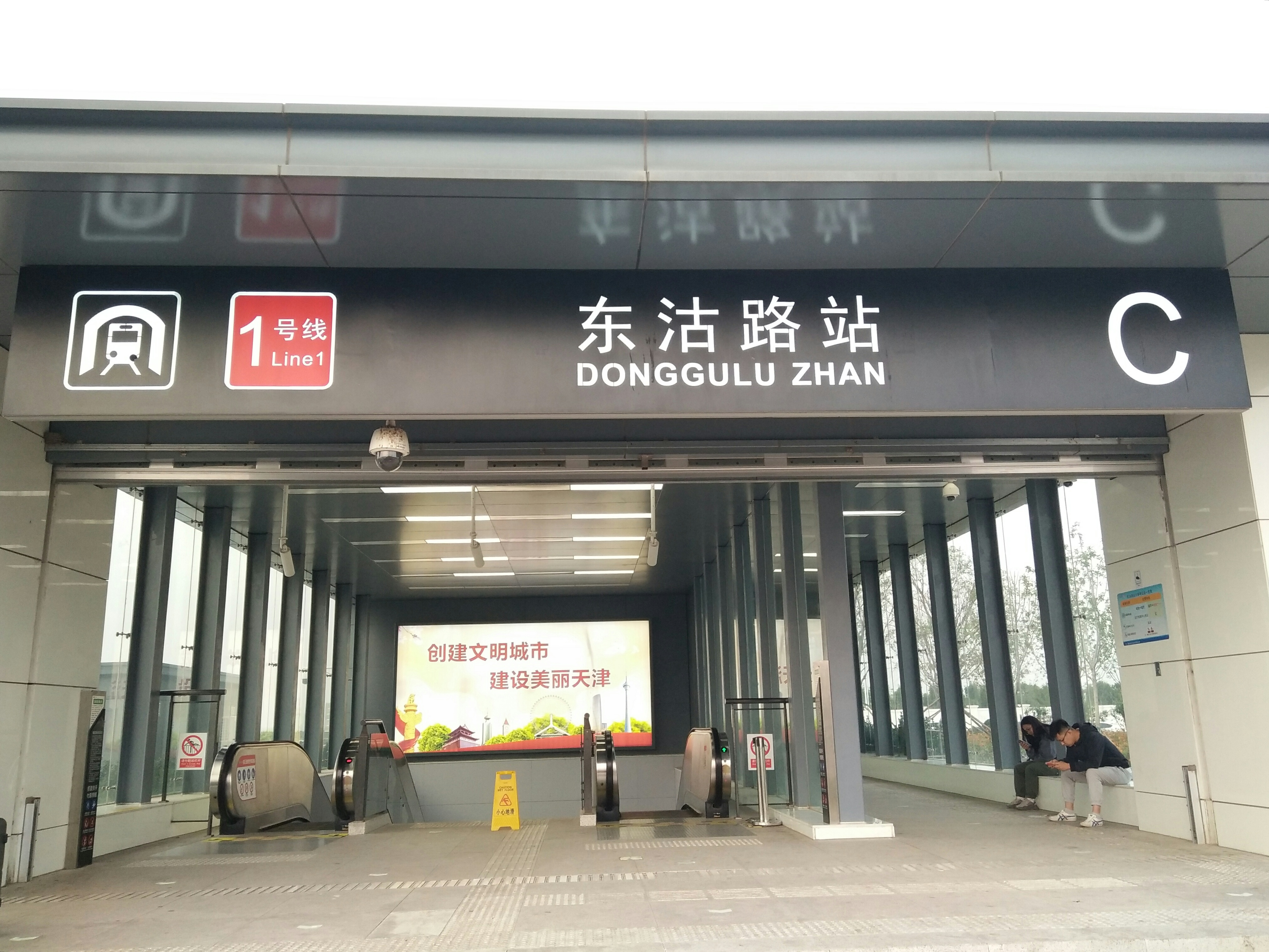
- Donggulu Station of Tianjin Metro on the north of the town, 2020

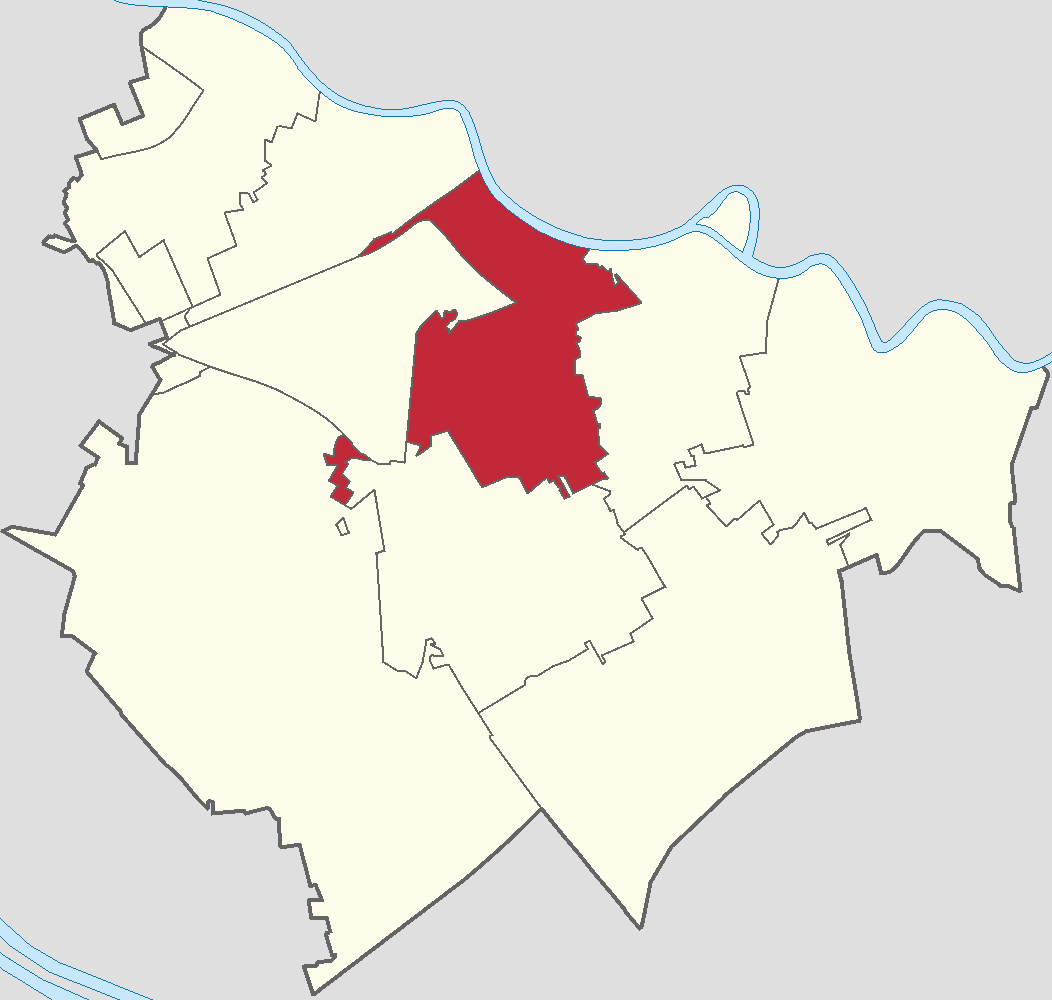
- Location of XIanshuigu Town in Jinnan District

- Location within Tianjin Location within China
- Coordinates: 38°58′43″N 117°23′19″E
- Country: China
- Municipality: Tianjin
- District: Jinnan
- Village-level Divisions: 29 communities 27 villages

Area
  - Total: 60.39 km^{2} (23.32 sq mi)
- Elevation: 3 m (9.8 ft)

Population (2010)
  - Total: 148,602
  - Density: 2,461/km^{2} (6,373/sq mi)
- Time zone: UTC+8 (CST)
- Postal code: 300350
- Area code: 022

Xianshuigu Town (simplified Chinese: 咸水沽镇; traditional Chinese: 鹹水沽鎮; pinyin: Xiánshuǐgū Zhèn) is a town in Jinnan District, Tianjin, China. It is located in the south of Jinqiao Subdistrict, west of Gegu Town, north of Beizhakou Town, and east of Xinzhuang Town and Haitang Subdistrict. The town also has an enclave south of Haitang Subdistrict. Its population is 148,602 as of 2010.

The town is recorded as having been a coastal town on the Bay of Bohai around AD 500, but was 18 miles (30 km) inland by the mid-19th century. Its name Xianshuigu (Chinese: 咸水沽; lit. 'Salty Creek Port') first appeared in record in the year 1377.

== Geography ==
Xianshuigu Town is situated on the south of Hai River, with Laohai River and Yueya River both traverse through it. Jinjin Expressway passes through the south of the town.

== History ==
History of Xianshuigu Town
| Time | Status | Belong to |
|---|---|---|
| Ming and Qing Dynasties | Xianshuigu | Tianjin County |
| 1912 - 1945 | Xianshuigu Township | Tianjin County |
| 1945 - 1946 | Xianshuigu Township | 6th District, Jingu County |
| 1946 - 1948 | Xianshuigu Township | Jinnan County |
| 1948 - 1955 | Xianshuigu City | Jinnan County |
| 1955 - 1958 | Xianshuigu City | Nanjiao District, Tianjin |
| 1958 - 1961 | Part of Meiman People's Commune | Hexi District, Tianjin |
| 1961 - 1962 | Xianshuigu People's Commune | Hexi District, Tianjin |
| 1962 - 1966 | Xianshuigu People's Commune | Nanjiao District, Tianjin |
| 1966 - 1980 | Yonghong Town | Nanjiao District, Tianjin |
| 1980 - 1992 | Xianshuigu Town (Xianshuigu Township was added in 1985; Nanyang Town in 2001) | Nanjiao District, Tianjin |
| 1992 - present | Xianshuigu Town (Xianshuigu Township was added in 1985; Nanyang Town in 2001) | Jinnan District, Tianjin |

== Administrative divisions ==
In 2022, Xianshuigu Town is divided into 56 subdivisions, consisting of the following 29 residential communities and 27 villages:

| Subdivision names | Name transliterations | Type |
|---|---|---|
| 祥福里 | Xiangfu Li | Community |
| 红星里 | Hongxing Li | Community |
| 红旗楼 | Hongqi Lou | Community |
| 惠苑里 | Huiyuan Li | Community |
| 育才里 | Yucai Li | Community |
| 众合里 | Zhonghe Li | Community |
| 光明楼 | Guangming Lou | Community |
| 永安里 | Yong'an Li | Community |
| 新丰里 | Xinfeng Li | Community |
| 益华里 | Yihua Li | Community |
| 新业里 | Xinye Li | Community |
| 金石里 | Jinshi Li | Community |
| 宝业馨苑 | Baoye Xinyuan | Community |
| 月牙河 | Yueya He | Community |
| 丰达园 | Fengda Yuan | Community |
| 丰收路 | Fengshou Lu | Community |
| 金华南 | Jinhua Nan | Community |
| 金华北 | Jinhua Bei | Community |
| 新城 | Xincheng | Community |
| 沽上 | Gushang | Community |
| 鑫洋园 | Xinyang Yuan | Community |
| 米兰 | Milan | Community |
| 盈畅园 | Shengchang Yuan | Community |
| 紫江馨苑 | Zijiang Xinyuan | Community |
| 金芳园 | Jinfang Yuan | Community |
| 金悦 | Jinyue | Community |
| 合力园 | Heli Yuan | Community |
| 雅居园 | Yaju Yuan | Community |
| 天津海河工业区 | Tianjin Haihe Gongyequ | Community |
| 东张庄 | Dongzhang Zhuang | Village |
| 吴家稻地 | Wujia Daodi | Village |
| 池家稻地 | Chijia Daodi | Village |
| 刘家码头 | Liujia Matou | Village |
| 王家场 | Wangjia Chang | Village |
| 头道沟 | Toudao Gou | Village |
| 周辛庄 | Zhouxin Zhuang | Village |
| 秦庄子 | Qin Zhuangzi | Village |
| 上刘庄 | Shangliu Zhuang | Village |
| 下郭庄 | Xiaguo Zhuang | Village |
| 四里沽 | Siligu | Village |
| 李庄子 | Li Zhuangzi | Village |
| 潘庄子 | Pan Zhuangzi | Village |
| 胜利 | Shengli | Village |
| 惠丰 | Huifeng | Village |
| 新兴 | Xinli | Village |
| 耀华 | Yaohua | Village |
| 同济 | Tongji | Village |
| 裕民 | Yumin | Village |
| 韩城桥 | Hangchengqiao | Village |
| 南洋 | Nanyang | Village |
| 五登房 | Wudengfang | Village |
| 二道桥 | Erdaoqiao | Village |
| 北洋 | Beiyang | Village |
| 苑庄 | Yuan Zhuang | Village |
| 赵北庄 | Zhaobei Zhuang | Village |
| 田咀 | Tianju | Village |

== See also ==
- List of township-level divisions of Tianjin
