= Tianjin British Municipal Council =

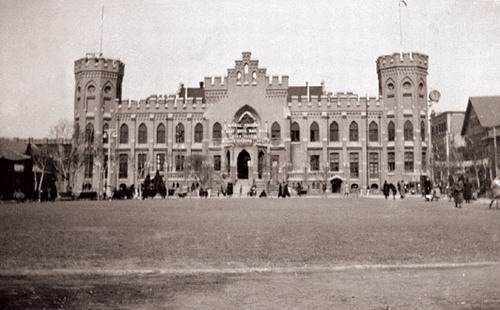
Gordon Hall, former Tianjin British Concession Works Bureau Building

The Tianjin British Municipal Council (Chinese：天津英租界工部局) Also translated as the British Ministry of Works in Tianjin was the highest administrative authority established within the British Concession in Tianjin and served as the executive body of the concession’s Board of Directors. The Council was founded in the first year of the Tongzhi reign of the Qing dynasty (1862). Its headquarters was located in Gordon Hall(Tianjin), situated on the east side of Victoria Road (present-day Jiefang North Road (Tianjin) in Heping, Tianjin) and to the north of Victoria Garden (now Jiefang North Road (Tianjin)) within the concession.

In the twenty-fifth year of the Guangxu reign (1899), an additional body known as the Tianjin British Extension Municipal Council was established to administer the expanded areas of the concession. Its organizational structure was largely similar to that of the original Municipal Council.In January 1919, the original concession, the extended concession, and the extramural areas were merged and placed under a single unified Tianjin British Municipal Council, which continued to operate under the existing institutional framework.

== Formation ==
At the early stage of the establishment of the British Concession in Tianjin, the concession was directly administered by the British Consulate in Tianjin. However, as the number of foreign residents in the concession gradually increased, administrative authority was progressively transferred to the British expatriate community itself, leading to the establishment of a local administrative system.In the first year of the Tongzhi reign of the Qing dynasty (1862), the British Concession in Tianjin took the lead in establishing a Board of Directors within the concession, with the Tianjin British Municipal Council serving as its executive body.

== Board of directors ==
The Board of Directors of the British Concession in Tianjin functioned as the principal governing and decision-making body within the concession. Directors were elected by taxpayers residing in the concession, serving one-year terms, after which the entire board was subject to re-election.Prior to the twenty-fifth year of the Qing dynasty Guangxu reign (1899), the Board consisted of five directors, all of whom were British nationals. The number of directors was later increased to nine. In the twenty-eighth year of the Qing dynasty Guangxu reign (1902), when the American Concession in Tianjin was incorporated into the British concession in Tianjin, it was stipulated that at least five members of the Board must be British nationals and at least one must be an American.Subsequently, the Regulations of the British Municipal Council at Tientsin (1918) required that the Board consist of no fewer than five directors, of whom at least five had to be British. In 1926, two Chinese directors were added to the Board, and in 1927, the number of Chinese directors increased to three. After 1930, an additional Chinese Vice Chairman was appointed.The board of directors was responsible for all administrative affairs within the concession, including the formulation of regulations, appointment and dismissal of officials, management and disposal of public property, financial planning and taxation, and the operation of public facilities and utilities.

== Actuator ==
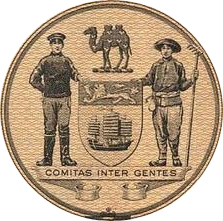
Emblem of the Ministry of Works Bureau

Following the establishment of the Board of Directors of the British Concession in Tianjin, its executive body—the Tianjin British Municipal Council—was also created. The Municipal Council was directly or indirectly subject to the authority of the British consular authorities in China and the British Foreign Office.At that time, the Municipal Council comprised several departments, including the Finance Department, Public Works Department, Police Department, Electricity Department, Waterworks Department, and the Medical and Sanitary Office.In addition, six custodial bodies were successively established within the concession under contractual arrangements with the Municipal Council. These included: the Racecourse Custodial Committee on Hongqiangdao (present-day Xinhua Road Stadium), the Bond Custodial Committee, the Vacant Land Custodial Committee, the English School Custodial Committee (now Tianjin No. 20 High School), the Tientsin Public School Custodial Committee (now Yaohua High School), and the Pension Fund Custodial Committee.Furthermore, the Municipal Council established eight municipal committees: the Electricity Committee, Medical Committee, Waterworks Committee, Public Works Committee, Confidential Finance Committee, Education Committee, Public Safety Committee, and the Volunteer Corps Committee. Members of these committees were concurrently appointed from among the Directors of the Board, with the chairman of the Board also serving as a member of each committee.

== Ministry of Works Building ==
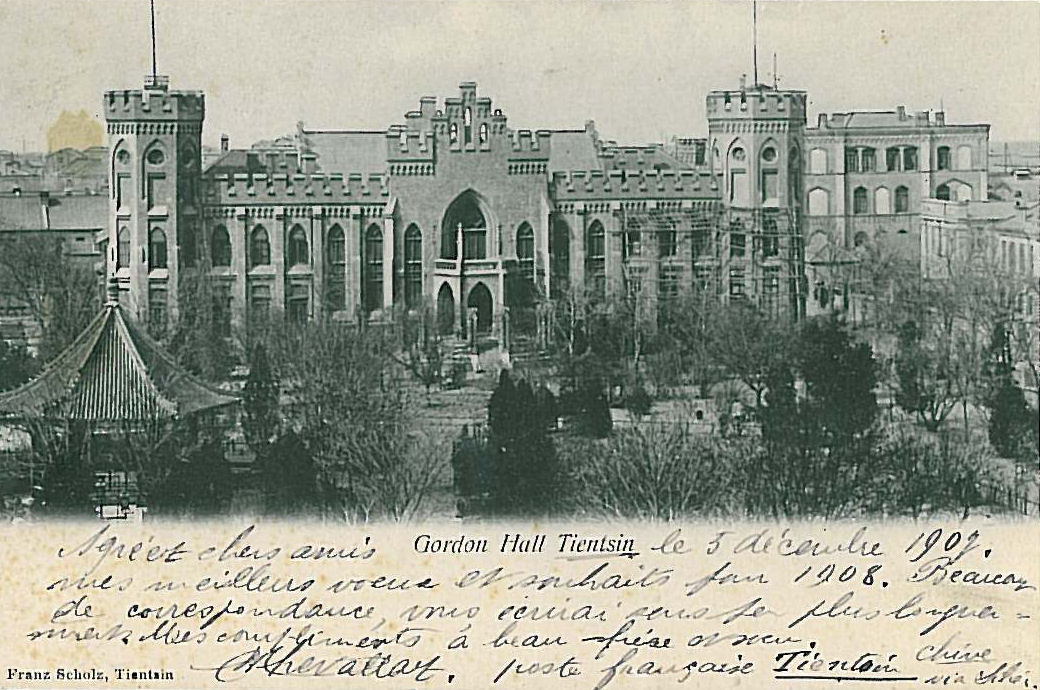
Gordon Hall on a postcard from 1907

Gordon Hall（Chinese：戈登堂）, the building of the British concession in Tianjin, was constructed in 1890. It was located on the east side of Victoria Road (Tianjin) (present-day Jiefang North Road (Tianjin) in Heping, Tianjin) and to the north of Victoria Garden (now Jiefang North Road (Tianjin)) within the British Concession. The site had originally been used as an equestrian training ground. The construction of Gordon Hall was proposed by Gustav Detring, Chairman of the Municipal Council and a British national of German origin, and designed by Chambers, with a total investment of 32,000 taels of silver. The two-story building, grand in scale, was designed in a medieval castle style, featuring blue-brick exterior walls, crenellated parapets along the roofline, and octagonal towers at both ends, providing a broad field of view. The central entrance projected outward, facilitating public access and participation. At the inauguration ceremony of Gordon Hall in 1890, prominent figures including Li Hongzhang, Governor-General of Zhili; Charles Denby, the United States Minister to China; foreign consuls in Tianjin; and Daotai Yu Changyu attended the event. A large portrait of General Gordon was displayed prominently in the hall. After praising Gordon's military achievements, Li Hongzhang formally declared the building open and presented two silver keys adorned with grey and red ribbons to Detring.On February 3, 1892, the authorities of the British Concession hosted a banquet at Gordon Hall to celebrate Li Hongzhang’s seventieth birthday. Li later funded the construction of a stage within the hall, transforming it into a well-equipped public entertainment venue in the concession, which gradually came to rival—and even replace—the Astor Theatre (Club Theatre) as a central social space for the expatriate community.In 1922, the Ratepayers’ Meeting resolved to construct a new Municipal Council building; however, the plan was eventually abandoned, and Gordon Hall continued to serve as the municipal hall of the British Concession until 1945.Following the 1976 Tangshan Earthquake, the building was damaged and subsequently demolished. A new Tianjin Municipal Government building was later constructed on the original site. For a time, only the former British concession in Tianjin Fire Brigade building behind Gordon Hall retained its original architectural appearance, but it too was demolished in 2010.

== End ==
On December 8, 1941, the day of the outbreak of the Pacific War, the Japanese army entered the British concession in Tianjin. On February 18, 1942, Japan announced the transfer of the Tianjin British Concession to the Wang Jingwei regime. On March 29, a handover ceremony was held. In 1945, after the victory of the War of Resistance Against Japan, the Chinese Nationalist Government announced the formal recovery of the Tianjin British Concession. The Tianjin British Concession Works Bureau has declared its end.

== Related works ==
- Tianjin Municipal Archives. Selected Archival Materials on Modern Tianjin Concessions. Tianjin: Tianjin People's Publishing House, 2022. ISBN 978-7-201-12142-0
- Tianjin Municipal Archives. Selected Historical Materials of the Tianjin British Municipal Council. Tianjin: Tianjin Ancient Books Publishing House, 2013. ISBN 978-7-5528-0067-8
- Tianjin Municipal Archives and Department of Archival Studies, Nankai University Branch. Selected Archival Materials on Tianjin Concessions. Tianjin: Tianjin People's Publishing House, April 1992. ISBN 978-7-201-00544-7

== See also ==
- Tianjin British Concession Electoral Conference
- Board of Directors of Tianjin British Concession Works Bureau
- British concession of Tianjin
- Tianjin French Concession Bureau of Works
