= British concession of Tianjin =

Former British enclave in China

British concession in Tianjin 天津英租界
- 1860–1945
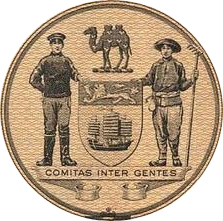
- Flag Coat of arms
- Anthem: "God Save the King/Queen"
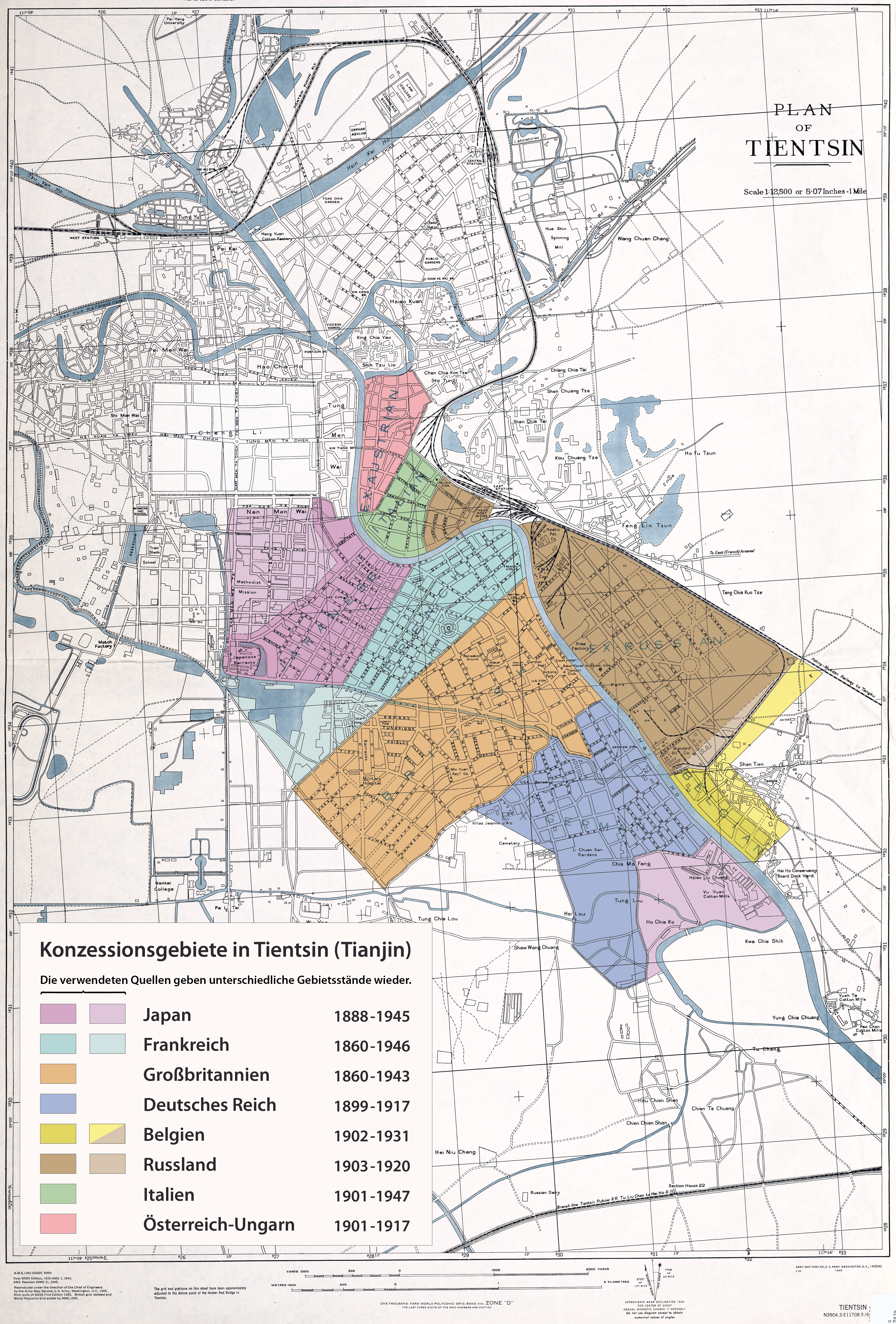
- The British concession in green Other concessions in light green British concession denoted in orange.
- Status: Concession of the United Kingdom
- History
  - Establishment following the end of the Second Opium War after the Qing Dynasty signed the Treaty of Tientsin: 1860
  - The Imperial Japanese Army invades and occupies the British concession.: 1941
  - Japan transferred jurisdiction of the concession to the Wang Jingwei regime.: 1942
  - The British decide to give formal ownership of the concession to the Republic of China. This process is completed after the Surrender of Japan at the end of the Second World War.: 1943
Preceded by	Succeeded by
Qing dynasty	Republic of China

The British concession in Tianjin (Chinese: 天津英租界) was one of seven total British concessions in China. It was one of nine foreign concessions in Tianjin, and was the earliest established and most successful out of all of the concessions. The concession bordered the French and Germans to the northwest and southeast, respectively, and faced the Russian concession across the Hai river. The settlement prospered economically, and many legacies of the British influence over Tianjin can be seen today.

== History ==
=== Establishment of the concession ===
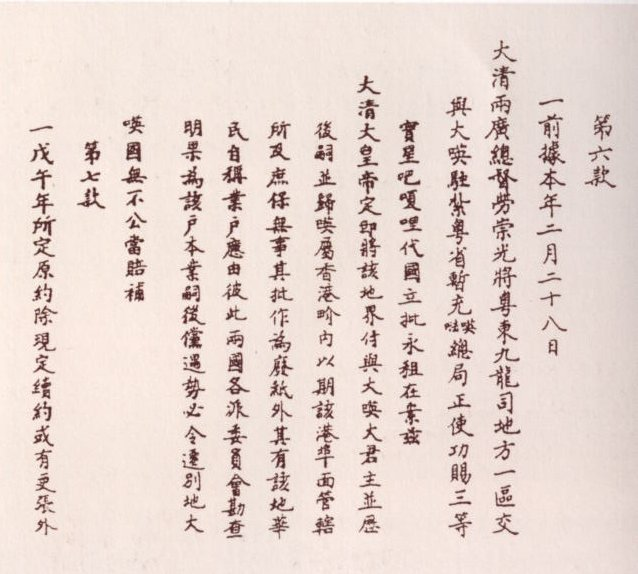
Chinese copy of the Convention of Peking

On September 11, 1860, the Qing government and Great Britain signed the Treaty of Tianjin and the Convention of Peking. On December of the same year, British diplomat Frederick Bruce forced the governor of Zhili province to demarcate the future concession in accordance with the Peking stipulations. The British concession was opened on December 17, 1860, with an initial area of about 460 mu (approximately 28.26 hectares), located on the west bank of the Hai river in former Zhizulin village 紫竹林村. Therefore, to the locals, the British concession and the surrounding German concession were also known as the "Zhizhulin concession 紫竹林租界".

=== Early history ===
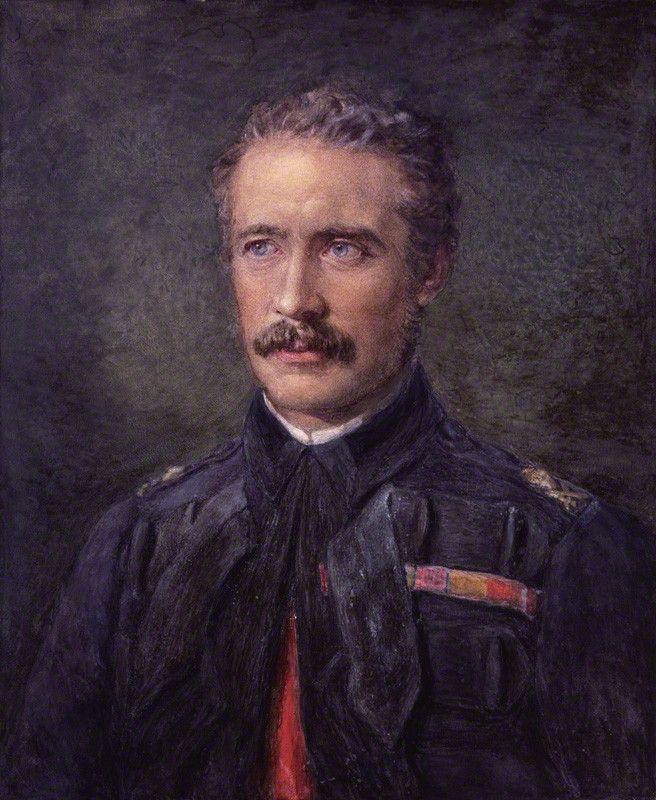
Charles George Gordon, head urban planner of the British concession in Tianjin

In order to avoid expenses such as land reclamation, most British businessmen in Tianjin avoided buying property in the concession, preferring instead to rent land in Tianjin proper. Nevertheless, due to the flourishing Sino-British trade, the concession rapidly developed; the number of British merchant ships at the concessions' newly built docks increased from 51 in 1861 to 89 in 1862. A number of foreign firms were soon built in the concession, including consulates of Britain, Prussia, Denmark, Portugal, Belgium, etc., as well as billiard rooms, basketball courts, clubs, and other entertainment facilities.

In 1870, another incident led to a sharp increase of foreign immigration into the concession: the Tianjin Massacre. Following the burning of a French church, the French consulate, and the death of consul Henri-Victor Fontainer by mob beating, many foreigners feared that living in the concessions was safer than living in direct Chinese territory and subsequently moved into the concession. In order to promote the development of trade, the British concession authorities committed to build more wharfs and port facilities.

In 1883, the municipal government of Tianjin used donations from the concession wharf to build a road from the wharf to Tianjin city, greatly facilitating the traffic between the city and the concession. As a result, the activity of Tianjin's original port center declined as the British concession became Tianjin's trade and financial center. From the early 1870s to 1894, Tianjin's foreign trade value more than quadrupled from 10 million taels to 44.27 million taels, boosting Tianjin's commercial activity to one of the most valuable in the country, and Britain's Tianjin concession became more prosperous than all other British concessions at the time. By this time, the British concession also quickly outshone the other concessions as well. The French defeat in the Franco-Prussian war and expenses from the wars waged in Vietnam and China meant French trade relations ground to an almost complete halt. Thus, the French concession, the only concession capable of competing with the British concession, lost its shine.

=== Expansions ===
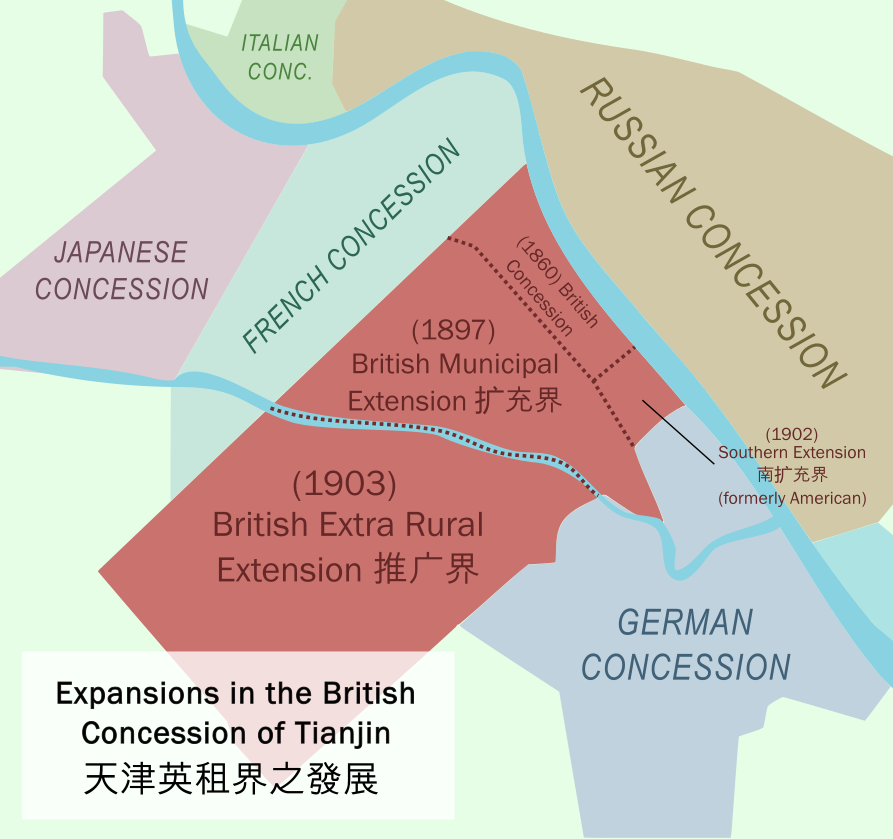
Changes in the British concession in Tianjin

On March 31, 1897, with negotiations with the Qing government, the British extended their concession westward to the Qiangzi River, and acquired 1630 acres of land known as the British Municipal Extension. On October 23, 1902, the de facto American concession of Tianjin merged with the British concession, and the Southern Extension of 131 acres was added. The concession expanded yet again, this time west of the Qiangzi River, and acquired an additional 3928 acres of land in the British Extra Rural Extension.

In June 1923, Li Yuanhong announced that the government of the Republic of China would be moved to Tianjin, which was actually the British concession in Tianjin, and issued presidential directives and presidential appointments there, and set up a guest house for members. This once made the British concession in Tianjin the residence of the President of the Republic of China.

=== British-Japanese Dispute and the Concession Crisis ===
Following the Second Sino-Japanese War, Japan had extreme grudges with Britain's condemnation of Japan's actions and sending of aid to China. At the same time, Japan's own aggressive expansions in its concession led to conflicts between the Japanese and British; the existence of the international concession had led to major obstacles in Japan's pursuit of a "Greater East Asia Co-Prosperity Sphere". The British concession looked especially favorable for invasion: it held considerable amounts of Chinese governmental silver reserves, and at the same time was prone to anti-Japanese activity carried out by the nascent Kuomintang. In 1939, at the eve of World War II, the Japanese army breached international contracts by invading both the British concession on Tianjin and Gulangyu International Settlement simultaneously.

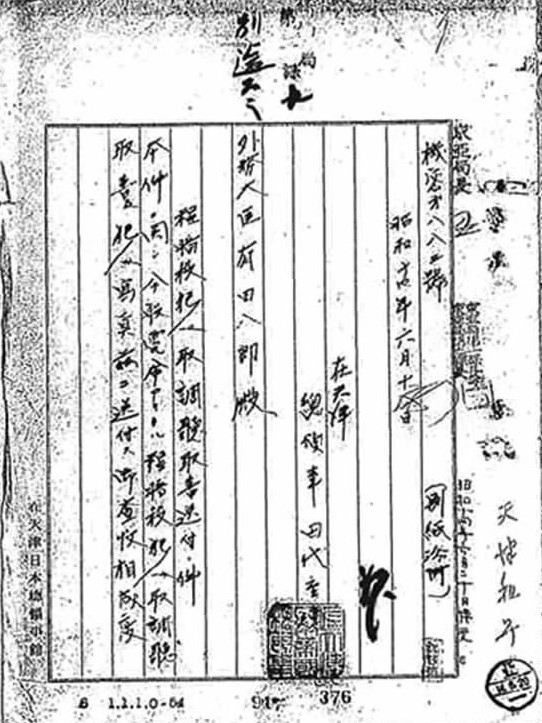
Diplomatic Letter on the Cheng Xigeng Incident

Disputes between Britain and Japan had been growing as early as 1938. At the end of September, the British concession authorities arrested Su Qingwu, a supposed leader of the anti-Japanese guerrillas, on the advice of the Japanese military authorities. The Japanese side requested the British concession authorities to extradite Qingwu, but the British side refuted that there was insufficient evidence to prove that Qingwu used the concession as a base for anti-Japanese activities. The stalemate in Qingwu's case led to heated debates in the British government; both the British ambassador and consul in Tianjin believed if Qingwu was guilty, he ought to be transferred to Japan. However, the British ambassador to China and most members of the British Foreign Office, Far East Department disagreed, believing that "Japanese actions during the Tianjin incident is part of its 'new order' policy meant to completely squeeze out British influence in China". The British Foreign Office took the stance of the latter and declined to hand over Qingwu to the Japanese.

Another incident arose during the Japanese-British dispute over Qingwu. On April 9, 1939, famed pro-Japanese activist Cheng Xigeng was assassinated in the Grand Cinema, Shanghai, by a sniper. Xigeng had been a Tianjin customs supervisor and manager of the Tianjin Branch of China United Preparatory Bank at the time of his death. Four suspects were arrested in the British concession linked to Xigeng's assassination, and consequently, the Japanese authorities requested that the four people be handed over to Japan. Once again, the British side debated whether to hand the four suspects over. Japan, exasperated, issued an ultimatum on June 5 to the British Tianjin authorities that if the suspects weren't handed over within two days, Japan will blockade the concession. Britain offered to form an investigative committee between Britain, Japan, and the United States, but this proposal was staunchly refused by Japan. On June 14, Japan formally blockaded the British Concession, causing a halt to normal life in the concession.

The provocative actions made by Japan led to a strong reaction from British residents in the concession. The Japanese army undressed and checked the British people entering and leaving the British concession regardless of gender, which caused an uproar in British public opinion. British Prime Minister Chamberlain hinted in the House of Commons that unless Japan lifted the blockade, the United Kingdom might resort to economic retaliation. On the 15th, the British Chambers of Commerce submitted several proposals to the Foreign Office on economic sanctions against Japan, the most important of which was the abolition of the 1911 Anglo-Japanese Treaty. On the 17th, British officials announced that if the situation in Tianjin had not improved by the end of the week, the UK would deploy three economic retaliatory methods:

1. Cancel Japan's "most favored nation" treatment economically;
2. Abolish the Anglo-Japanese Treaty;
3. Impose heavy taxes on Japanese imported goods.

However, with the outbreak of war in Europe the situation became increasingly unfavorable to Britain. On June 22, 1940, France surrendered to Nazi Germany. Britain fell into a lonely battle in Europe. Under the leadership of the new Prime Minister Winston Churchill, Britain switched its approach and became more committed to compromise with Japan and resolve the Tianjin crisis as soon as possible. In the end, regardless of China's opposition, Britain formally signed the Tianjin Agreement with Japan on June 12, 1940, and compromised with Japan on the issue of Tianjin bank deposits. Four suspects were turned over to Japanese authorities, all of whom were executed. The Japanese army lifted the 372-day blockade of the British Concession in Tianjin, and the crisis in the Tianjin Concession was thus alleviated.

=== Withdrawal ===
On December 8, 1941, at the breakout of the Pacific War, Japanese troops once again invaded and became stationed in the British concession; this time, there were no agreements to be made. On February 18, 1942, Japan announced the transfer of the Tianjin British Concession to the Wang Jingwei regime, a Chinese puppet government, and a handover ceremony was held on March 29. After the Japanese surrender to the Allied powers in 1945, the Chinese Nationalists announced the formal absorption of the British concession.

== Politics ==
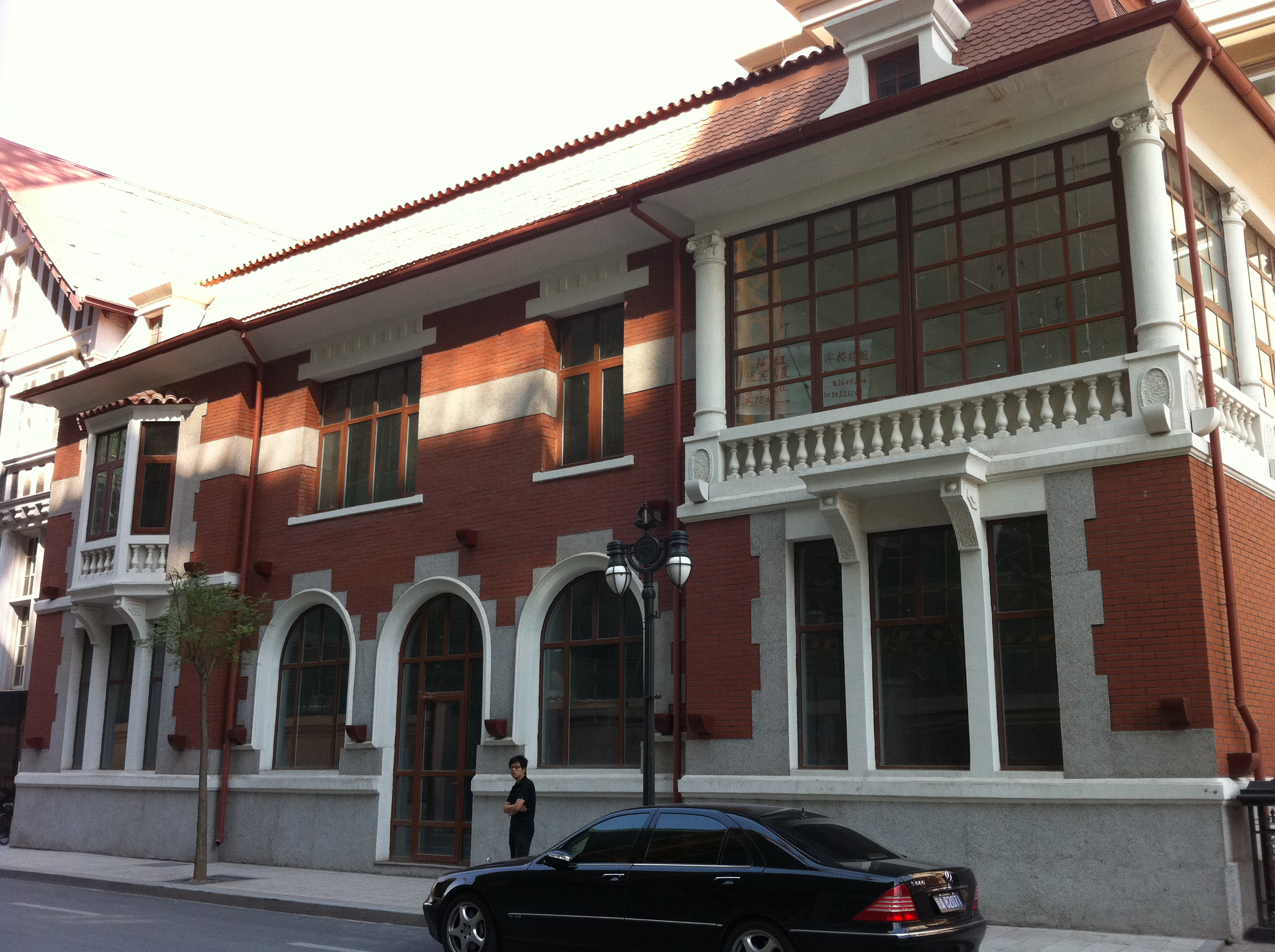
Former Tianjin British consulate

Britain mimicked its own political system and designed the political system of the British concession in Tianjin, making the British concession the concession with the highest degree of diaspora autonomy. The British consul in Tianjin did not serve as the director-general of the board of directors of the Tianjin British Municipal Council, and under normal circumstances did not interfere with the daily administrative affairs of the Tianjin British Municipal Council. Regarding the resolutions made by the concession taxpayers’ meeting to reform the status quo of the concessions, the British consulates could only veto them within a few days after the resolution is made, and had no right to overturn them afterwards. At the same time, the concession police in the British concession were not under the command of the consulate, but one of the few concessions directly controlled by the Tianjin British Municipal Council. Because of this, the British concession was called a concession "autonomous" by the diaspora.

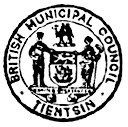
Emblem of the Tianjin British Municipal Council

=== Tianjin British Municipal Council ===
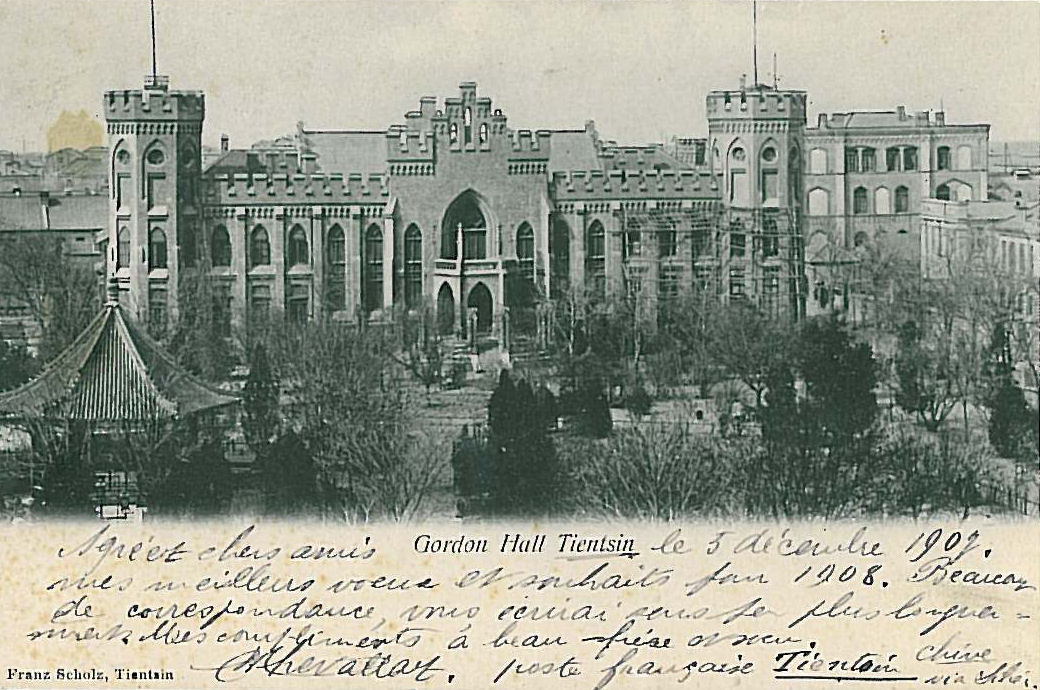
Postcard of Gordon Hall, Tienstin, circa 1907

Established in 1862, the Tianjin British Municipal Council in the British Concession was the highest administrative agency in British Tianjin. Gordon Hall, built in 1890, became its headquarters. It was indirectly under the leadership of the British Ambassador and the Foreign Office. The Bureau had multiple custody groups, branch offices, and municipal committees that governed various aspects of life within the British concession.

=== Tianjin British Board of Directors ===
The directors of the Tianjin British Concession were the governing bodies and decision-making organs. The directors were elected by taxpayers in the concession for a term of one year. All directors were re-elected upon expiry.

Before 1899, the board of directors of the concession consisted of five directors, all of whom were British nationals. Later, the number of directors increased to nine. When the American concession was merged into the British concession in 1902, the British and American parties stipulated that at least five members of the board of directors were to be British and one was to be American.

Later, the "Articles of 1918 of the Tianjin British Municipal Council" stipulated that the number of directors of the board of directors of the British Concession in Tianjin must be more than five, of which at least five were to be British.

In 1926, the board of directors of the Tianjin British Concession had two Chinese directors.

In 1927, the number of Chinese and Chinese directors on the board of directors of the Tianjin British Concession increased to three.

After 1930, a Chinese vice chairman was added.

The board of directors of the Tianjin-British Concession was responsible for all necessary affairs in the Tianjin-British Concession, such as: concession regulations, appointment and removal of officials, buying and selling of public property, raising finances, taxation, and operating public equipment and public utilities.

=== Former British barracks ===
The former British barracks in Tianjin was built in 1900. When it was first established, the barracks occupied an area of 124 acres and a building area of 23,500 square meters. The initial garrison of the barracks was 1,400 men. In 1902, when the Eight Nation Alliance ended their occupation of Tianjin, 806 troops were stationed. By the 1930s, the number of troops stationed in the barracks grew to more than 3,000. In 1937, the former British barracks in Tianjin was occupied by the Japanese army. After Japan surrendered in 1945, the barracks was again stationed by the US military. In 1947, the Tianjin Municipal Middle School was established on the former site.

== Economy ==
The infrastructure initiated by the concession solved the basic problems of urban production and life such as centralized water supply and power supply, roads and bridges, public transportation, commercial and residential buildings, and provided a suitable investment environment for both Chinese and foreign capital. As a result, the economy of the British concession was exceedingly prosperous, with the economic nucleus of Tianjin shifting to the concession; by 1937, 404 of the 483 foreign firms were concentrated in the concession.

The British concession in Tianjin flourished for many reasons. For one, the United Kingdom was the strongest national power that invested into the economy of the concession. Its trade with China accounted for most of the trade between China and foreign countries; therefore, the British businessmen in China were already financially independent and had the funds to invest into the concession. Additionally, like most other British concessions, the British concession in Tianjin was the first of the nine countries that would come to own a parcel of Tianjin. Thus, most of Tianjin's foreign economic policies were molded heavily by the concession's interests.

=== Industry ===
In the early days of its establishment, the British concession in Tianjin opened factories that were wholly foreign-owned and did not have the nature of independent industrial enterprises. Some were machinery packaging services, while others were water and power supply companies that served both the concession and Tianjin. As the concession developed, companies diversified. In the food industry, Tianjin Wanguo Soda Co., Ltd., Watsons Pharmacy Ice Factory, Xinle Ice Factory, North China Drinking Water Company, Miqos Company, and the United States Dairy factories engaged in business in the concession. Cigarette companies like the British-American Tobacco Company monopolized the tobacco industry in north China. In the textile industry, as many as nine companies like the Siemens Electric Company, Dongfang Machinery Factory, and Jieling Motor Company were established.

Chinese-owned industries in the concession appeared in the late 1870s, mostly built and funded by Chinese bureaucrats who were inspired by the Self-Strengthening Movement, including flour making, machine repair, weaving, carpetmaking, wool spinning, etc. The larger Chinese-established companies were Wanshun Iron Factory (万顺铁工厂), Beiyang Velvet Factory (北洋织绒厂), Renli Wool Spinning Factory (仁立毛纺厂), Dongya Woolen Textile Co., Ltd. (东亚毛呢纺织股份有限公司), etc.

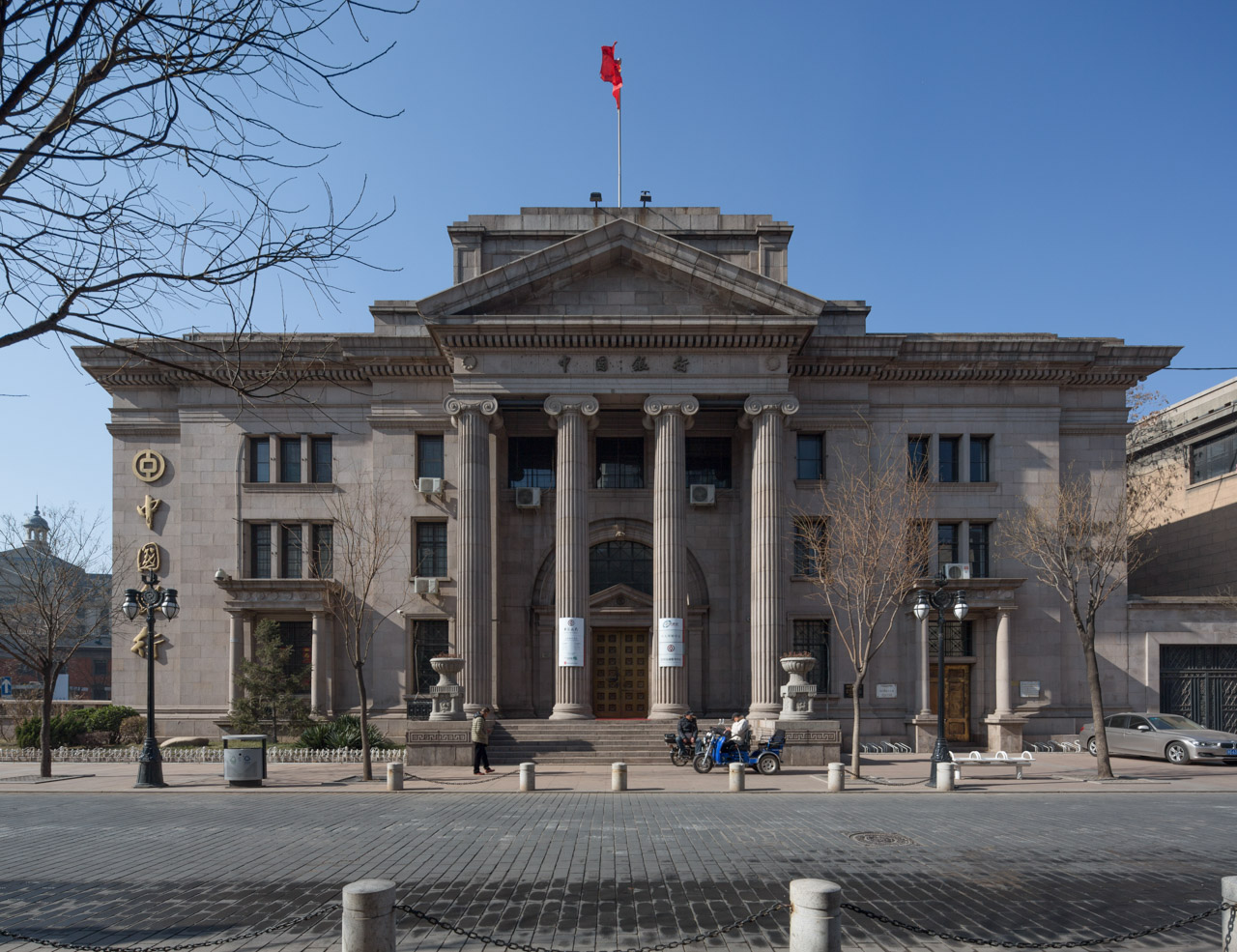
The HSBC bank in Tianjin, built in 1925

=== Finance ===
The British concession had one of the highest concentrated banking industries of its time with both foreign and Chinese-operated companies. The first bank to be established in the concession was the HSBC Bank in 1882. From there, various other firms like Standard Chartered, Russo-Chinese Bank, Deutsch-Asiatische Bank, Citibank, Yokohama Specie Bank, Generale Belgian Bank, and more had set up branches in the concession.

=== Business ===
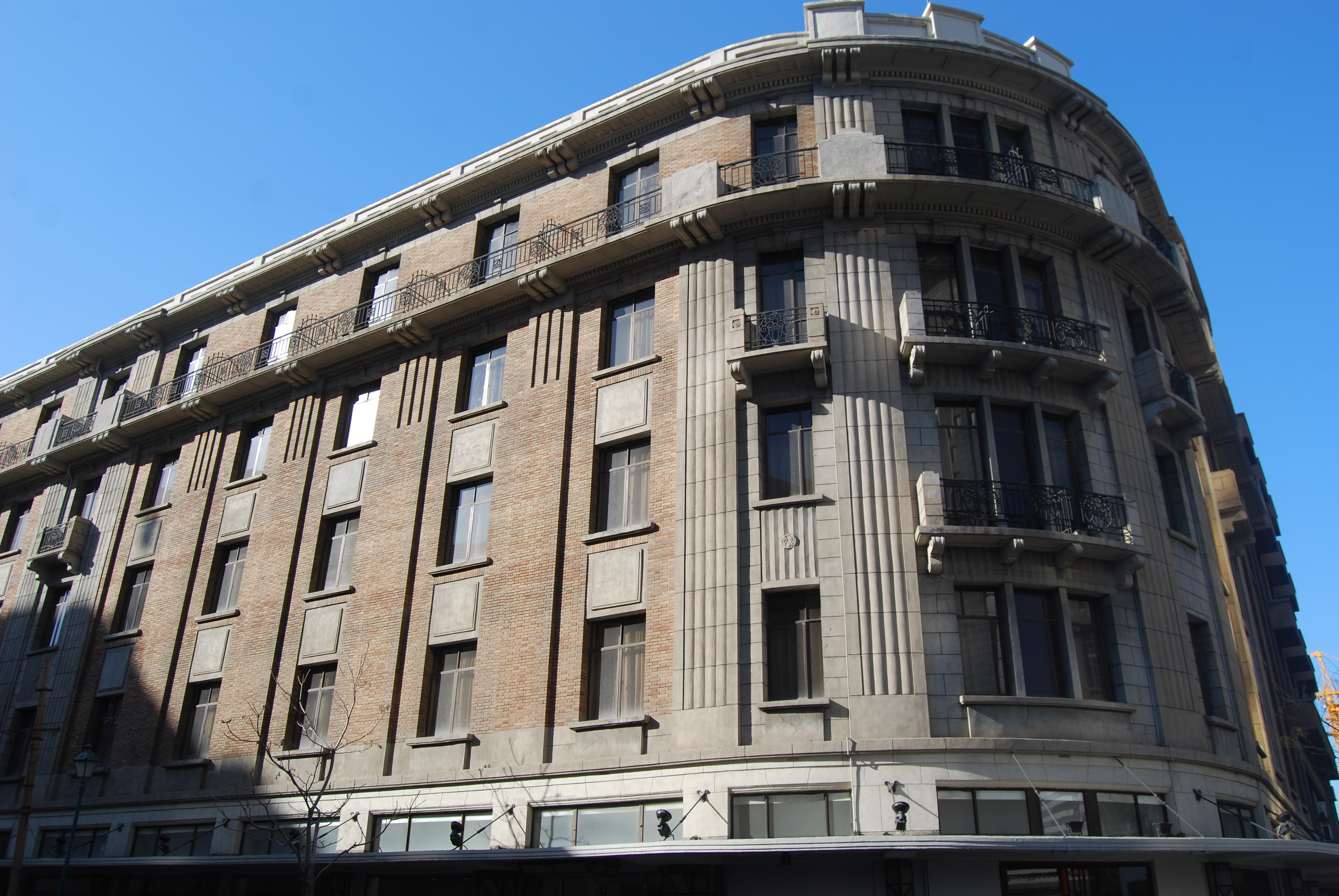
The Taylor hotel, built in 1933. It is now the No. 1 ranked hotel in Tianjin.

Most of the earliest foreign banks established in Tianjin were operated by British businessmen, located in the British concession. Later, with the development of import and export trade and the continuous improvement of the environment in the British Concession in Tianjin, the number of foreign firms increased year by year. In 1936, Britain had 68 foreign banks of various types in Tianjin. The British merchants in the British concession had a wide range of operations, ranging from opium to various machines and munitions. Therefore, the merchants had been in a dominant position in import and export trade for a long time. Among them, the two foreign firms, Jardine and Taikoo of the British merchants, monopolized the shipping business in Tianjin and set up special docks and warehouses in the dam of the concession. At that time, the well-known foreign firms in the British Concession in Tianjin were: Gaolin International, Jardine International Holdings Tianjin Branch, Taikoo International Holdings Tianjin Branch, Xintaixing International Holdings, Renji International Holdings Ya Tianjin Branch, Amway International Holdings, etc.

There were two major commercial areas in the British concession: Xiaobailou (formerly the American concession) in the east and Huangjia garden in the middle. The Xiaobailou commercial area was home to bars, dance halls, Western-style restaurants, clothing shops, beauty shops, and more. Hotels and catering services were also concentrated in the British concession as well. Among the more famous were the Astor Hotel, Palace Hotel, Taylor, English Country Club, etc.

=== Real Estate ===
The most concentrated investment project in the concession was the real estate industry, represented by high-end residential buildings. From the 1920s to the early 1930s, with the gradual improvement of the concession infrastructure, and at the same time, in order to avoid the war and seek asylum, Chinese businessmen, entrepreneurs, politicians, etc. rushed to buy land and build houses in the concessions and buy properties. This upsurge caused the land price in the concession to rise from 300 taels per mu to 3,000 taels between 1913 and 1923. The promotion sector in the concession became a high-end residential area, attracting all sorts of celebrities and important figures.

== Life in the concession ==
=== Education ===
Under the influence and participation of the missionaries and the Chinese in the concessions, modern education in the concession flourished. As the British concession was the most prosperous concession in Tianjin, its achievements in education were a microcosm of Tianjin's modern education. In 1911, Wang Yun founded the Tianjin Private Jingcun Girls' School (竞存女子学校) in the British concession, which was the first girls' primary school in Tianjin. In 1927, under the advocacy of Zhuang Lefeng, director of the British Tianjin Chinese Taxation Association, the city used 18% of the Chinese tax payment to establish Tianjin Yaohua High School (天津市耀华中学) in the concession and hired Beiyang University Supervisor Wang Longguang as the principal.

In the following year, due to the increasing number of students, Zhuang Lefeng submitted a request for land expansion to the Tianjin British Municipal Council. He found a new school site for the expansion of a 53-acre depression on the bank of the wall, and hired a British architect to design and build a Chinese-Western building. The school with complete facilities was later moved to the current site on the bank of the wall. In addition, there were English grammar schools, such as the Tianjin No. 20 High School (天津市第二十中学) in the British concession.

=== Media ===
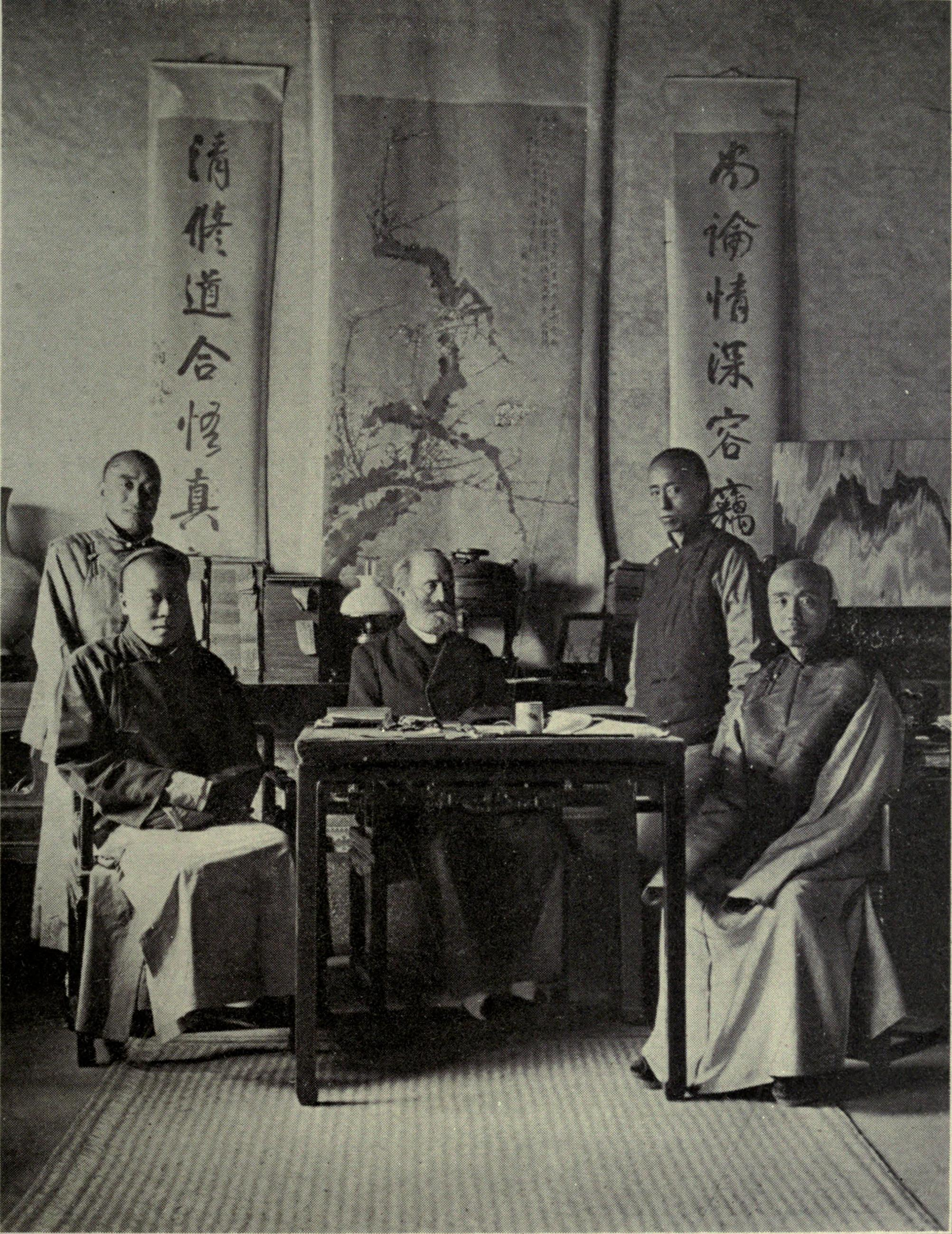
William Alexander Parsons Martin, writer for the China Times (Tianjin), with faculty of the Chinese Imperial University.

While the missionaries and Chinese in the concessions promoted education, newspapers and magazines founded by foreigners had also emerged, most of which were located in the British and French concessions. On November 6, 1886, the British-German Gustav Detring founded Tianjin's first newspaper, the China Times, in the British concession in Tianjin. This newspaper was originally an English weekly, and its contributors were mostly missionaries proficient in Chinese culture. The most distinctive feature was that it specialized in translating and publishing Chinese news, Shangyu, and "any other Chinese newspapers." The newspaper was called "the best newspaper in the Far East" at the time. In March 1894, the British architect William Bellingham founded the Peking and Tientsin Times with the support of the Tianjin British Municipal Council. It was suspended until the outbreak of the Pacific War in 1941.

By the 1930s, foreigners had established more than 40 kinds of newspapers in Tianjin, most of which were run in the British and French concessions and had missionary backgrounds. While spreading the news, these newspapers and magazines also played a role in educating the Tianjin populace. From the end of the 19th century to the beginning of the 20th century, as all social strata gradually realized the importance of enlightenment, a large number of newspaper reading offices appeared for citizens to read newspapers, magazines, and books for free. By the early 1930s, there were nearly 30 Chinese and foreign news agencies in Tianjin, distributing more than 30 types of newspapers, with a total circulation of more than 290,000 copies and a local distribution of 187,000 copies. Numerous tabloids were produced as well.

=== Sports ===
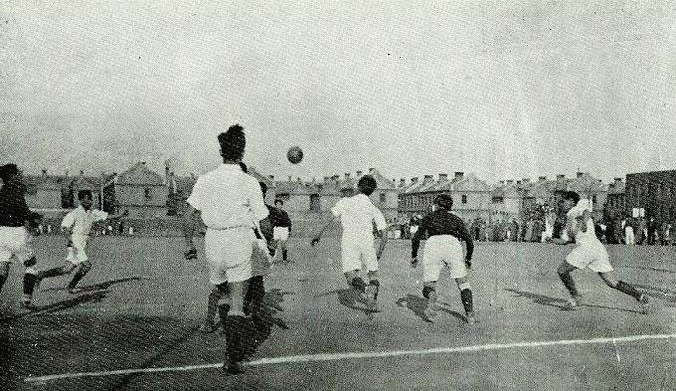
A soccer match in the British concession, 1938

After the establishment of the Tianjin Concession, with the continuous arrival of British expatriates, various modern sports activities were first widely carried out in the concession. Various sports clubs were established in Tianjin. The earliest public stadium in Tianjin was constructed. In the early 20th century, the concession became the center of modern sports in Tianjin.

In 1862, the Tianjin Jockey Club was established and held the horse racing tournament in Tianjin. The Tianjin Jockey Club also became the earliest sports club in the British concession in Tianjin. In terms of sports venues, a public stadium commonly known as the "British Stadium" was established in the concession in January 1895 via fund-raising. In 1926, the Minyuan Stadium was completed and a number of large-scale events were held.

== Municipal construction ==
=== Roads ===
In 1870, the first road was built in the concession, from the Old Customs Building to the Middle Street (now Jiefang North Road) from the Lishunde Hotel. This was also the first road built in any of the Tianjin concessions. In 1887, in front of the residence of the chairman of the British concession, Gustav von Detring, the Tianjin British Municipal Council used gravel to pave a road, which became the first gravel road in Tianjin. Since then, roads such as Race Course Road and Hai Avenue (now Dagu Road) had been created, though they were all simple dirt roads or gravel roads.

The Tianjin-British Concession was initially small in scale; there were only three north–south roads, namely, Victoria Road in the middle, Heba Road on the east side, and Haida Road on the west side. Although there were six or seven east–west roads, they were all extremely short. Among them, Jardine Road and Baoshun Road were named after foreign companies. After the expansion of the concession at the end of the 19th century, more than 70 streets were built one after another. Many of these roads were named after British mainland or territorial cities, such as Singapore Road, Cambridge Road, Edinburgh Road, London Road, Dublin Road, etc.

=== Public gardens ===
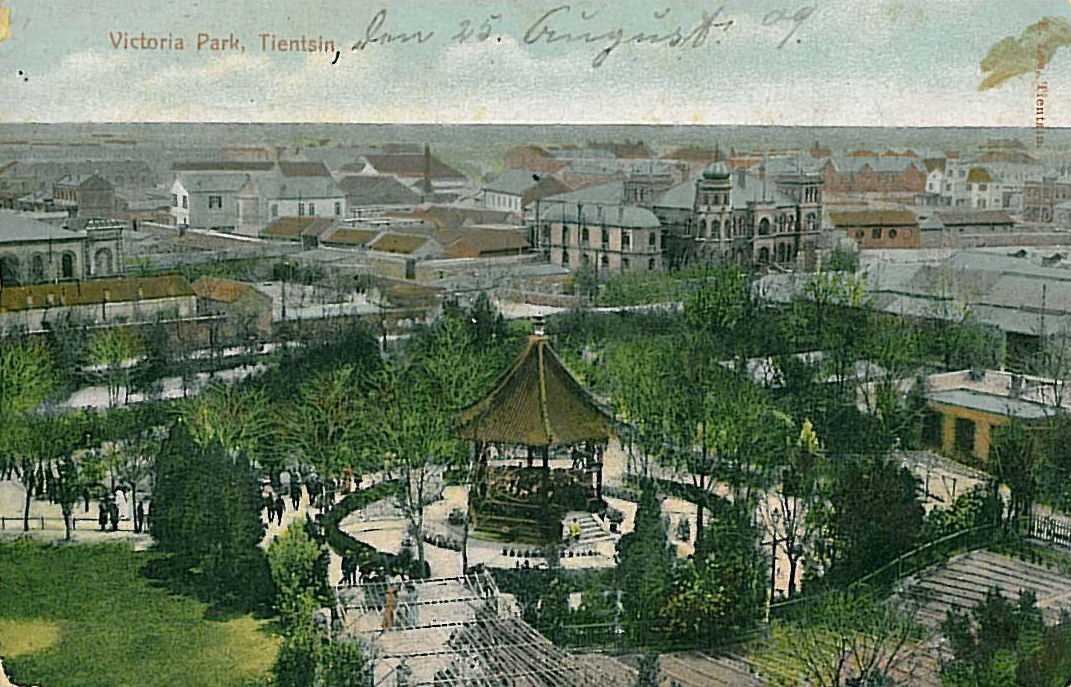
Victoria Park in Tientsin, 1909

In conjunction with the Haihe River dredging project, the Tianjin British Municipal Council, Engineering Bureau reclaimed part of the dredged area into urban parks, such as the Victoria Park, the earliest landscaped park in the British Concession in Tianjin. On June 21, 1887, on the 50th anniversary of Queen Victoria's accession to the throne, the park was officially opened, called "Victoria Park", covering an area of 18.5 acres. The entire plan of the park adopted the regular layout of Western traditional gardens. Its plants configuration, layout building, and garden management were all advanced at the time, and it had a profound influence on the construction of Tianjin's later generations of gardens. In addition, there were also the Queen's Garden (皇后花园), Jiubli Park (久布利公园), and Yilu Golden Garden (义路金花园) in the concession.

=== Water supply ===
Built at the intersection of Baoding and Jianshe Road, the first water plant in the British concession was constructed in 1898 by Gibb, Livingston & Co. It was the third water plant built in China. As the concession continued to expand, the Tianjin British Municipal Council purchased the water plant in January 1923 and renamed it as the "Tianjin British Municipal Council, Waterway Division". Due to serious water pollution of the Haihe River at that time, in 1925, while expanding the water plant, theTianjin British Municipal Council began attempts to produce water from wells which improved the quality of the water. As of February 1941, the subordinate water plants included the Bacchus Road plant, the Dakra Road plant, the Queen's Garden plant, and the Heba Water Inlet plant. The total production capacity of the four plants was 1,363 cubic meters of river water and 11,818 cubic meters of well water. During the management period, a total of 5.57 kilometers of water supply pipelines were laid. The total area of the British Concession was 3.7 square kilometers, so with 14.58 kilometers of water supply pipelines per square kilometer, the penetration rate was almost 100%.

=== Power supply ===
The British concession had been able to supply electricity since 1906. The concession authorities commissioned Gibb, Livingston & Co. to raise 250,000 yuan to build a small power plant in the Huangjia Garden area. In 1923, two 1,000-kilowatt steam turbine generators were installed and changed to AC power supply. When the power plant was first opened, the total load of the actual connected users was about 1,000 kilowatts. By 1936, the total power generation capacity of the plant had increased to 7,000 kilowatts.

== Society ==
=== Population ===
Prior to the opening of the concession, the site was very sparsely populated with only scattered Chinese households of no more than 20 people. During the establishment of the concession, population growth was initially slow. In 1867, 112 foreigners lived in the city. By 1906, the population had jumped to 1970. By 1938, foreign residents numbered 4728, and the total population was marked at 76,815. By the outbreak of the Pacific War, however, no British or American nationals were living in the concession for fear of being sent to the Weixian Internment Camp.

Notable people who had lived in the concession included Eric Liddell, Herbert Hoover, Wellington Koo, Sun Chuanfang, Cao Kun, Yan Huiqing, and more.

=== Religion ===
There were multiple religious sites serving foreign nationals, including but not limited to, the All Saints' Church, Union Church, and Tianjin Synagogue. In 1937, the Methodist church began construction of the Holy Way church, though it was only completed after the concession was handed over to the Chinese following the war.

In terms of church organization, since the opening of the concession, the Church of England decided to establish the English Church of Tianjin, directly under the leadership of the Overseas Missionary Society of the United Kingdom and the Bishop of the North China Diocese of the Anglican Church. Among them, before the Boxer Movement, the Anglican Church sent missionaries to Tianjin to plan the establishment of the church and received the support from the Tianjin British Municipal Council.

=== Law and Order ===
Due to the efforts of concession officials, the concession maintained a good social atmosphere by prohibiting the activities of any opium dens, casinos, and brothels in its territory. One of the most notable policies of the concession when expanding was to ban brothels, gambling halls, and other institutions that were "inconsistent with ethics". Compared to the Japanese concession, as there were no such institutes, there was generally lower triad activity, lower crime rates, and higher social security.

=== Health ===
After the establishment of the concession, a number of hospitals were successively established to ensure medical treatment for foreigners in the concession. Some hospitals in the concession were built by missionaries. As the settlement rapidly increased in size, Chinese doctors also established hospitals and clinics in the concession. The establishment of these modern hospitals, to a certain extent, helped contribute to the modern medicine infrastructure in Tianjin today.

The British concession had strict regulations regarding environmental sanitation and garbage disposal, prohibiting the dumping of waste or dirty soil in the streets. All households in the concession had to dump garbage in their own houses. In accordance with stipulations from the Tianjin British Municipal Council, all residents must have had a tested and well-performing septic tank and sewage pipes. Later, concession authorities decided to stop using fecal trucks, and the householders and lot owners had to build new sanitary toilet equipment for septic tanks in accordance with the new regulations.

== Current status ==
The area where the former British concession in Tianjin is located is still the core area of downtown Tianjin. Most of the buildings have been preserved, and some of them have maintained their original appearance. Currently, the Tai'an Road, Five Avenues, and Jiefang North Road areas that belonged to the British Concession have been included in the list as the Tianjin historical and cultural district. Starting from March 2010, Tianjin repaired and constructed supporting buildings on the historic districts of Tai'an Road and surrounding areas in the former British concession in Tianjin with Jiefang North Road as the core, with the project being completed in 2011.

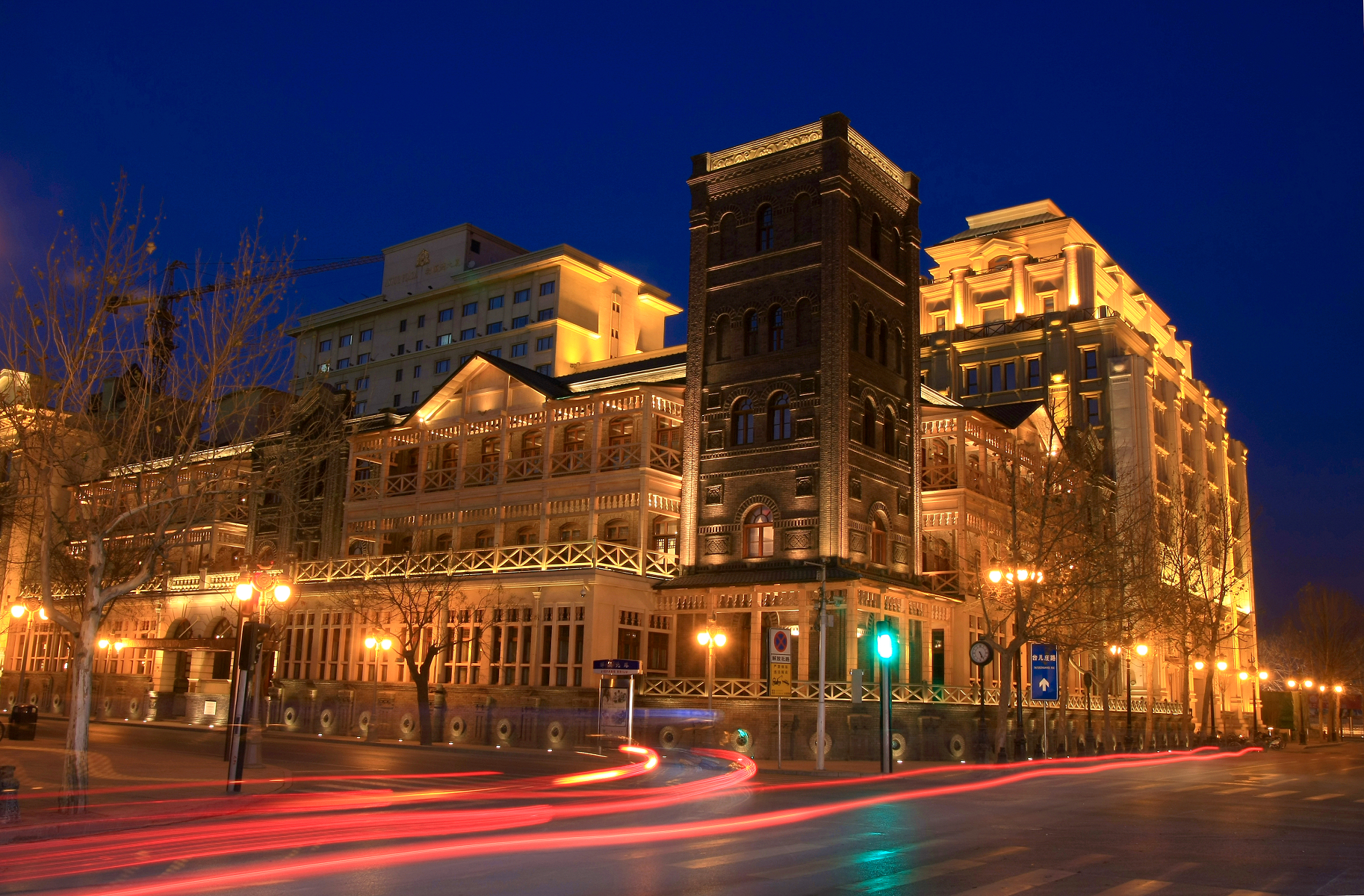
Night view of the Astor hotel

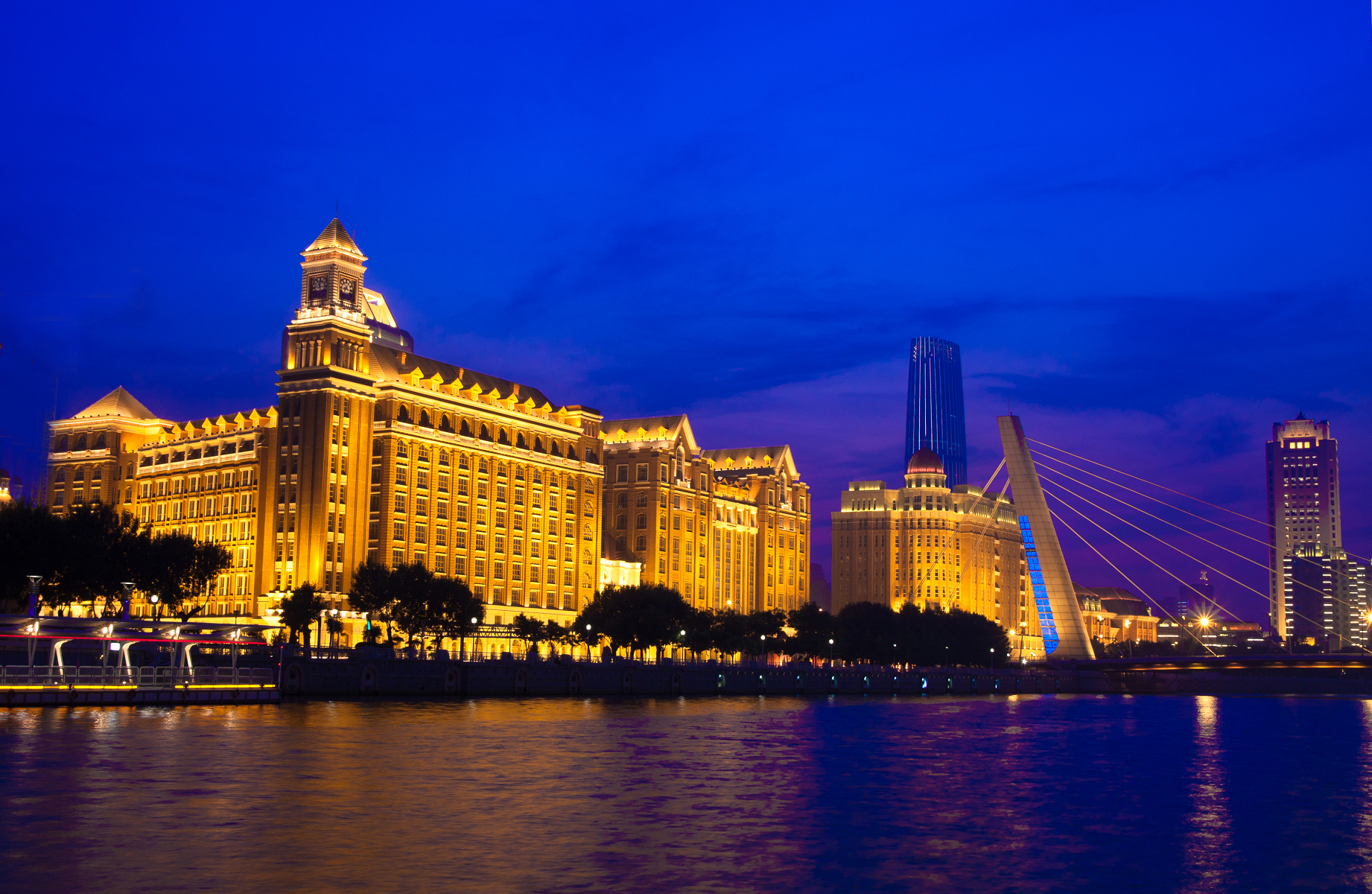
Haihe River along Tai'an Road

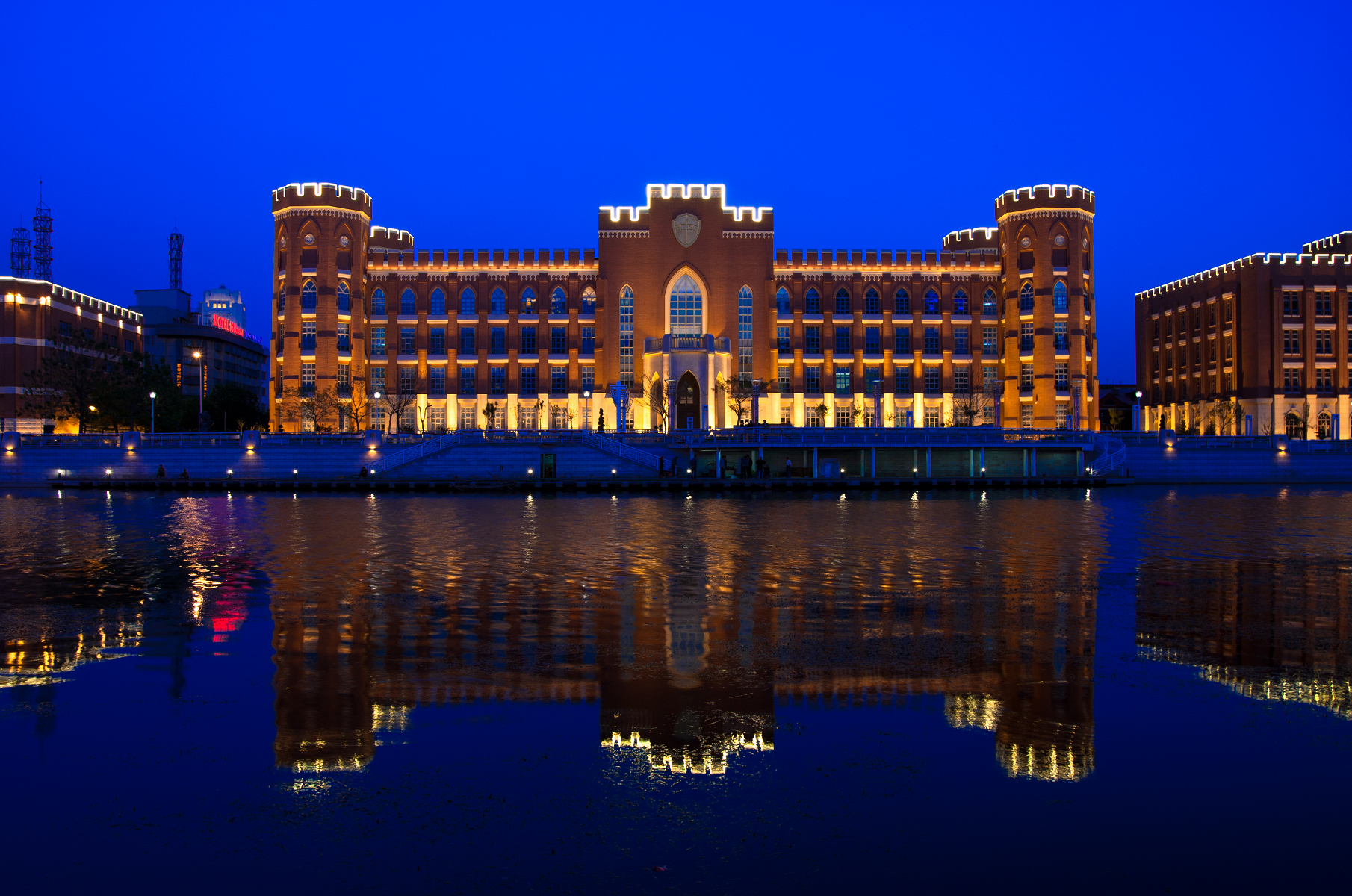
Site of the Gordon Hall

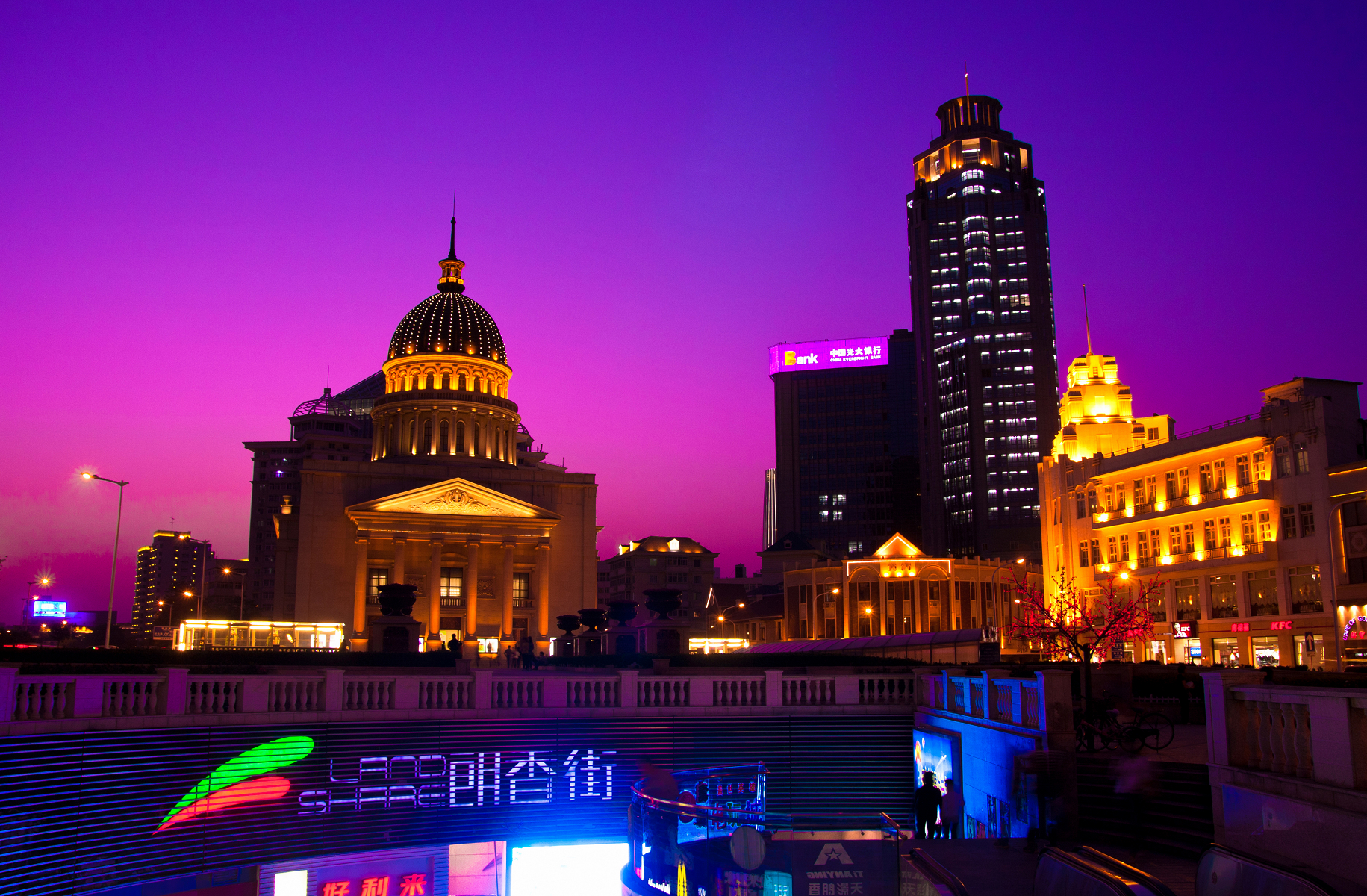
Settlement-era buildings in Xiaobailou district

== Gallery ==
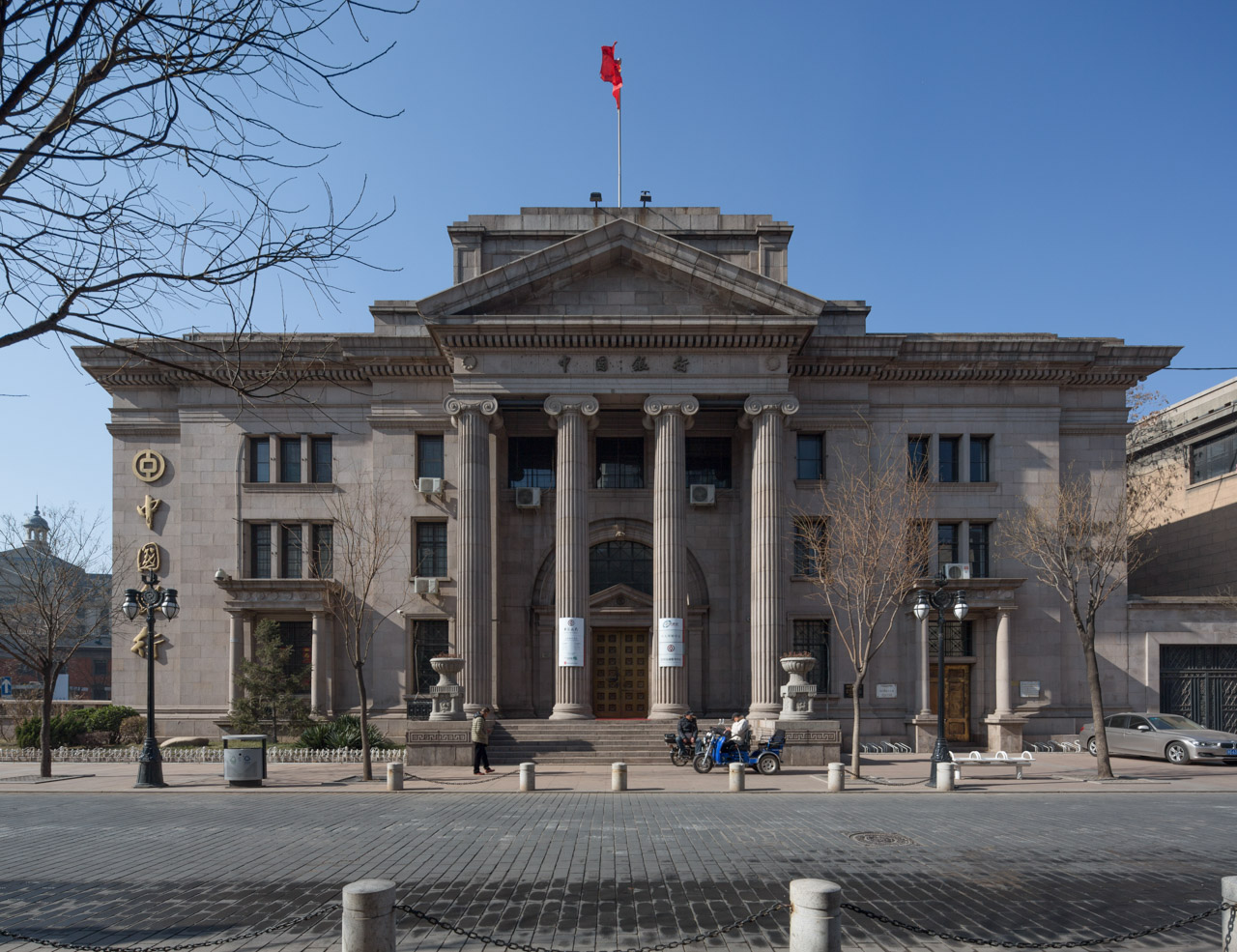
The HSBC Building on Victoria Road, built in 1925

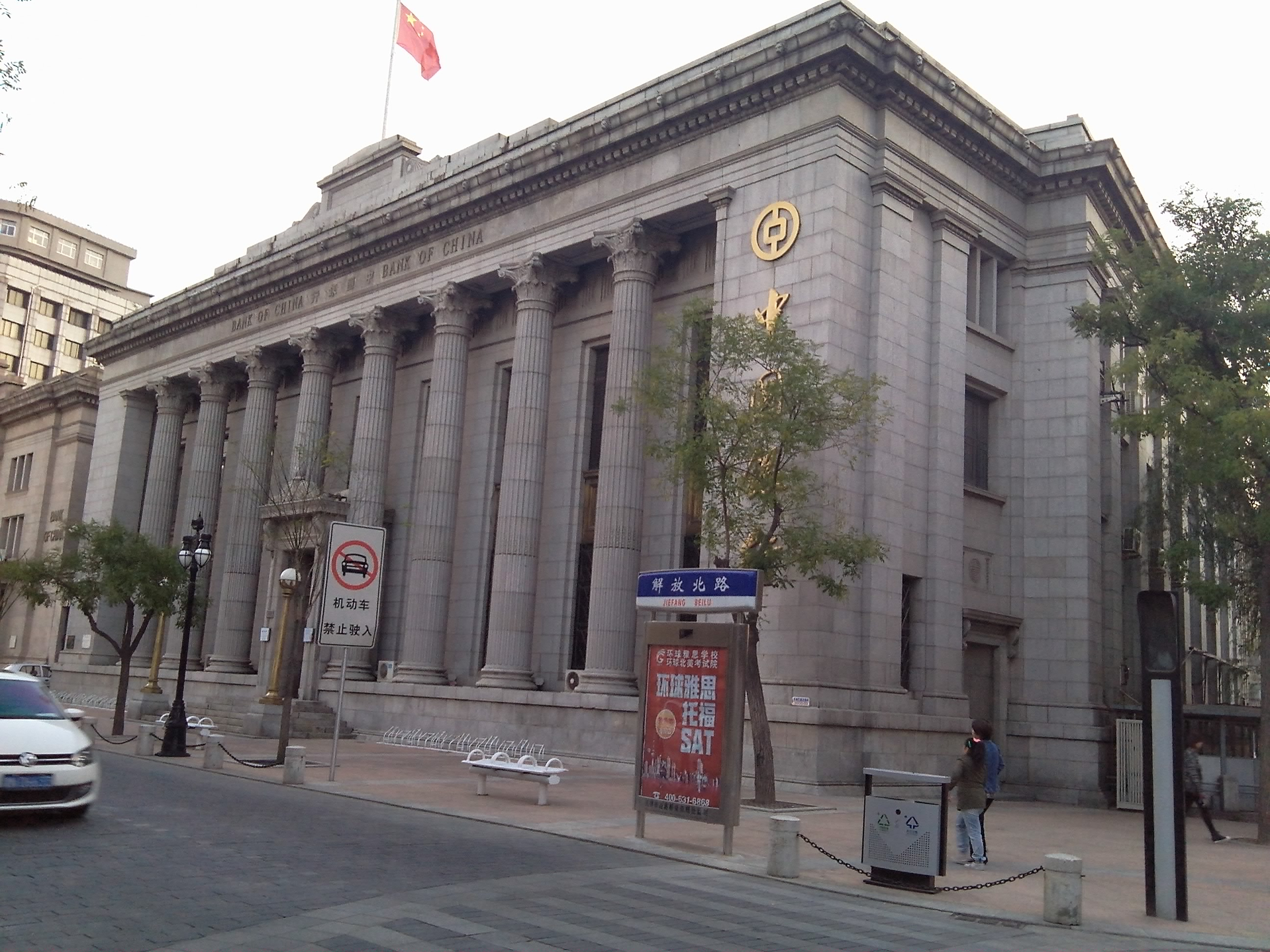
The Yokohama Specie House on Victoria Road, built in 1926

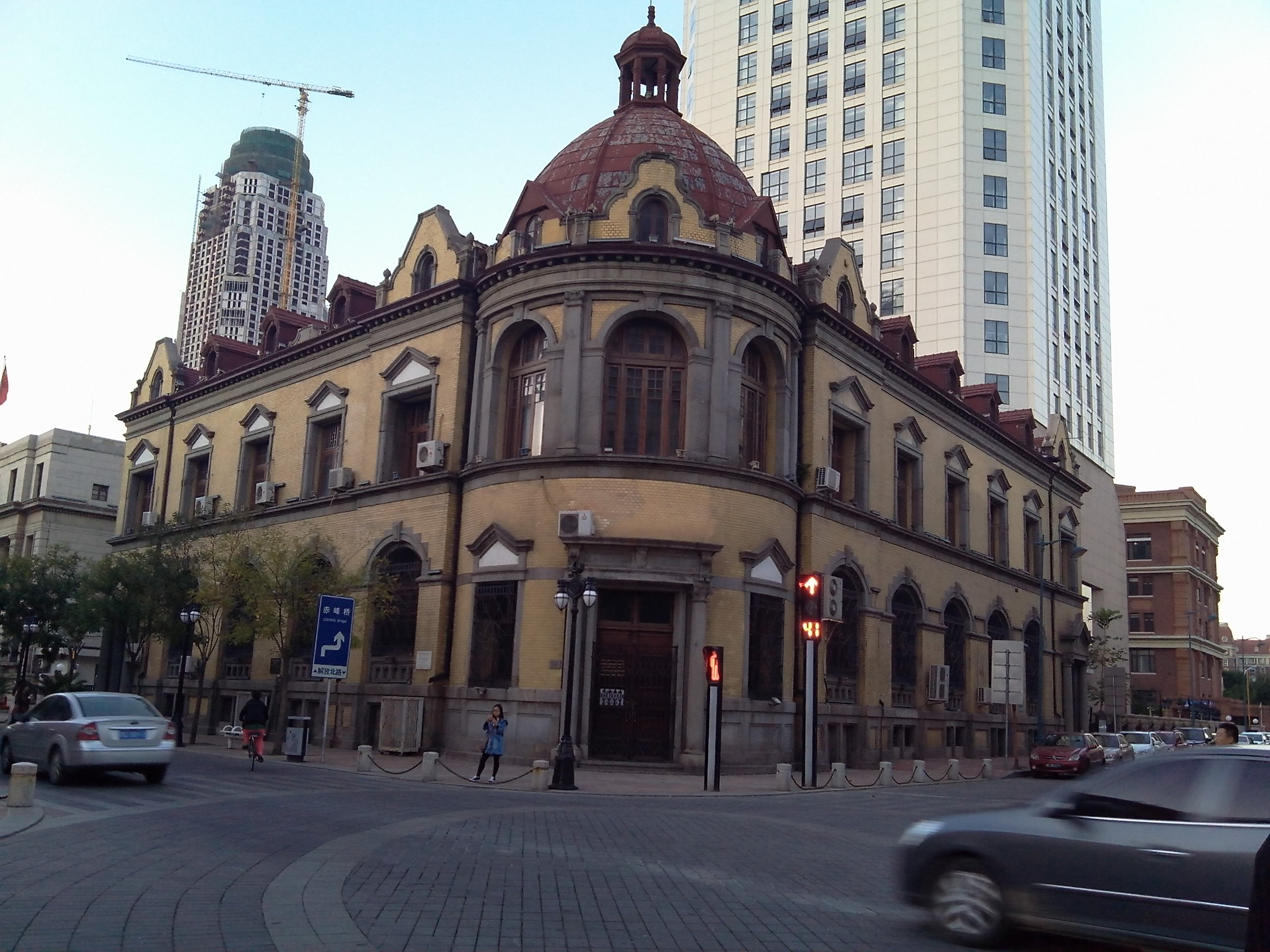
The Russo-Asiatic House on Victoria Road, built in 1896

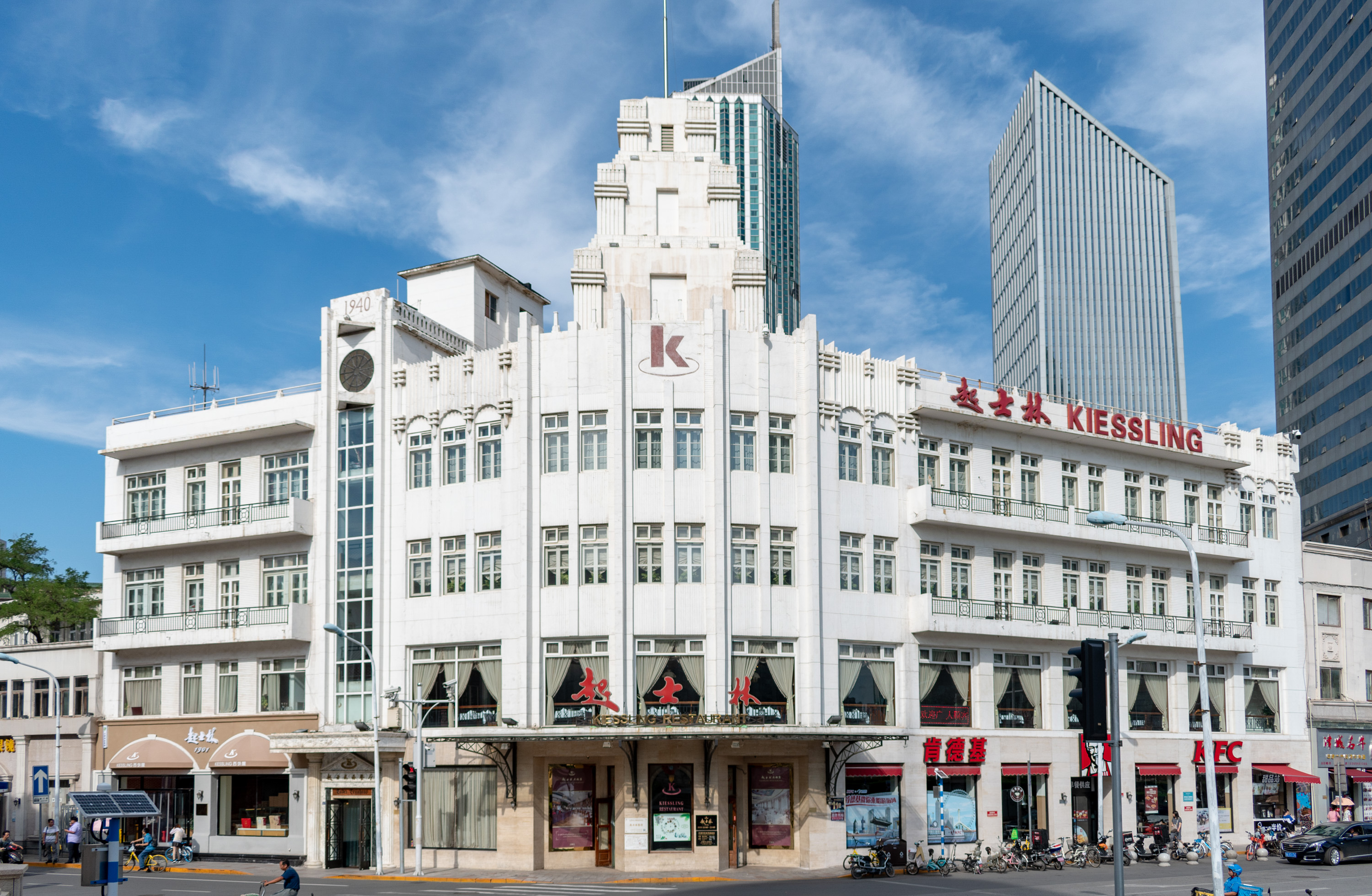
Victoria Restaurant, built in 1940, now Kiessling Restaurant

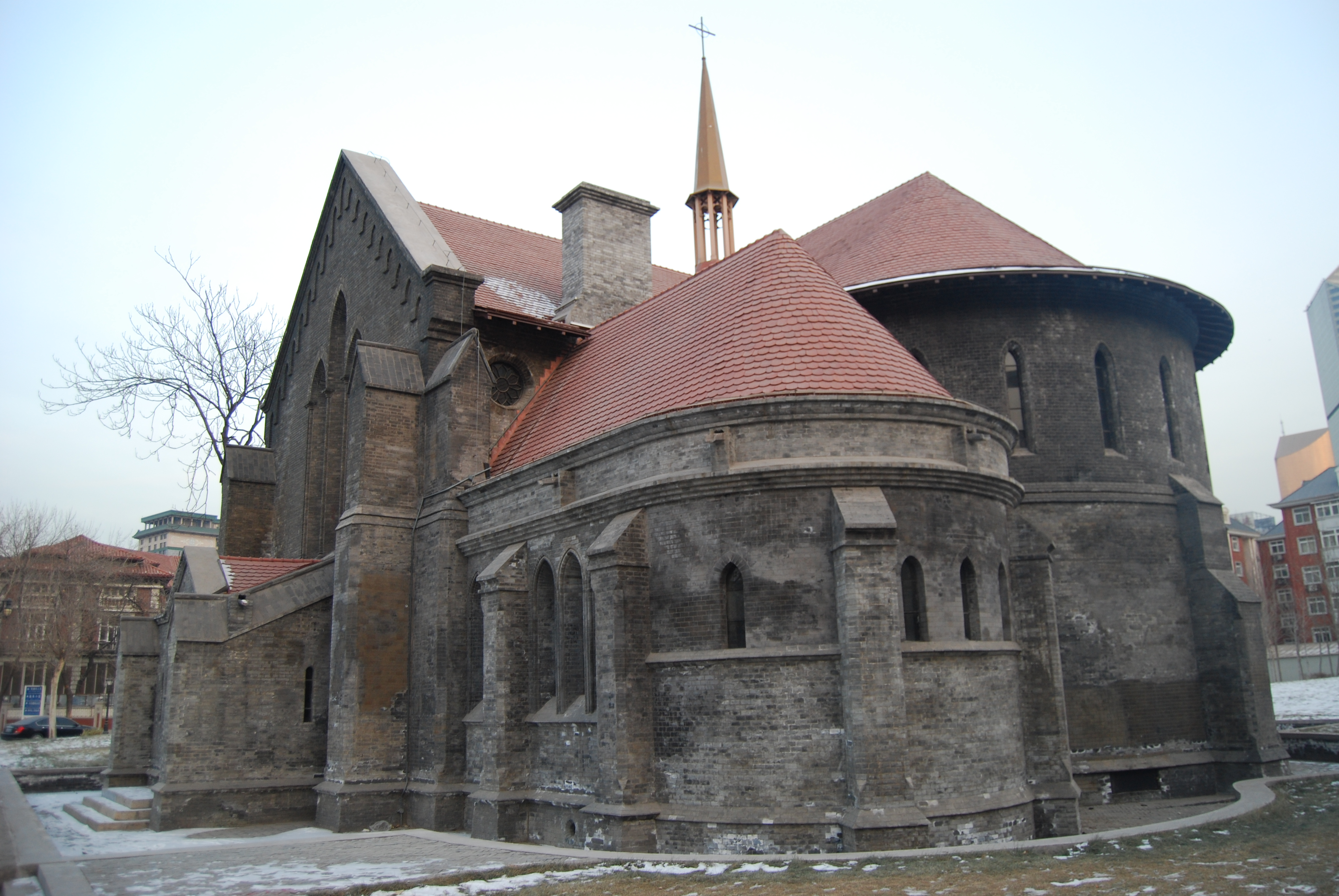
All Saints' Church, or Episcopal Church, built in 1936

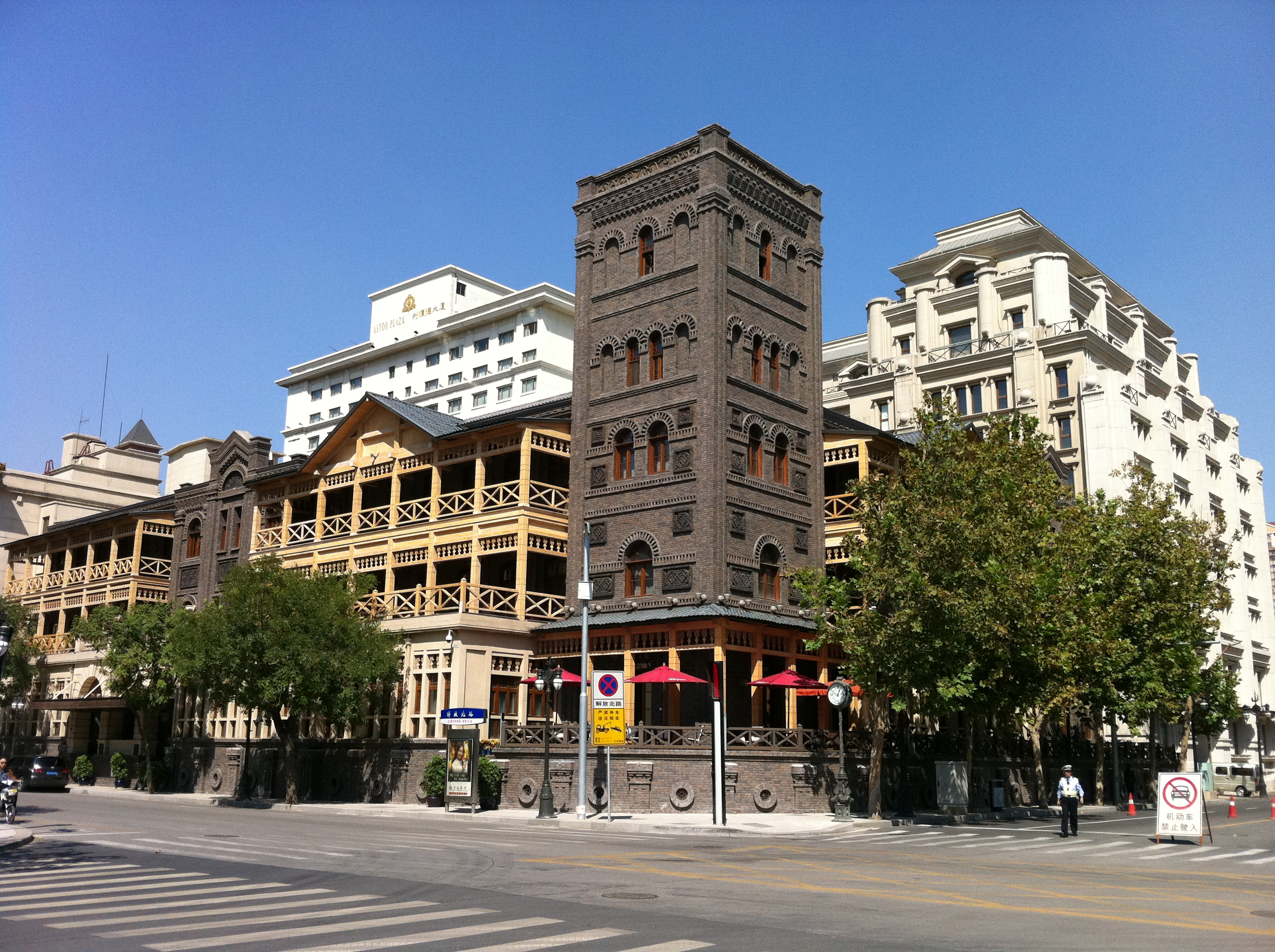
The Astor Hotel on Victoria Road, built in 1886, was one of the oldest structures in the British concession.

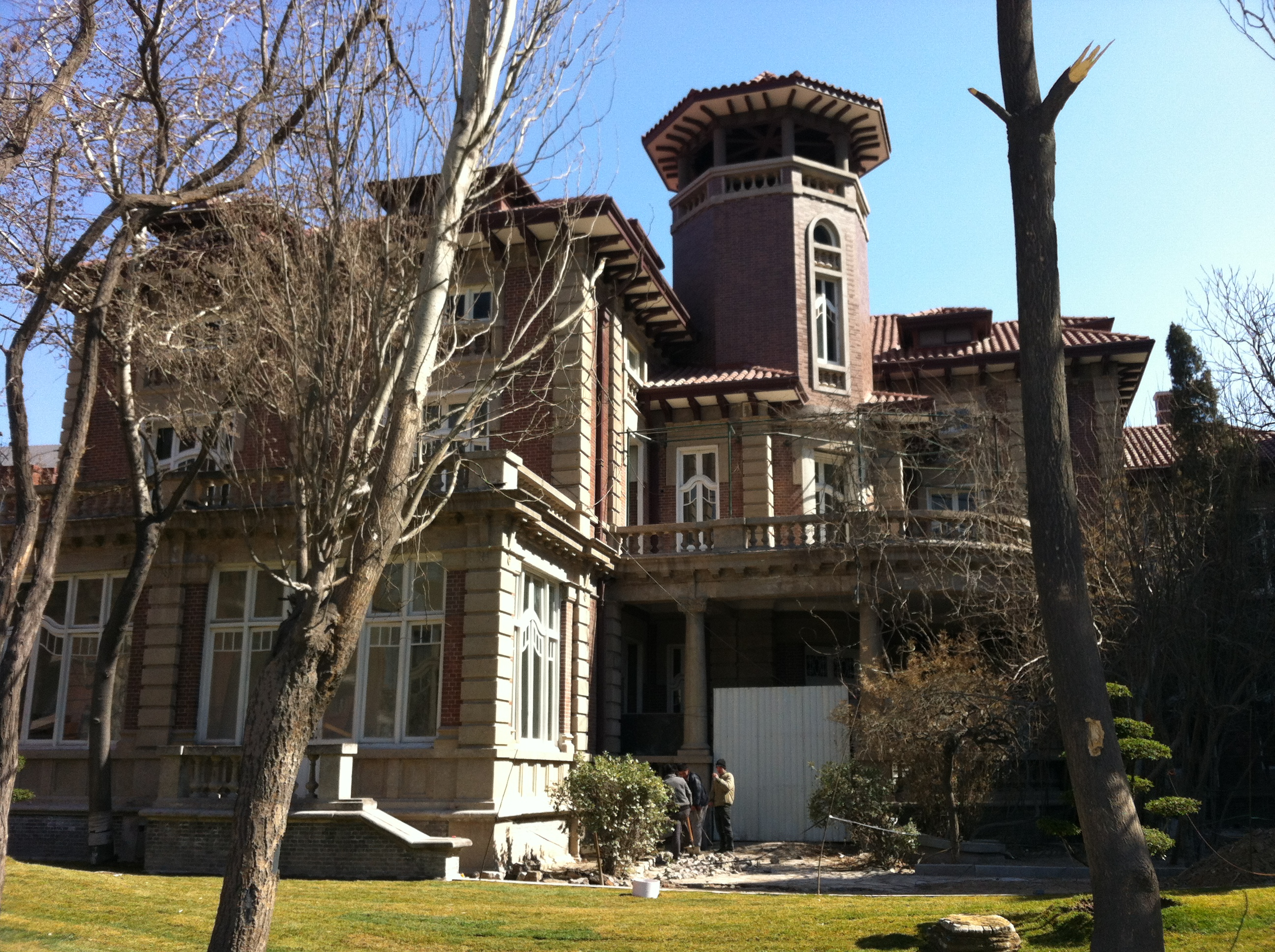
The British Consul-General's Mansion, built in 1937

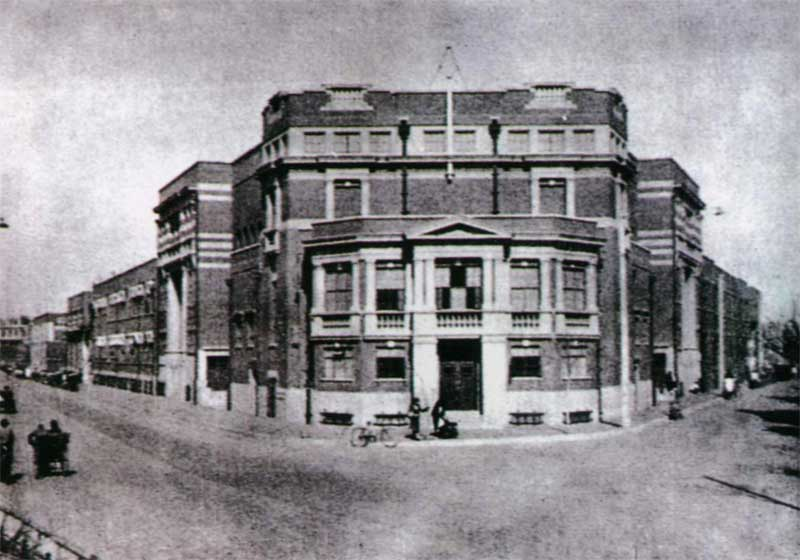
The auditorium of Tienchin Kung Hsueh (now Yaohua High School) in the 1940s

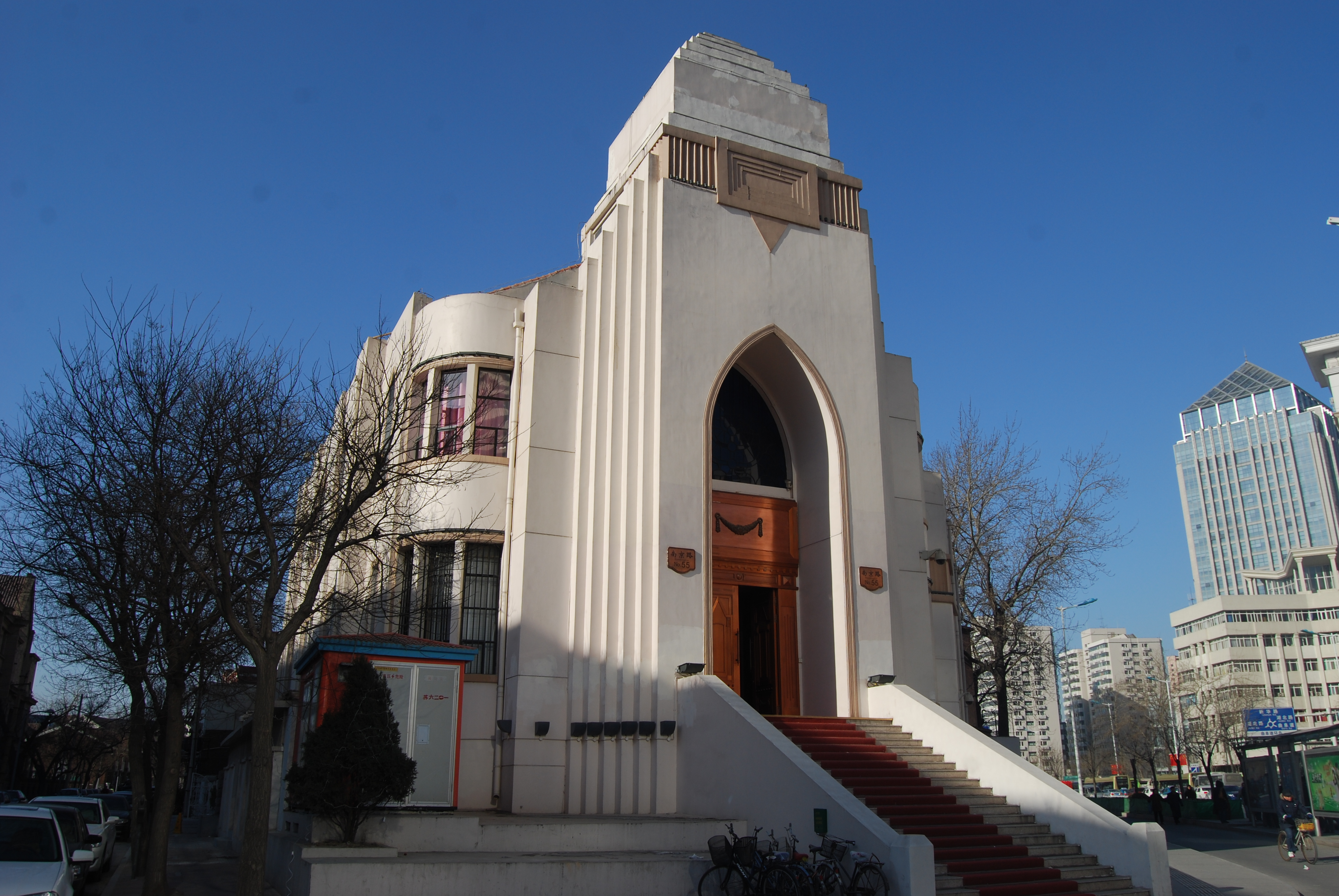
Tientsin Synagogue, built in 1940

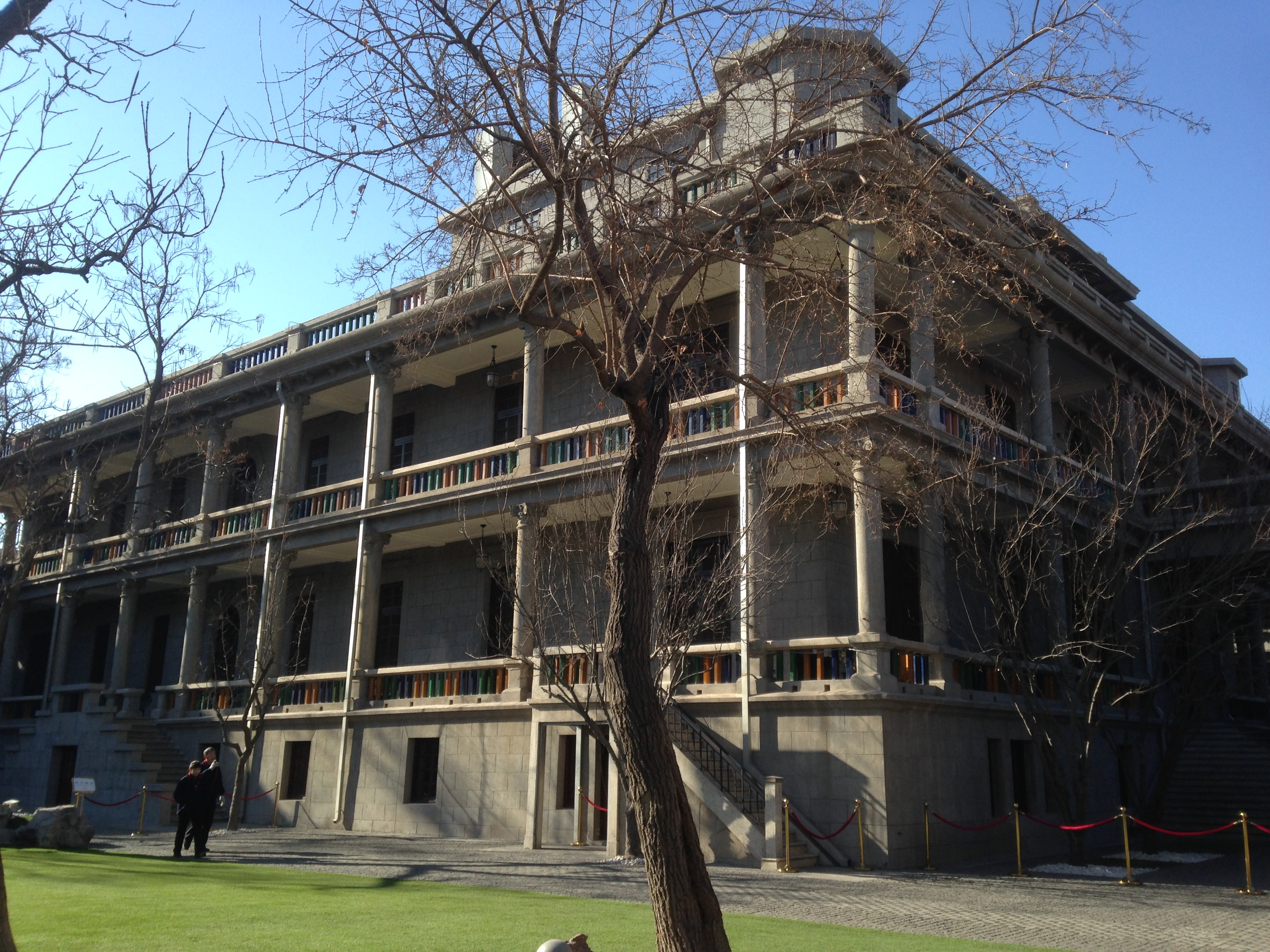
Prince Ching's Mansion in the Extra Rural Extension

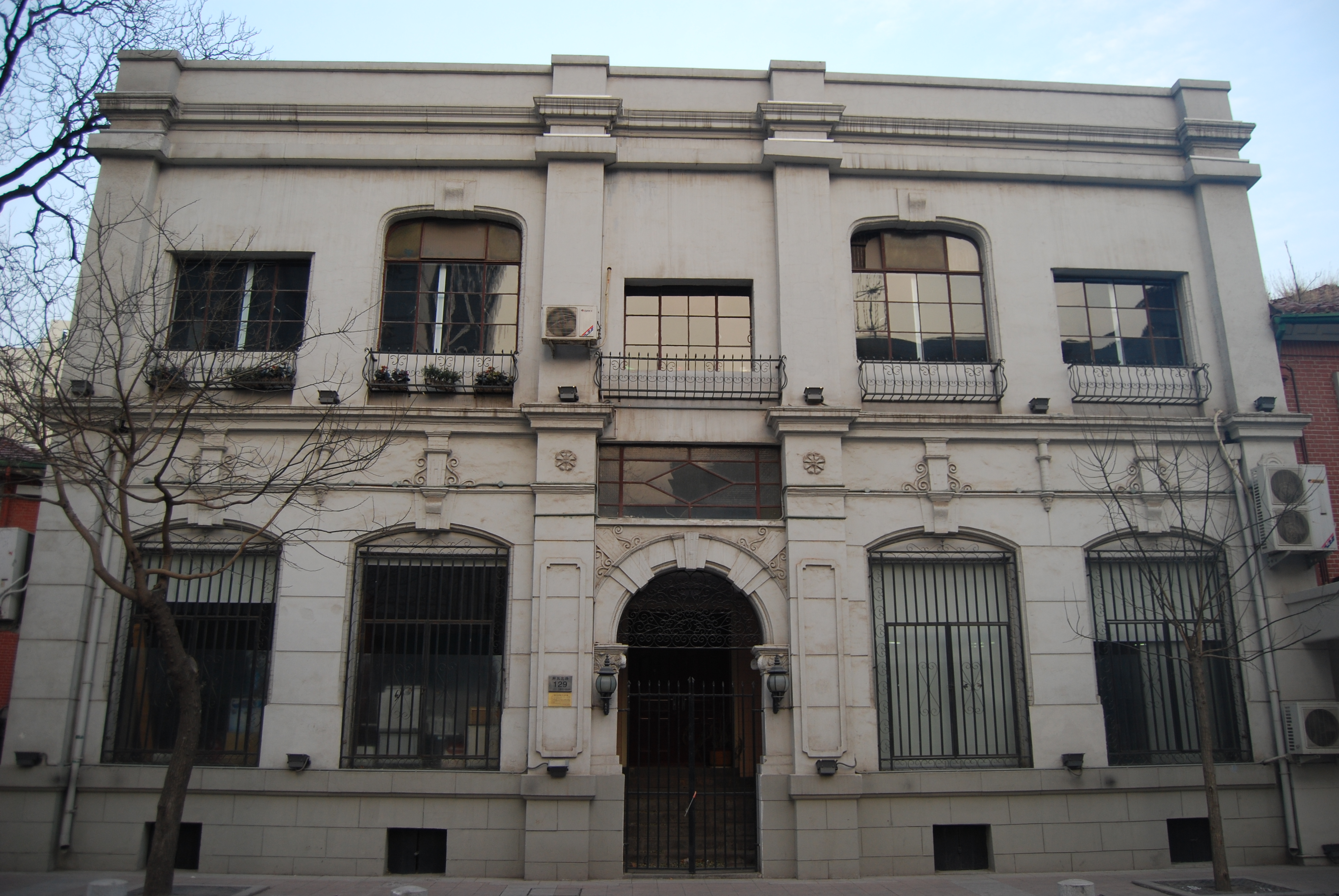
The Gibb, Livingston & Co. Building on Consular Road

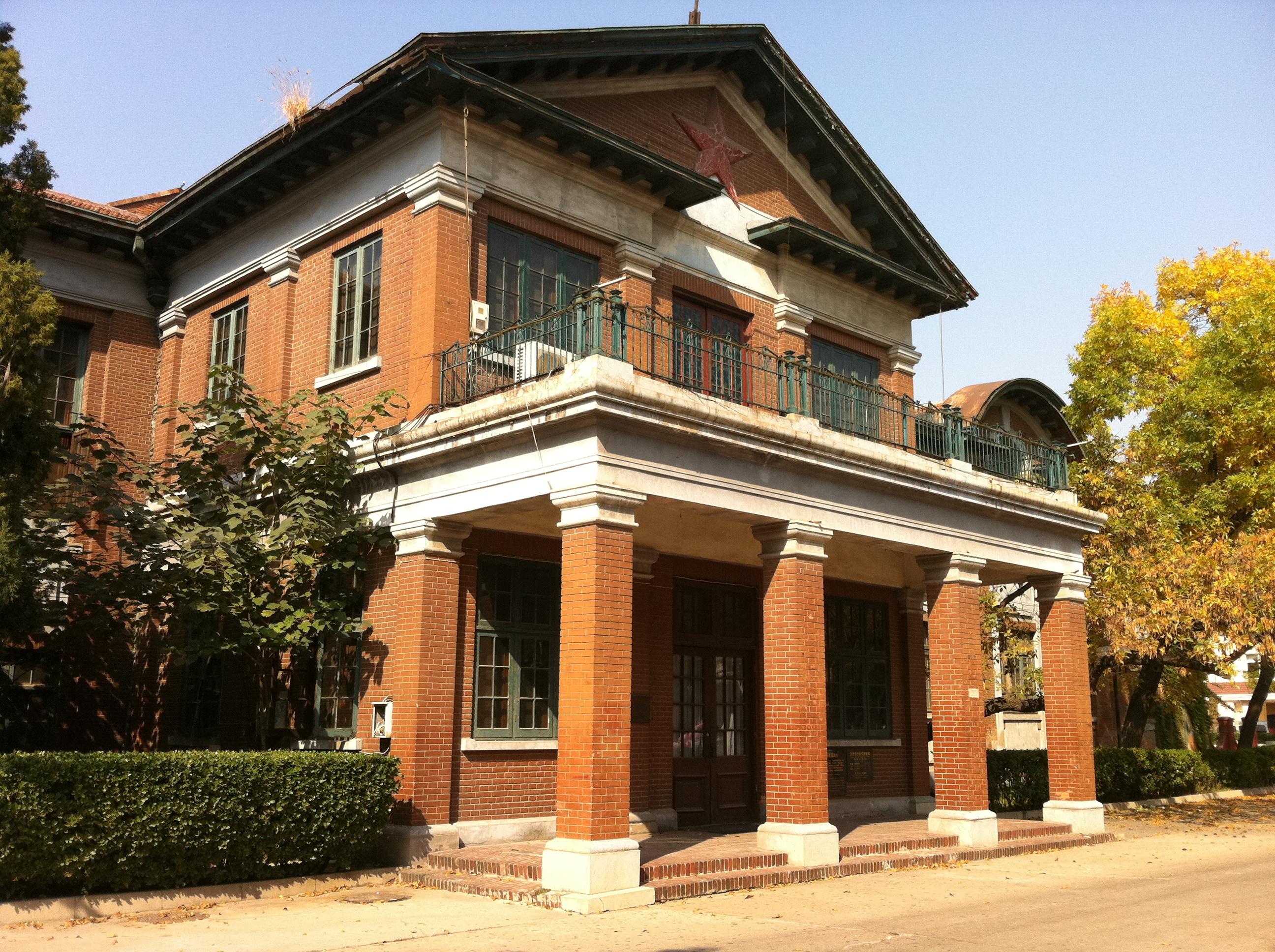
Tientsin Country Club, built in 1925

== List of consuls-general ==
- James Mongan (1860–1877)
- William Hyde Lay (1870, acting)
- Sir Chaloner Grenville Alabaster (1877–1885)
- Byron Brenan (1885–1893)
- Henry Barnes Bristow (1893–1897)
- Benjamin Charles George Scott (1897–1899)
- William Richard Carles (1899–1901)
- Lionel Charles Hopkins (1901–1908)
- Sir Alexander Hosie (1908–1912)
- Sir Henry English Fulford (1912–1917)
- William Pollock Ker (1917–1926)
- James William Jamieson (1926–1930)
- Lancelot Giles (1928–1934)
- John Barr Affleck (1935–1938)
- Edgar George Jamieson (1938–1939)
- Oswald White (1939–1941)
- Sir Alwyne George Neville Ogden (1941, acting)

== See also ==
- Foreign concessions in Tianjin
- Foreign concessions in China
- Map of concessions in Tianjin (in Chinese)
- British Empire
