= Tianjin No. 20 High School =

- 天津市第二十中学
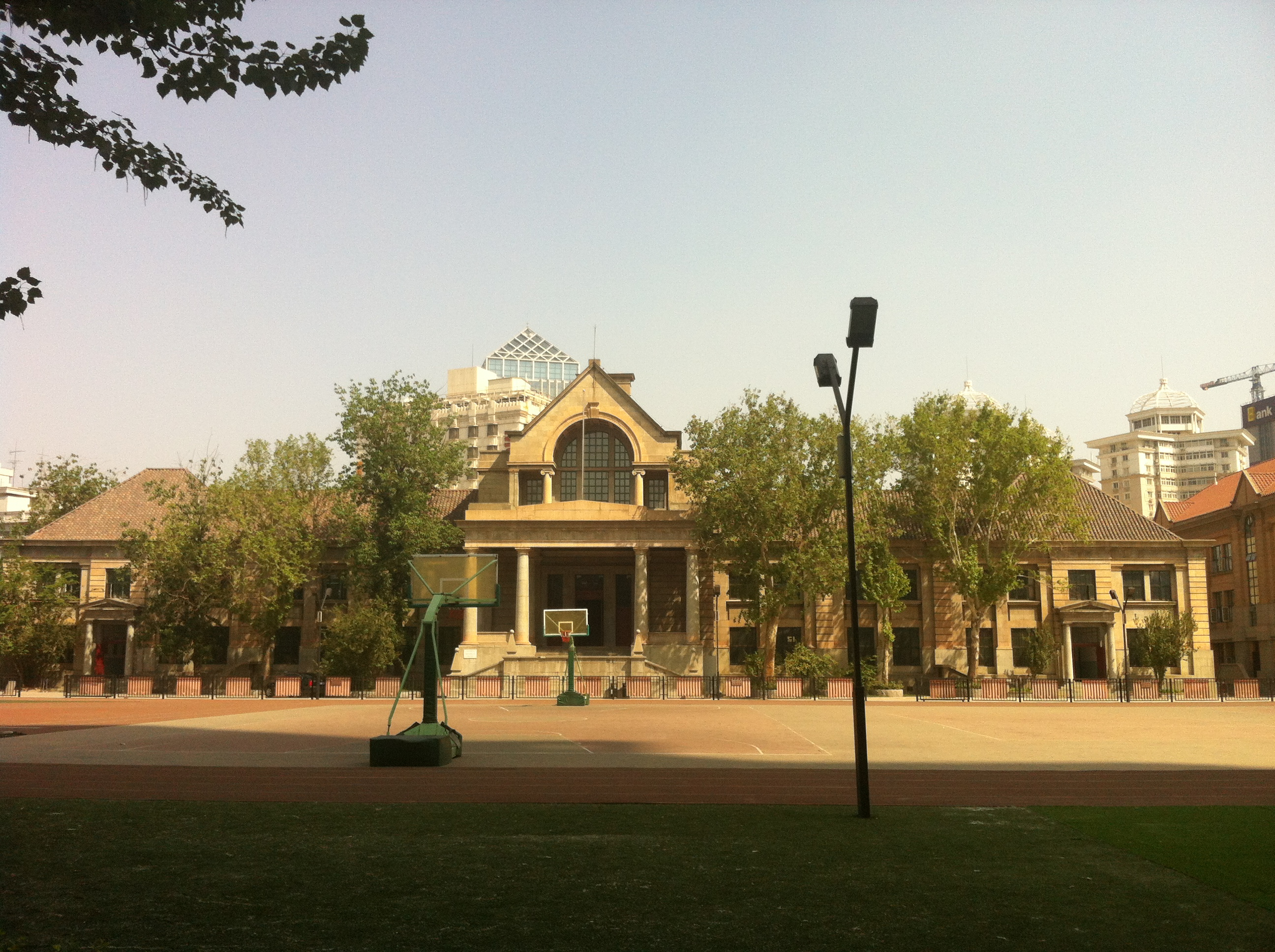
- Tianjin British Grammar School, the predecessor of Tianjin No. 20 High School, in 2012

Location
- 59 Hubei Road; Heping District, Tianjin; China

Information
- Type: Public
- Established: 1952
- Website: http://20ms.edu-dc.cn/ (in Chinese)

Chinese name
- Traditional Chinese: 天津市第二十中學
- Simplified Chinese: 天津市第二十中学
Transcriptions
Standard Mandarin
- Hanyu Pinyin: Tiān Jīn Shì Dì Èr Shí Zhōng Xué
Yue: Cantonese
- Jyutping: Tin^{1} Zeon^{1} Si^{5} Dai^{6} Ji^{6} Sap^{6} Zung^{1} Hok^{6}

Tianjin No. 20 High School (Chinese: 天津市第二十中学) is a public secondary school in Heping District in Tianjin.

== History ==
Tianjin No. 20 High School is among the first batch of "municipal key schools". It was established in 1952 after the merger of Tianjin Private Zhejiang High School (Chinese: 天津私立浙江中学), a secondary school established in 1910, and Jinhua Girls' High School (Chinese: 津华女子中学), a secondary school established in 1939. Attached to the high school is a primary school that was established in 1948.

The Tianjin Municipal Education Commission selected Tianjin No. 20 High School as an "experimental school" in 2011. In 2016, it completed the requirements to become a "special, distinctive school".

== Notable alumni ==
- Israel Epstein – he attended Tianjin British Grammar School, the predecessor of Tianjin No. 20 High School.
