= Yaohua High School =

School in China

Coordinates: 39°07′03″N 117°11′40″E

- Chinese: 耀华中学
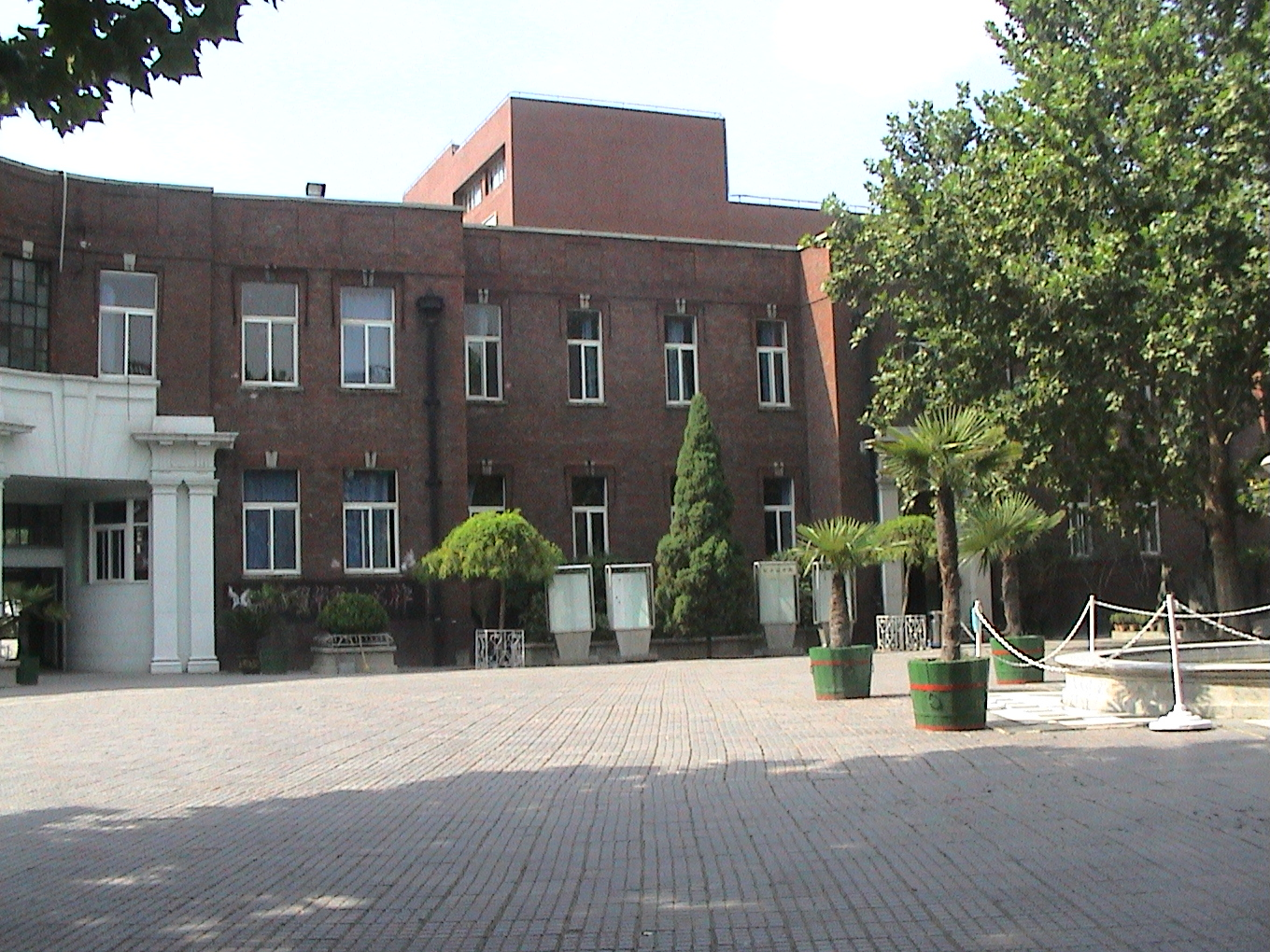

Information
- Established: 1927; 99 years ago
- Teaching staff: 315
- Enrollment: 2,767 (2013)

Yaohua High School (Chinese: 耀华中学; pinyin: Yàohuá Zhōngxué) is a key school directly under the Tianjin Municipal Committee of Education, in the People's Republic of China.

== History ==
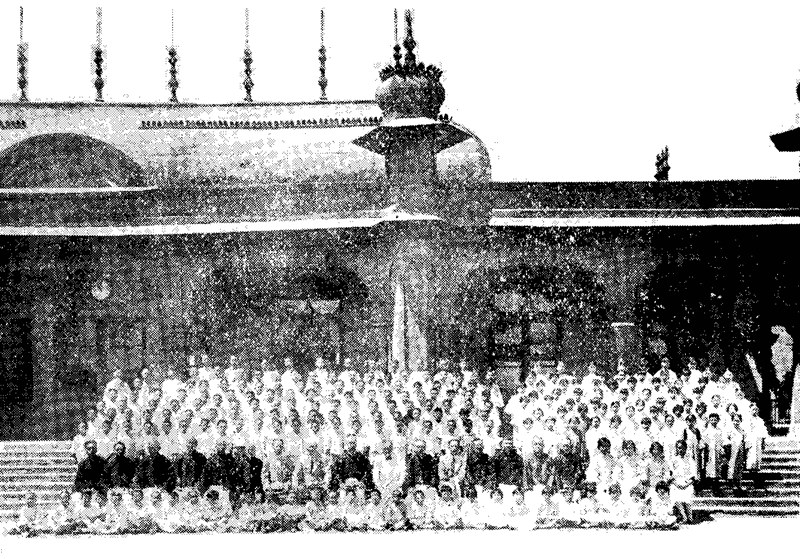
Photograph of Tianjin Gongxue at its founding in 1927

=== British Concession Tianjin Gongxue period (1927–1933) ===
In the early 1920s, the British Municipal Council of the Tianjin British Concession established the British Grammar School, but only children of foreign taxpayers were permitted to enroll. On January 20, 1926, Zhuo Lefeng (then a Chinese director of the British Concession Council), together with Chen Jixi, sent a letter to the Council proposing that Chinese residents in the concession should also have access to schools and hospitals, arguing that since Chinese residents were taxed, part of the revenue should be used for public services such as education. The Council later discussed the proposal and replied that British schools were funded by donations from British residents in Tianjin, and that Chinese schools could be established if similar fundraising could be arranged. The Council also agreed to allocate a site for the school and to fund construction and operating expenses through a levy of 0.18% of annual Chinese tax revenue in the concession, and the school was named “Tianjin Gongxue”.

In 1927, Zhuo Lefeng, then a Chinese taxpayer director in the British Concession, together with Zhong Huisheng and Feng Zhongwen, raised 34,000 taels of silver to establish Tianjin Gongxue. Wang Longguang, supervisor of Beiyang University, was appointed principal. The school was initially located at 37 Gordon Road in the British Concession. On August 14, 1927, Tianjin Gongxue published an enrollment advertisement in the Ta Kung Pao newspaper for boys, scheduling entrance examinations for August 22. On August 23, a second notice announced that girls would also be admitted due to remaining vacancies.

Tianjin Gongxue was positioned as an elite British-style school serving taxpayers in the concession, receiving annual subsidies equivalent to 1.8% of Chinese tax contributions. A school management association (Tianjin Gongxue Custodial Board) was also established to oversee administration under agreement with the concession authorities. On September 1, 1927, the school officially opened with 33 students, increasing to 46 by the end of the first term.

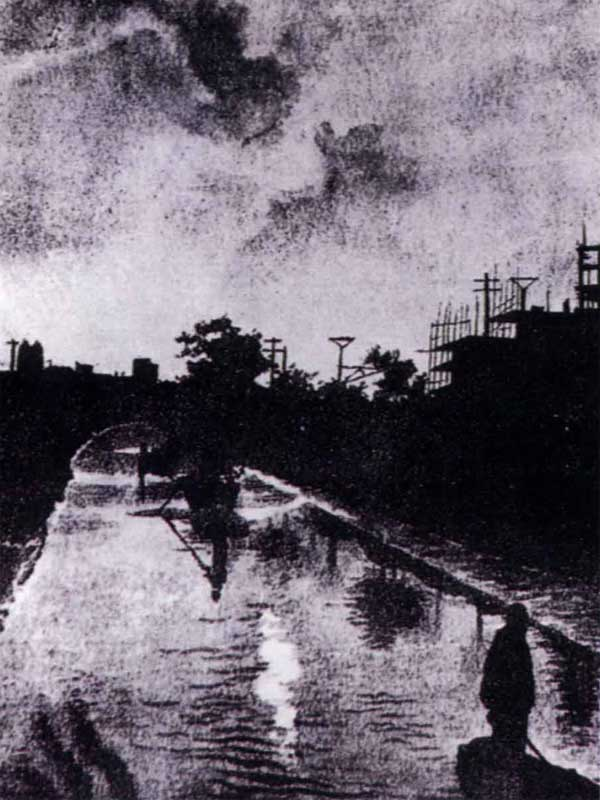
Construction of the Yaohua school campus

In 1928, the school temporarily relocated to the former Tianjin English School site on Hongqiang Road (today's Xinhua Road). A higher primary section was added, but increasing enrollment demand exceeded capacity. Chinese board members repeatedly requested funding from the British Concession authorities for new buildings, but were refused due to financial constraints. Consequently, Chinese directors raised funds independently, led by Zhuo Lefeng. As a result of his fundraising efforts, Zhuo also gained influence over principal and faculty appointments, leading to the resignation of the first principal Wang Longguang.

During the late 1920s wave of “educational sinicization,” the school transitioned fully into Chinese control and became a private institution. In July, Yan Songzhang, a Harvard-trained Doctor of Engineering, became principal. He prioritized hiring graduates from Tsinghua University and Peking University. That same year, land of 52.945 mu along the Wanchuan River was acquired for expansion, and British architects were commissioned to design new buildings. Laboratory equipment for physics, chemistry, and biology was imported from abroad. In 1929, the first campus building was completed for the boys' middle school; in 1930, a second building was completed for the primary school. By 1930, the middle school had expanded to over 600 students and 30 faculty members.

In 1931, a school management committee was established as the highest governing body, chaired by Zhuo Lefeng, Zhong Huisheng, Wu Lianpo, and others including British member De Fulang. A third building was completed, serving as laboratories and a girls' school section.

In April 1931, debates arose within the British Concession taxpayers' assembly regarding subsidies for the school. British taxpayers argued for reduced funding, while Chinese representatives called for equal treatment with British schools. The concession authorities ultimately affirmed continued support.

In 1932, construction began on an auditorium at the eastern end of the campus, costing 280,000 taels of silver. By 1933, enrollment reached 802 students, and the school had taken initial shape.
