= Gustav Detring =

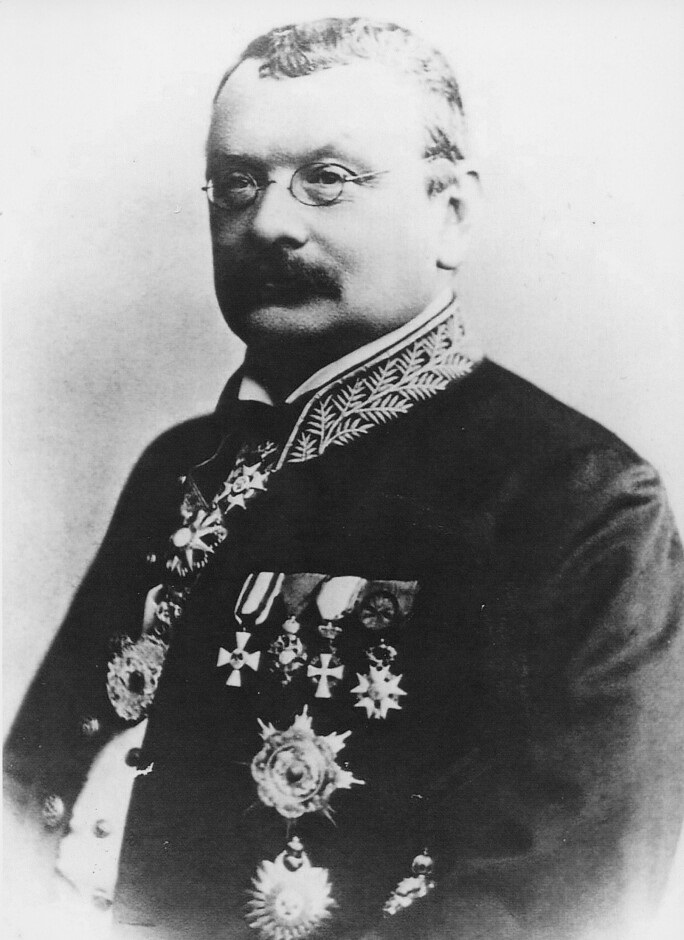
- Born: 1842
- Died: 4 January 1913 (aged 70–71)
- Occupation: Customs Commissioner at Tianjin

Gustav Detring (1842 - 4 January 1913) was a German-born British official of Chinese Customs. He was appointed Customs Commissioner at Tianjin in 1877 where he worked under the patronage of Li Hongzhang. From 1878 to 1893 he was chairman of the board of directors of the British municipal council in Tianjin.

== Early life ==
Gustav Detring was born in Germany in 1842.

== Career ==
He was appointed Customs Commissioner at Tianjin in 1877 where he worked under the patronage of Li Hongzhang. From 1878 to 1893 he was chairman of the board of directors of the British municipal council in Tianjin. A supporter and speculator in China's burgeoning railroad and mining market, Detring resigned from his post in Tianjin in 1904 following a dispute on the ownership of the Kaiping Mining Company and subsequent conflict with Yuan Shikai.

== Death ==
Detring died on 4 January 1913.
