= Lao Xikai Incident =

1916 protest movement in Tianjin, China

Lao Xikai Incident (Chinese: 老西开事件) was a protest movement that took place in 1916 in Tianjin, China, triggered by an attempt by the French concession in Tianjin to further expand its territory, which provoked opposition from local residents.

== Background ==
The French concession in Tianjin was established in 1861. In its early stage, it covered 439 mu of land near Zizhulin Village on the west bank of the Hai River, with its southwestern boundary along Haidao (present-day Dagubei Road). During the Boxer Rebellion in 1900 (the 26th year of the Guangxu reign), France joined the Eight-Nation Alliance and occupied Tianjin. On November 20, the French Consul-General in Tianjin, Paul Claudel, announced the southwestward expansion of the French concession in Tianjin to the Qiangzi River (present-day Nanjing Road (Tianjin)), increasing its area fourfold to 2,360 mu. More than a year later, in 1902 (Guangxu 28), France attempted a further expansion. The French concession in Tianjin, Auguste Roux, formally requested Tang Shaoyi, the Daotai of Tianjin Customs, to incorporate the Lao Xikai area—covering 4,000 mu southwest of the Qiangzi River—into the concession. Tang Shaoyi did not respond to the request.

Soon afterward, on January 14, 1903, the British concession in Tianjin successfully expanded southwestward beyond the Qiangzi River to Haiguangsi Avenue, acquiring an additional 3,928 mu known as the "British Extra Rural Extension," bringing its total area to 6,149 mu. Encouraged by this development, the French concession continued to seek opportunities for further southwestward expansion.

In 1912, the Holy See issued a decree establishing the Diocese of Tianjin, separated from the Archdiocese of Beijing, with its Cathedral at Our Lady of Victory Church, Tianjin in the Sanchahekou area of Tianjin. The first bishop, Paul-Marie Dumond (French Congregation of the Mission Society, considered Our Lady of Victory Church, Tianjin, located in the old city, unsuitable for future expansion. He therefore purchased a tract of Peatland in the Lao Xikai area, adjacent to the southwestern edge of the French concession in Tianjin, and constructed a new cathedral—St. Joseph Cathedral (Tianjin). Around it, a cluster of church institutions was gradually established, including Xikai Primary School, Ruose (St. Joseph) Primary School, Shenggong Primary School, the Joseph Sisters' Franco-Chinese School (now No. 21 Middle School), and a Catholic hospital (today Tianjin Obstetrics and Gynecology Hospital). The church itself stood within Chinese-administered territory, with its main entrance facing Rue du Général Foch (present-day Binjiang Road (China)) inside the French concession in Tianjin.

In August 1913, construction of Xikai Church began. The municipal council of the French concession, claiming to protect the church, stationed police in the area. Meanwhile, the Tianjin Police Bureau deployed nine officers to guard Zhangzhuang Bridge (a wooden bridge), the necessary passage from the French concession to Lao Xikai across the Qiangzi River. This created a standoff between Chinese and French police forces in the Lao Xikai area.

After a year of confrontation, in July 1914, the French consul in Tianjin, Henri Bourgeois, sent a letter to the Zhili Negotiation Office, arguing that China's lack of response to earlier diplomatic notes, as well as its failure to object to French police deployment and road construction in Lao Xikai, implied tacit recognition of the area as part of the French concession. He therefore demanded that Chinese authorities withdraw their police forces. The Zhili authorities rejected this claim.

In September 1915, the municipal council of the French concession distributed leaflets in Lao Xikai, requiring local residents to pay taxes to the concession authorities. In the same month, a group of gentry and merchants in Tianjin established the Society for the Preservation of National Sovereignty and Territory, headed by Chamber of Commerce president Bian Yinchang, with Zhao Tianlin (Zhao Junda, president of Peiyang University, Protestantism) and Sun Ziwen as vice presidents. Committee members included Liu Zihe, Liu Junqing (Manager of Yishi Daily, Catholic Church), Song Zejiu (Protestantism), and Du Xiaoqin.

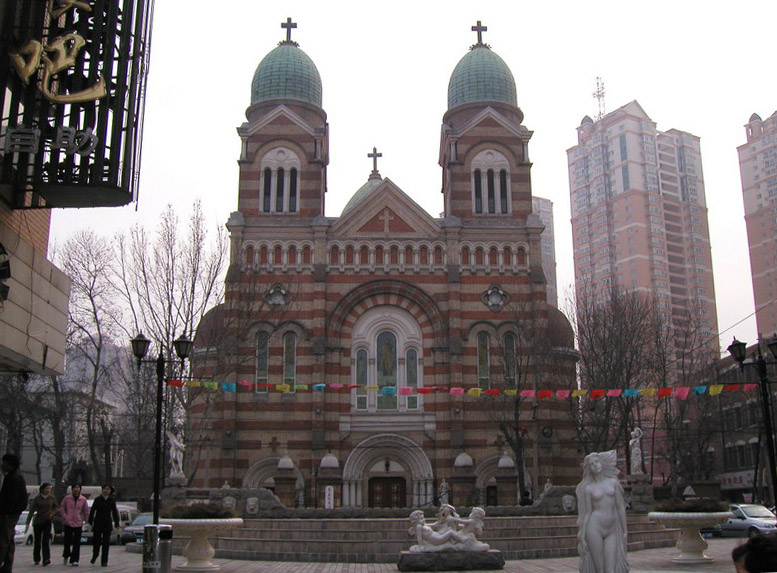
St. Joseph's Catholic Church in Xikai

== Process ==
In June 1916, the Lao Xikai Cathedral and its affiliated buildings were completed, and church institutions formally relocated there. The municipal council of the French concession in Tianjin then erected Flag of France and boundary markers on a triangular tract of nearly 50 mu in front of the cathedral, between present-day Dushan Road, Yingkou Road and Xining Road, declaring the area incorporated into the concession, and stationed Annamese (Vietnam) troops to guard it. The Chinese authorities made no explicit response. On October 17, the municipal council issued an ultimatum to Zhili Province, demanding that China relinquish Lao Xikai within 48 hours.

On the evening of October 20, the French consul in Tianjin led concession police and Annamese troops to disarm and detain Chinese police stationed at Zhangzhuang Bridge. This incident immediately sparked large-scale protests among Tianjin residents. On October 21, the Society for the Preservation of National Sovereignty and Territory mobilized several thousand people to demonstrate and petition the Zhili provincial yamen, the Negotiation Office, and the Provincial Assembly. On October 23, the Tianjin Chamber of Commerce resolved to boycott banknotes issued by French banks and French goods, and requested that the government telegraph the French government to demand the recall of the List of ambassadors of France to China. On October 25, more than 8,000 people from various sectors held a citizens' assembly, resolving to call nationwide for the severance of trade relations with France and to prohibit the sale of Chinese goods to France.

The Chinese government initially considered a compromise with France and was prepared to accept French occupation of Lao Xikai. However, as the anti-French movement in Tianjin intensified, Foreign Minister Chen Jintao submitted his resignation. On October 29, Acting Vice Minister of Foreign Affairs Xia Yiting was attacked by protesters while meeting their representatives at the Zhili Negotiation Office after expressing critical remarks, and was soon removed from office.

On November 12, workers, coolies, rickshaw pullers, domestic servants, and clerks employed by French firms—including the Yipin Company—within the French concession launched a general Strike action. The total number of Strike action reached 1,400, and the strike lasted for four months, effectively paralyzing the concession: the power plant ceased operation, and roads and garbage went unattended. At the same time, Chinese residents and merchants living within the concession initiated a movement to relocate to Chinese-administered areas.

== The Catholic Church and the Old West Kai Incident ==
During the Lao Xikai Incident, two clearly opposing factions emerged within the Catholic Church. The Belgian vicar apostolic Frédéric-Vincent Lebbe criticized the practice by which foreign missionary societies controlled the Catholic Church in China in accordance with their respective national interests. He advanced the slogan "China for the Chinese, and the Chinese for Christ," and on October 10, 1915, founded the newspaper Yi Shibao (China)in Rongye Street, Nanshi, Tianjin. During the incident, he actively supported Tianjin residents in opposing the expansion of the French concession in Tianjin. As a result, he was demoted by the French bishop Paul-Marie Dumond, reassigned to other regions, and in 1920 was repatriated to Europe.

== End and consequences ==
As French merchants in China suffered heavy losses and France was fully engaged in World War I, leaving it unable to intervene effectively in East Asian affairs, the French government instructed its minister in China at the end of 1916 to bring the Lao Xikai Incident to a swift conclusion. The French minister subsequently proposed to the Chinese government that the status quo be temporarily maintained and requested mediation by the List of ambassadors of the United Kingdom to China, Sir John Jordan. The Chinese government did not formally accept this proposal, and no agreement was reached between the two sides, leaving the Lao Xikai issue an unresolved dispute between China and France. In practice, the Lao Xikai area remained under a prolonged condition of joint Chinese–French control.

After the Japanese Tientsin Incident in Tianjin in 1931, the French concession in Tianjin came to exercise de facto control over the Lao Xikai area. However, it was not formally incorporated into the concession and instead remained an extraterritorial zone under illegal occupation by the French concession authorities.

== See also ==
- French concession in Tianjin
- St. Joseph Cathedral (Tianjin)
- Diocese of Tianjin
