= Our Lady of Victory Church, Tianjin =

Catholic church in China

Coordinates: 39.1467°N 117.1888°E

Our Lady of Victory Church (Chinese: 圣母得胜堂, French: Église Notre-Dame-des-Victoires), also known as Wanghailou Church (望海楼教堂), is a Catholic church located in Tianjin, China, which formerly served as the Cathedral church for the Diocese of Tianjin. It is one of the oldest churches in Tianjin.

== History ==
In 1773, salt merchants in Tianjin financed a construction of a 3-storey structure on this site, which was used as a temporary residence by the Emperor. The Qianlong Emperor bestowed upon it the name 'Haihe building' (海河楼).

In 1862, French missionary priest Jean-Joseph-Léon Talmier, through negotiations between the French consulate in Tianjin and Qing minister Chonghou, obtained a portion of land in Tianjin that included this site.

In 1869, the old construction was demolished and a church was built in its place dedicated to Our Lady of Victory. In 1870, the Tianjin massacre occurred and the church was destroyed along with other Catholic sites in Tianjin.

In 1897, the church was rebuilt using reparations funds from the Qing government. In 1900, the church was destroyed a second time when the Boxers arrived in Tianjin and attacked foreigners as well as Chinese Catholics. In 1903, the church was rebuilt again using reparations funds from the Qing government.

In 1912 the Diocese of Tianjin was officially established by Rome and Our Lady of Victory was made the cathedral for the diocese. In 1916, St Joseph's Cathedral replaced Our Lady of Victory as the cathedral.

In 1949, it was closed following the Communist revolution. It was partially re-opened later.

During the Cultural Revolution, it was vandalized by Red Guards.

It was heavily damaged during the 1976 Tangshan earthquake. The Tianjin municipal government rebuilt the church in 1983.

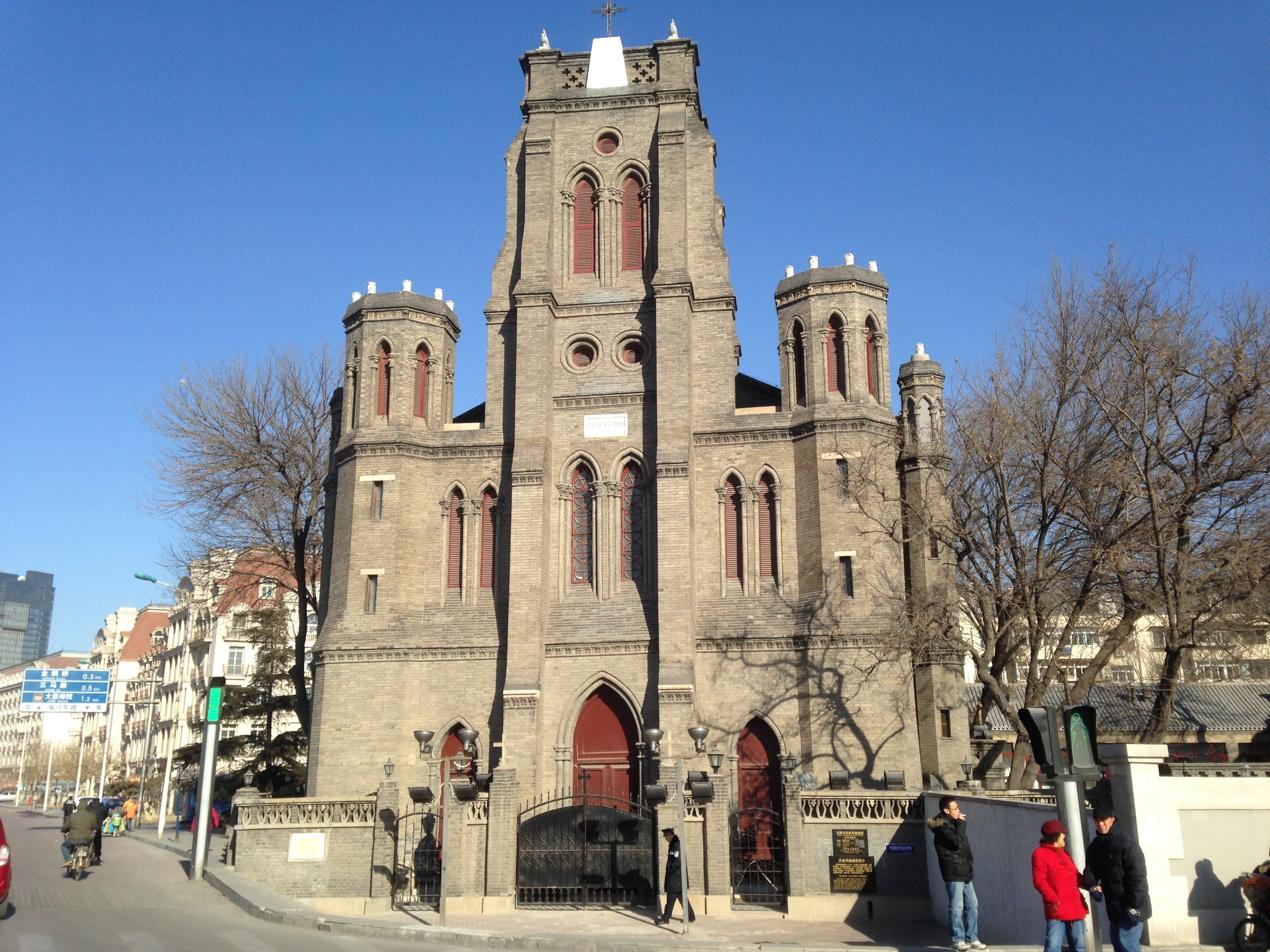
The church today

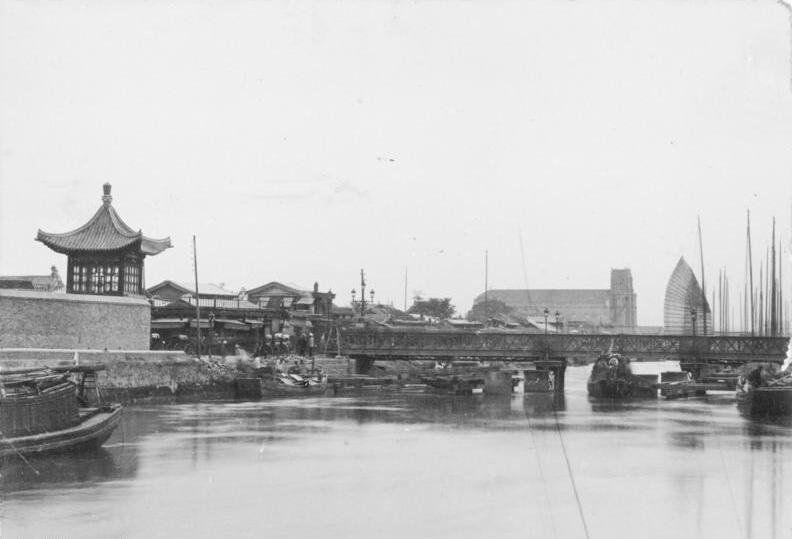
The church in 1898

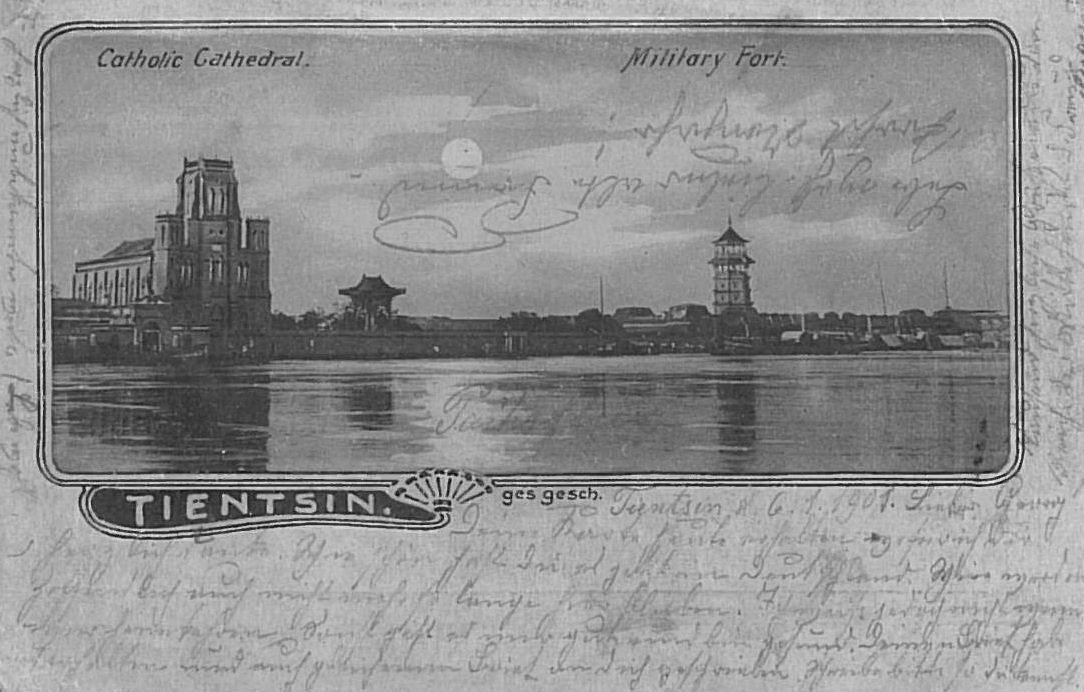
A postcard for the church in 1900
