= Xinhai Tianjin Uprising =

Failed 1912 uprising in Tianjin, China

Xinhai Tianjin Uprising was an armed action launched during the period of the 1911 Xinhai Revolution by revolutionary groups in Tianjin, then a center of the revolutionary movement in northern China. Its aim was to overthrow the rule of the Government of the Qing dynasty in the Tianjin area and to coordinate with the Northern Expedition of the Provisional government of the Republic of China (1912–1913). The uprising took place on the night of January 29, 1912, and ended in failure due to insufficient strength and inadequate preparation.

== History ==
=== Background ===
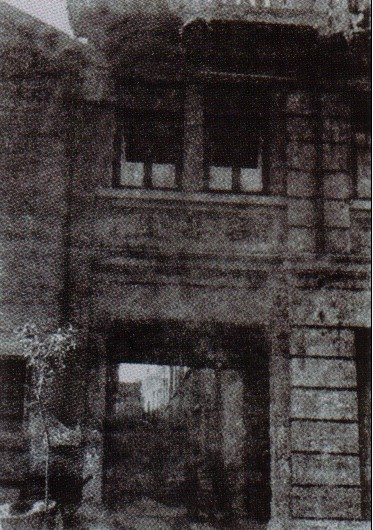
The former site of the Tianjin Revolutionary Party Military Command was located at No. 14 Jixiang Li, near the West Cathedral of the former French concession in Tianjin, and has now been demolished.

In early January 1912, Hu Egong(胡鄂公) traveled south from Tianjin to Shanghai, where he met with Chen Qimei, the Military Governor of Shanghai. After learning that Sun Yat-sen was actively planning a Northern Expedition, Hu proposed that revolutionary groups in northern China should launch armed actions to coordinate with it.

On January 13, 1912, Hu traveled to Nanjing to seek funding for northern revolutionary activities and met with Sun Yat-sen. Sun supported his proposal and immediately instructed Huang Xing to allocate 200,000 yuan from the Ministry of War.After returning to Tianjin, Hu convened an “Emergency Meeting of Representatives of Northern Revolutionary Associations” on January 27, 1912, in the French concession in Tianjin. At the meeting, he reported on his discussions with Sun Yat-sen in Nanjing and deliberated on establishing a Northern Revolutionary Army General Headquarters in Tianjin and launching an armed uprising.

The assembly elected Hu Egong(胡鄂公) as Commander-in-Chief of the Northern Revolutionary Army, while the timing of the uprising was to be decided by the headquarters as a military secret.

That same afternoon, the Northern Revolutionary Association held another meeting at No. 14 Jixiangli in the French concession, where detailed plans were formulated for the Tianjin uprising and coordinated responses in Beijing, Baoding, and Tongzhou.

The meeting set the uprising for midnight on January 29, 1912. The objective was to attack the Zhili Governor-General's Yamen, with forces divided into nine columns. Additional targets included the Tianjin Police Circuit Office, the Military Training Office, and transportation infrastructure including railways and bridges.

The plan further stipulated that, upon capturing the Zhili Governor-General's Yamen, the insurgents would immediately proclaim the establishment of the “Tianjin Military Government” (Jin Military Governor's Office) and proceed with appointing ministers to various departments of both the Northern Revolutionary Army General Headquarters and the new administration.

=== Uprising ===
On the evening of January 29, 1912, the first column of the insurgent forces, led by its commander Jiang Ciqing, assembled more than one hundred members of a dare-to-die corps to launch an assault on the Zhili Governor-General's Yamen in the Jingang Bridge area at Sanchahekou, where they engaged in fierce combat with Qing troops. The commander of the seventh column, Lin Shaofu, and the commander of the ninth column, Han Zuozhi, were killed in action in succession, while the other columns also ended in failure, with more than ten casualties.

Following the failure of the uprising, the Northern Revolutionary Army General Headquarters gathered armed forces from surrounding areas of Tianjin, including Zunhua, Yutian County, Hebei, Fengrun, Tangshan, Qian'an, Hebei, and Jinghai, Tianjin, in preparation for a second uprising.

However, at 11:00 a.m. on February 7, 1912, while plans were being formulated at Xiaobailou Subdistrict, the uprising organization was uncovered by subordinates of Yuan Shikai and the authorities of the British concession in Tianjin, leading to the arrest of a large number of revolutionaries.

At 3:00 p.m. on February 8, 1912,Hu Egong(胡鄂公), acting in the capacity of Commander-in-Chief of the Hubei Army's land and naval forces under the military government of the Republic of China and as plenipotentiary representative for northern revolutionary affairs, visited the British Consulate in Tianjin and lodged a protest with the British consul.

He accused the British authorities of violating neutrality, arguing that after the revolutionary forces had risen in Wuchang, Britain, France, Germany, Russia, and Japan had already recognized them as a belligerent party, and that the revolutionary army therefore had the right to confiscate Qing military funds and materiel. He further protested that British police had not only seized the funds confiscated by the revolutionaries but had also arrested their members, actions inconsistent with neutrality.

He warned that unless the arrested revolutionaries and seized funds were promptly released, he could no longer guarantee public order within the concession. In response, the British consul stated that the 6,000 yuan in funds had already been handed over to the Tianjin police authorities, but agreed that two detainees, Xiong Deshan and Zheng Xiaolan, would be released the following morning.

On February 9, 1912, several revolutionaries were released by the authorities of the British concession in Tianjin.

=== Result ===
On February 17, 1912, in light of Yuan Shikai having assumed office as Provisional President of the Republic of China, revolutionary groups in Tianjin convened representatives of northern revolutionary organizations at No. 14 Jixiangli in the French concession in Tianjin. The meeting resolved that all revolutionary activities by the various organizations were to cease or be dissolved as of that date.

It further declared that the headquarters of the Northern Revolutionary Association, the Northern Revolutionary Army General Headquarters, and their subordinate command structures in various localities were to be disbanded effective February 17, 1912.

On February 21, 1912, Hu Egong received a remittance of 20,000 yuan, wired at his request by Li Yuanhong, Military Governor of the Hubei Army. This sum was used as closing expenses for the Northern Revolutionary Association, primarily to arrange the repatriation of personnel who had remained in Tianjin.

== Related links ==
- 1911 Revolution
- Xinhai Shanghai Restoration
- Anti-Qing sentiment
