= Laoxikai Affair =

1915–1916 dispute between France and Republic of China

The Laoxikai Affair (or Laoxikai Incident; 老西開事件) was a 1915-1916 political and diplomatic dispute between France and the Republic of China. It developed out of an attempt by the French consulate to expand France's extraterritorial power in Tianjin outside of the French concession and into the Laoxikai district where a Catholic Cathedral had recently been built.

== History ==
=== Background ===
Following the British Empire's defeat of China in the First Opium War (1839–1841), European power expanded in China through the unequal treaties. France required China to sign the Sino-French Treaty of Huangpu in 1844. The foreign extraterritoriality created through the unequal treaties expanded throughout the 1840s and 1850s. Also beginning in the 1840s, France asserted its religious protectorate over the Catholic Church in China.

The French Concession in Tianjin was established in 1860 and expanded in 1901. The Laoxikai district was composed of about 500 acres of land and was adjacent to the French concession. In 1902, the French consul contacted Chinese authorities, requesting to annex Laoxikai district. Chinese authorities did not respond.

=== Dispute ===
Apostolic Vicar Paul Dumond purchased and developed swampland in Laoxikai district, pursuant to the Bethemy Convention, for a Cathedral.

The French consul in Tianjin sought to expand French extraterritorial jurisdiction beyond the French concession in Tianjin and used the newly built Cathedral as the mechanism to do so. The French built a road from the French concession to the consulate, installed posts along the road bearing the French tricolor, and imposed taxes on Chinese homes and businesses along the road.

Chinese residents protested the imposition of French authority, forming organizations such as a Society for Safeguarding Sovereignty and Territory and a National Salvation Foundation. They sought to organize strikes, boycotts of French goods and the use of French currency, and called for the French Chargé d'affaires to China and the French consul in Tianjin to be expelled from China. Among those who supported the Chinese residents was the Catholic missionary Frédéric-Vincent Lebbe, whose newspaper Yishibao published an open letter in support of the strikes and opposing the French expansion.

The dispute rose from the local to national levels, and the Chinese and French governments failed to initially resolve it.

On 20 October 1916, French police arrested nine Chinese police officers. Chinese residents in Tianjin responded by rioting. The Chinese government protested the arrests, and the French released the Chinese police officers and issued an apology.

Tensions remained over the incident, but were rendered moot by the Japanese occupation of Tianjin during the Second-Sino Japanese War, and France's relinquishing its colonial claims in China in 1946.
