= Qishiling Restaurant =

Restaurant in Tianjin, China

Tianjin Cultural Relics Protection Unit
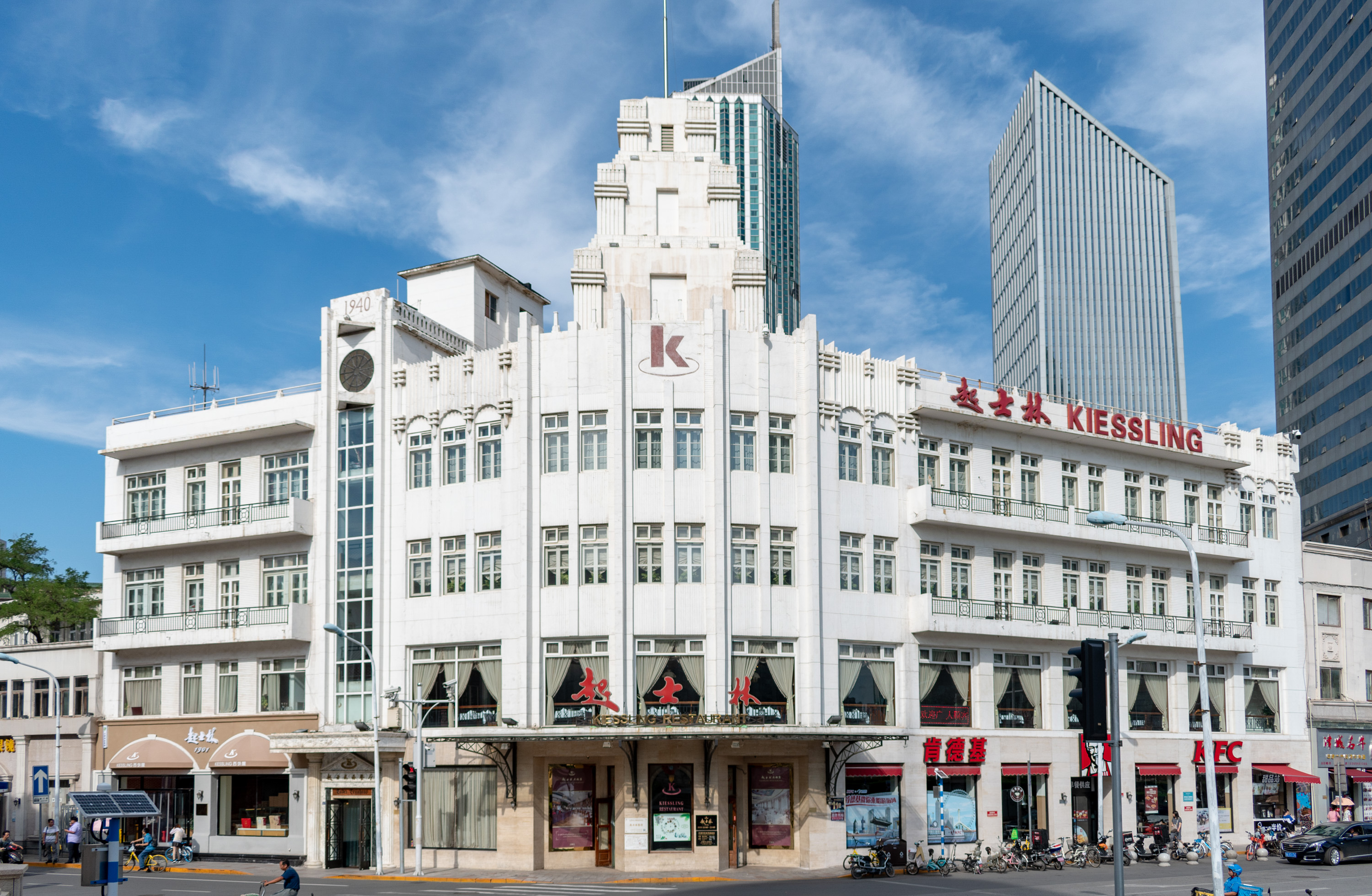
- Xiaobailou 21351-Tianjin (49063235813) Address: Heping District, Tianjin Category: Important modern and contemporary historical sites and representative buildings Era: 1940 Number: 4-57 Designation Date: January 5, 2013

Tianjin Municipal People’s Government
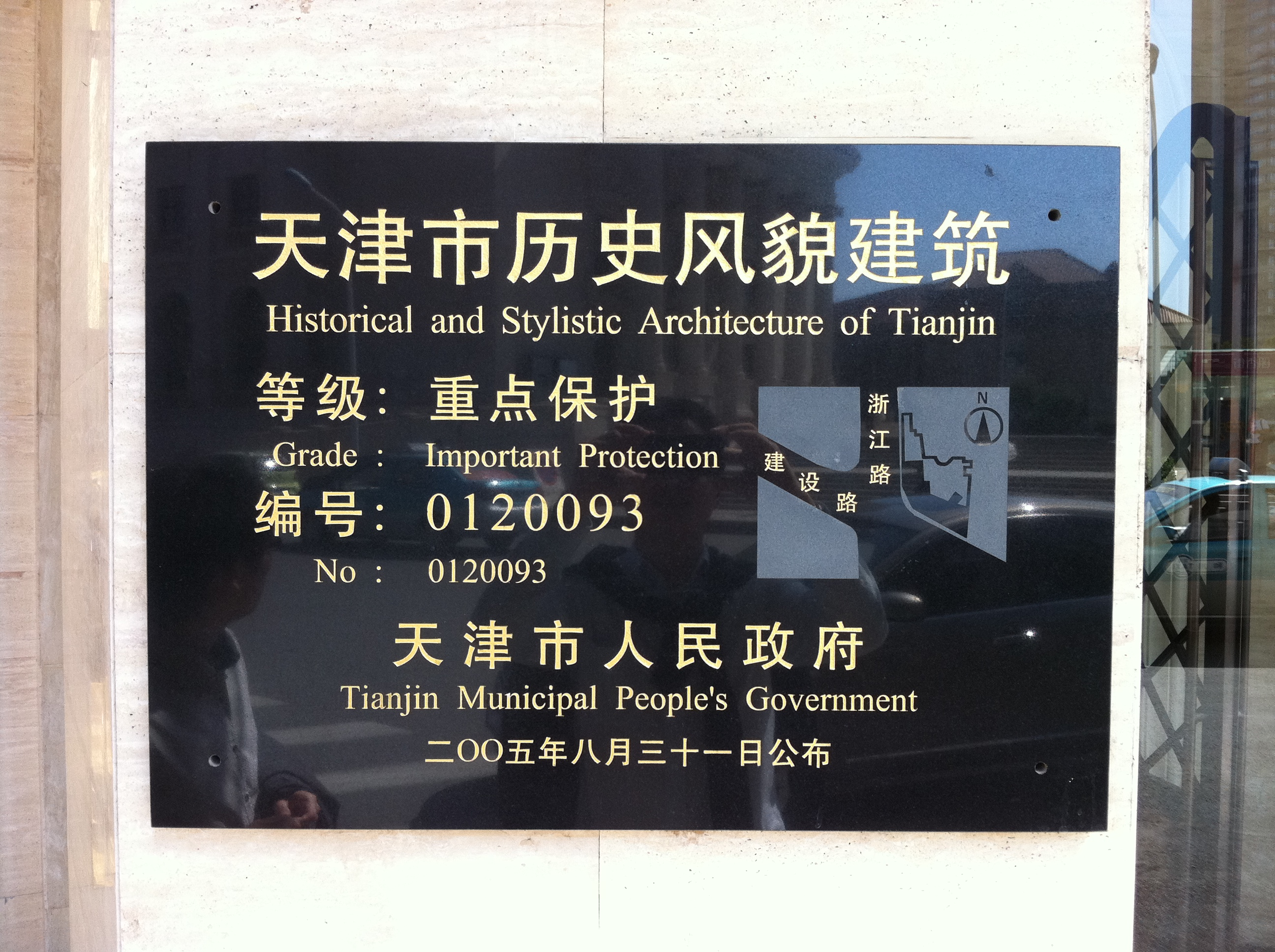
- 维克多力餐厅铭牌 Location: Heping District, Tianjin Construction Date: 1920 Plaque number: 0120093 Protection Grade: Important Protection

Qishiling (German: Kiessling), is one of the famous Western-style restaurants in Tianjin, China. In 1907, it was founded as well as opened by Albert Kiessling, a German. The location of it is on the Great French Road of the French Concession of Tianjin, which now is known as the Jiefang North Road, Heping District and William Street at the junction of Tianjin German Concession and the American Concession of Tianjin (Now Jiefang South Road, Hexi District). Time passed, it was then merged with Victori Restaurant, which was located at the intersection of Race Course Road and Davenport Road in Tianjin. Currently, it is known as No. 33 Zhejiang Road at the intersection of Zhejiang Road and Jianshe Road, Heping District.) Although the original appearance of the building has changed significantly, it is still a key protection level historical style building and a cultural relic protection unit in Tianjin. Qilin Restaurant was originally a direct unit of Tianjin Food Group. After the reform, it was controlled by Tianjin Ear Eye Fried Cake Catering Co., Ltd. Today, “Qishilin” is recognized as a time-honored Chinese brand.

History

Albert Kiessling (June 11, 1879 – January 11, 1955), the founder of the restaurant,

previously worked as a chef on ocean liners. In 1904, he worked at a German-owned Western restaurant in Hong Kong, and in 1906 he moved to Tianjin. Around 1907 (some sources say 1908), he opened Qishilin, serving authentic German-style Western food, along with bread and pastries. The original restaurant was located across from the French Club on Rue de France. During World War I, it was destroyed by local French residents, forcing it to relocate to William Street, where it later became the site of the Qishilin Food Factory. At one point, after bringing in a business partner named Bard, the restaurant was renamed “Kiessling-Bard.”

In 1934, Kiessling sold the restaurant to an Austrian named Robert Toebich and a German named Walter Reichel. Under their management, the restaurant expanded, adding a dance hall and an open-air dining area, and opening branches in cities like Nanjing, Shanghai, and Beidaihe. Even after the Japanese occupation of Tianjin in 1937, the restaurant continued operating and employed around 200 staff. In 1945, it was taken over by the U.S. military, and in 1949, after the founding of the People's Republic of China, it was placed under the control of the Tianjin municipal government. In 1954, Qishilin merged with Victoria Restaurant (originally called Yishunhe), which had opened in the early 1920s and specialized in Russian-style Western cuisine. After the merger, the combined establishment kept the name Qishilin. The bakery and pastry production were separated into a dedicated Qishilin Food Factory, producing cakes, candies, and chocolates. During the Cultural Revolution, the restaurant was renamed several times, including “Tianjin Restaurant” and “Workers, Peasants, and Soldiers Restaurant.” In 1970, employees petitioned Premier Zhou Enlai to restore the original name, and approval was granted within a week.

Later, new branches were opened in Tianjin and Beidaihe. In 1990, the restaurant was renamed “Qishilin Hotel,” expanding to include guest rooms, a dance hall, and karaoke facilities. A Beijing branch opened in 1998.

Cuisine

Today, Qishilin mainly serves German-style Western cuisine, along with dishes from Russian, British, French, and Italian traditions. Signature dishes include cream-baked assorted dishes, braised beef in a pot, and baked fish with cream sauce.
