= Treaty of Livadia =

1879 treaty between Russia and China

- Drafted: 2 October 1879
- Location: Livadiya, Crimea, Russian Empire
- Condition: Unratified; superseded by the Treaty of Saint Petersburg (1881)
- Signatories: (Qing dynasty) Chonghou; (Russian Empire) Nikolay Girs and Evgeny Butsov
- Parties: (Qing dynasty) China; (Russian Empire) Russia

Treaty of Livadia

Chinese name
- Traditional Chinese: 里瓦幾亞條約
- Simplified Chinese: 里瓦几亚条约
Transcriptions
Standard Mandarin
- Hanyu Pinyin: Lǐwǎjǐyà tiáoyuē

Russian name
- Russian: Ливадийский договор
- Romanization: Livadiyskiy dogovor

The Treaty of Livadia was an unequal treaty between the Russian Empire and the Chinese Qing dynasty signed in Livadiya, Crimea, on 2 October 1879, wherein Russia agreed to return a portion of the lands it had occupied in Xinjiang during the Dungan Revolt of 1862–1877, even though Qing forces obtained the area. As a result of its disapproval, the Chinese government refused to ratify it and the emissary who made the negotiations was sentenced to death (although the sentence was not carried out). Seventeen months later, the two nations signed the Treaty of Saint Petersburg, which apart from territorial matters, largely had the same terms as the Treaty of Livadia.

== Background ==
The Qing dynasty under the Qianlong Emperor conquered Xinjiang from the Dzungar Khanate in the late 1750s. However, Qing China declined in the late 19th century following the First Opium War. A major revolt known as the Dungan Revolt occurred in the 1860s and 1870s in Northwest China, and Qing rule almost collapsed in all of Xinjiang except for places such as Tacheng. Taking advantage of this revolt, Yakub Beg, commander-in-chief of the army of Kokand, occupied most of Xinjiang and declared himself the Emir of Kashgaria.

Russia was officially neutral during the conflict, but as a result of the Treaty of Tarbagatai in 1864, had already gained about 350,000 square miles (910,000 km^{2}) of territory in Xinjiang. Furthermore, the Russian Governor-General of Turkestan had sent troops into the Ili Valley in 1871, ostensibly to protect his citizens during the rebellion, but they had extensively built up infrastructure in the Ili capital of Ghulja. This was typical of the Russian strategy of taking control over a region and negotiating recognition of its sovereignty after the fact.

The Qing counterinsurgency, led by General Zuo Zongtang began in September 1876 and concluded in December 1877, having completely retaken the lands that were lost. During this time, Russia had promised to return all occupied lands to China.

== Terms of the treaty ==
The Treaty of Livadia actually consisted of two separate agreements.

=== Border treaty ===
The first treaty consisted of eighteen articles, and stipulated that:

1. Russia would return a portion of Xinjiang to China, keeping the western Ili Valley and the Tekes River – ensuring that Russia would have access to the southern portion of Xinjiang
2. In the lands that were being returned, Russia would retain any property rights it had established during the occupation
3. Any of the Dungan people who rebelled could choose to become Russian citizens, and those who did not would not be punished for their activities during the rebellion
4. Russia was given the right to open seven new consulates in Xinjiang and Mongolia
5. Russia could engage in trade without duties in Xinjiang and Mongolia
6. Russian merchants were given access to trade routes extending as far as Beijing and Hankou on the Yangtze
7. China would pay an indemnity of five million rubles to cover Russia's occupation costs and property losses

=== Commercial treaty ===
The second treaty contained seventeen articles that focused on the logistics of conducting trade, such as tax issues, passport requirements, and certification procedures, the total effect of which was very preferential to Russian commercial interests and represented unprecedented access to the Chinese interior. There was also an unrelated supplementary article that reaffirmed Russia's right to navigate the Songhua River as far as Tongjiang in Manchuria.

== Uproar in China ==
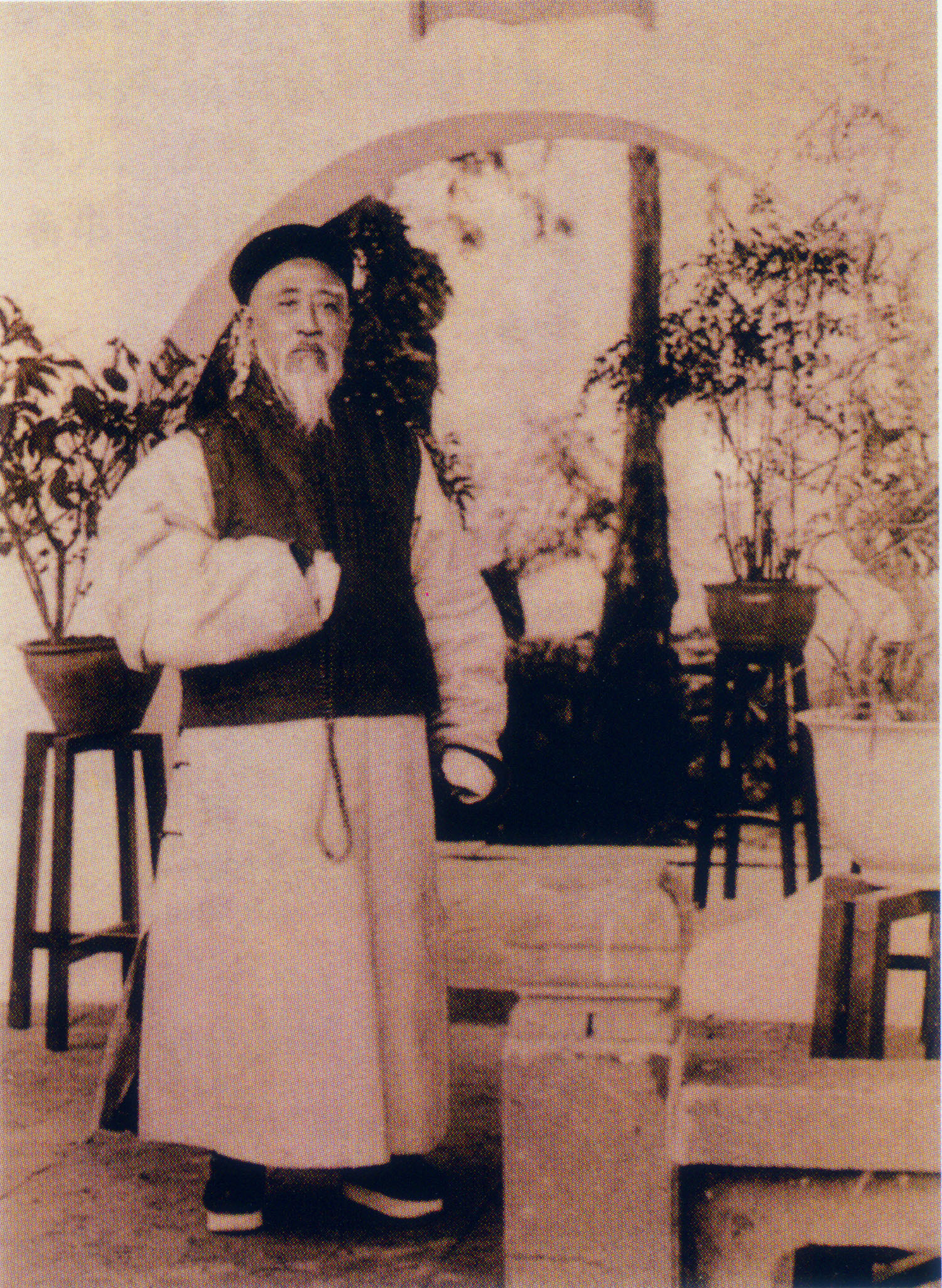
Chonghou, the Qing negotiator of the treaty

At the time of negotiations, China was in a strong position. Zuo's army was still in the region and far outnumbered the Russian troops that remained. Furthermore, Russia had recently concluded the Russo-Turkish War and the resulting Treaty of Berlin had not been particularly favorable to them. Military expenditures during that war had also drained the national treasury, so the fact that the terms of Livadia were so heavily in their favor came as quite a shock among government officials when they became widely known.

The Qing court laid the blame on the chief negotiator, Chonghou, who was described as being inexperienced and over-eager to return home. Upon his return to Beijing in January 1880, he was denounced as a traitor, stripped of his rank and office, and imprisoned. The government decided it needed to save face and following the Chinese proverb "kill the chicken to scare the monkey", ordered his execution. Zhang Zhidong stated that "The Russians must be considered extremely covetous and truculent in making the demands and Chonghou was extremely stupid and absurd in accepting them ... If we insist on changing the treaty, there may not be trouble; if we do not, we are unworthy to be called a state." Additionally, the government declared it would refuse to ratify the treaty and pressed Russia to reopen negotiations. Naturally, Russia wanted to keep the treaty terms, but their only options were to risk another war in Xinjiang, which they were ill-prepared to fight, or agree to China's request. Russia understood that the Great Powers would not ignore an attempt to enforce an unratified treaty and had even kept the conditions a secret, fearing that European powers would intervene on China's behalf if the terms became known. Given their financial situation and the fact that Ili was not crucial to Russian security, they agreed to discuss a new treaty, but on one condition: that Chonghou was pardoned and his life was spared.

As the months passed, tensions between the two countries remained high and both sides prepared for war. China dispatched Zeng Jize as their new negotiator. The foreign emissaries in Beijing pleaded on behalf of Chonghou, and even Queen Victoria personally interceded. Finally, on 12 August 1880, it was announced that Chonghou would be freed, and negotiations resumed. The resulting Treaty of Saint Petersburg kept many of the same provisions as the Treaty of Livadia, with the major exceptions being that Russia would return almost all of Xinjiang, less a small area reserved for Dungans who wanted to become Russian citizens, and that the amount of the indemnity payment increased.

== Analysis ==
For many years, the story that Chonghou was solely responsible for the debacle was perpetuated by the Chinese government, and this was the view put forth by historians as well. Although Chonghou had survived, he was turned into a nonperson by the government; he was expunged from government records and his letters were not published posthumously, as was the custom for Chinese court officials. Furthermore, neither the Chinese nor Russian governments retained any documents from the negotiations, thus making it difficult to determine how China ended up with an unequal treaty despite being in the better negotiating position.

Historian S. C. M. Paine investigated the circumstances around the treaty and discovered that contrary to the official story, Chonghou was an experienced diplomat and had a career of over thirty years in negotiations with France, Britain, and the United States. In fact, he led the delegation to France to offer the Chinese apology after the Tianjin Massacre in 1870.

Instead, Paine believes blame should be laid on the Qing government as a whole. At the Zongli Yamen (Ministry of Foreign Affairs), Prince Gong, who had founded the ministry, had plenty of experience dealing with Russia during negotiations for the Convention of Peking in 1860, and during the Russian occupation period, there was plenty of communication between the two countries that Russian territorial and commercial demands should have been known long before negotiations started. However, despite its charter, the Zongli Yamen was not the only agency that dealt with foreign affairs. Even within the ministry, there was a split between those who were open to foreigners (such as Prince Gong) and those who were not.

Paine argues that given Chonghou's experience, because the terms were so unfavourable to China, it is unlikely that he would have made those concessions on his own, as evidenced from the subsequent outrage. It was only when Empress Dowager Cixi sought comment on the treaty from others that it turned into a scandal. Cixi's installation of her nephew as emperor also created a power struggle in the government between her and Prince Gong, whose son was also in contention to succeed the Tongzhi Emperor. Thus, Prince Gong might have been distracted and unable to apply his foreign affairs expertise. In addition, Wenxiang, another diplomat who was also experienced in negotiating with Westerners, had died in 1876.

In short, Paine believes that Chonghou was poorly advised by the Zongli Yamen and when the court became outraged by the treaty, he became the scapegoat, otherwise the ministry and by extension Manchus (who made up the majority of Zongli Yamen officials) would have to take the blame.
