= Chonghou =

Chinese diplomat (1826–1893)

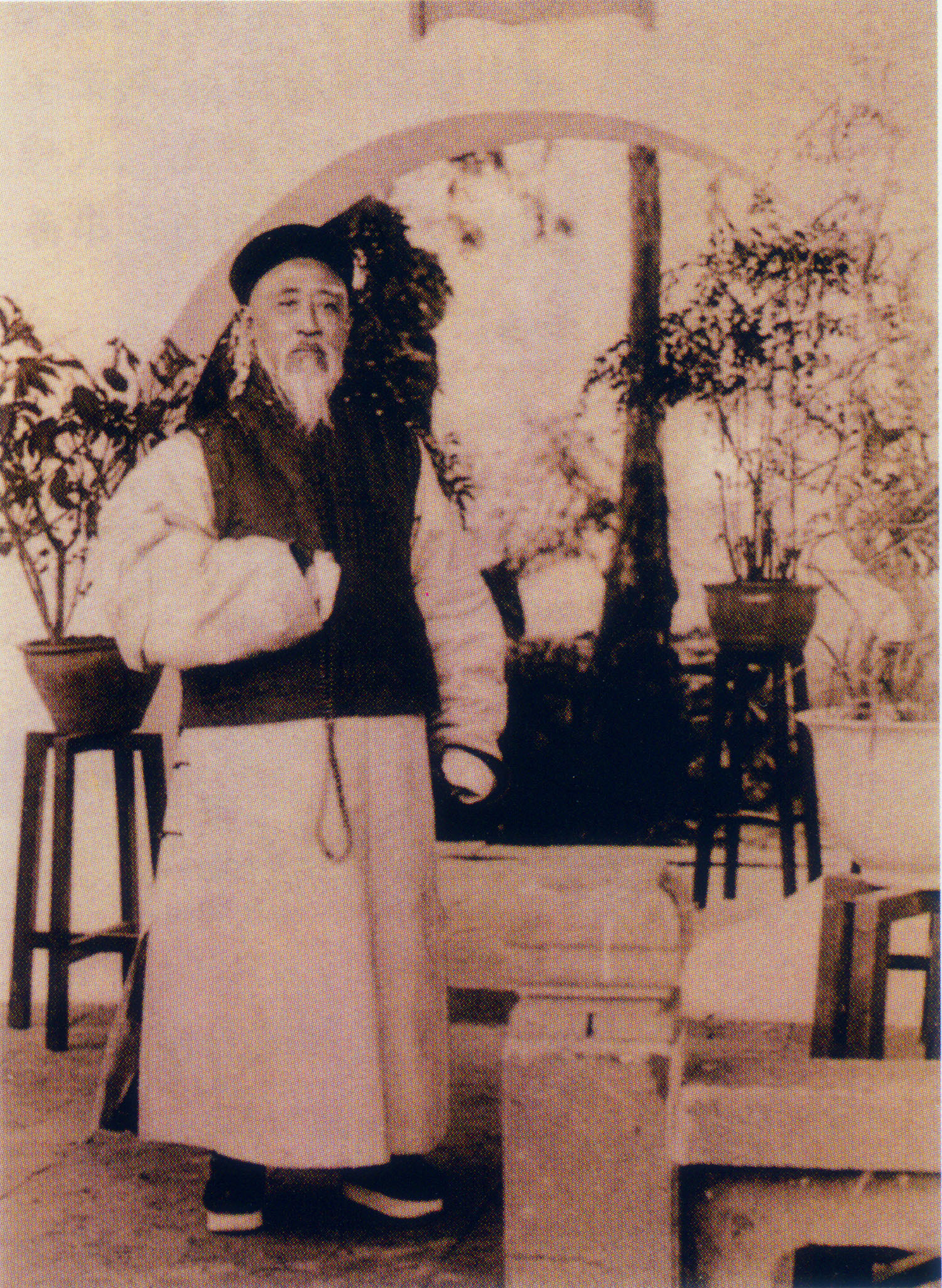
- Chonghou

General of Mukden
- In office 8 December 1876 – 22 June 1878 (acting)
- Preceded by: Chongshi (acting)
- Succeeded by: Qiyuan

Minister of Zongli Yamen
- In office 5 March 1872 – 8 December 1876

Viceroy of Zhili
- In office 14 February – 20 April 1863
- Preceded by: Wenyu
- Succeeded by: Liu Changyou

Minister of Court of Judicature and Revision
- In office 11 October 1861 – 19 January 1862 Serving with Zheng Dunjin
- Preceded by: Yikang
- Succeeded by: Akdunbu

Personal details
- Born: 7 October 1826
- Died: 26 March 1893 (aged 66)
- Occupation: Official and diplomat

Chonghou
- Chinese: 崇厚
Transcriptions
Standard Mandarin
- Hanyu Pinyin: Chónghòu
- Wade–Giles: Ch'ung^{2}-hou^{4}
- IPA: [ʈʂʰʊ̌ŋxôʊ]

Chonghou (Note: Also romanized as "Ch'ung-hou", "Chong-hou", "Chung How", "Chung Hao", or variations thereof; pronounced [ʈʂʰʊ̌ŋxôʊ]) (Chinese: 崇厚; pinyin: Chónghòu; Wade–Giles: Ch'ung-hou, 7 October 1826 – 26 March 1893), courtesy name Dishan (地山), art names Ziqian (子謙) and Hecha (鶴槎), was an official and diplomat of the Qing dynasty. He was a member of the Wanyan clan, descended from the Emperor Shizong of Jin.

== Early life and career ==
He was the second son of Linqing (麟慶) of the Jurchen Wanyan clan, and is thus said to have been a lineal descendant of the imperial clan of the Jin dynasty of the 12th and 13th centuries. Graduating as juren in 1849, he became a department magistrate in Gansu province in 1851. His brother Chongshi contributed 10,000 taels to the government for military expenses, and as a result, Chonghou was named as a prefect in Henan province. In 1853, the Xianfeng Emperor appointed him to the army to aid in suppressing the Taiping Rebellion. Following that, he served in various posts in Zhili for several years, including as a Taotai in 1858. He assisted Prince Gong during the negotiations of the Convention of Peking (1860), and the prince made him Superintendent of Trade in 1861 for the three northern treaty ports of Tianjin (where he was stationed), Yantai, and Yingkou. During this time, Chonghou negotiated with Denmark, the Netherlands, Spain, Belgium, and Austria.

== Tianjin Massacre ==
He was occupying this post when the Tianjin Massacre occurred on 21 June 1870. Several Chinese people were arrested for kidnapping children and selling them to Catholic orphanages. There were rumors that the orphanages were extracting the children's hearts and eyes for magical purposes, and anti-Catholic elements rioted against the missionaries. The French consul, Henri-Victor Fontanier, was to meet with Chonghou to discuss options, but Fontanier lost his temper and killed a Chinese official. Fontanier and his assistant were then killed by a mob. After the riot was quelled, Chonghou was sent to France with a letter of apology, which he was to be given to Adolphe Thiers, making him the first Chinese official to visit the West since those who accompanied Anson Burlingame to the United States in 1868. Thiers, however was preoccupied with the Franco-Prussian War and was unable to meet with him. He then spent time in London and New York, before returning to France to finally deliver the apology in November 1871.

On his return in 1872 he was appointed Vice President of the Board of War and made a member of the Zongli Yamen (Ministry of Foreign Affairs). In 1874 he was Vice President of the Board of Revenue, and in 1876 he was sent as acting General of Shengyang, replacing his brother, who had died that year. In 1878 he proceeded as Ambassador to Russia, and sent to Saint Petersburg to negotiate a treaty after the Qing reconquest of Xinjiang.

== Treaty of Livadia ==
The resulting Treaty of Livadia turned out to be very unfavorable to China: a large portion of Ili was to be ceded to Russia, Russia would have unprecedented access to trade routes in the interior of China, and China would pay an indemnity of five million rubles. When the terms became known among Chinese government officials, there was an uproar and Chonghou was branded as a traitor.

Upon his return to China, he was arrested, stripped of his rank, and sentenced to death. He was denounced by Li Hongzhang and Zuo Zongtang, nominally for returning without authorization; and also by the then Censor Zhang Zhidong for having exceeded his powers. He was characterized variously as naive, too eager to return home, acting on his own, incompetent, and ignorant.

Chonghou himself described his reasoning as such:

Only because our military forces were exhausted, our treasury was short of money, our border defenses were also inadequate to rely on, and because I wanted to safeguard our national interests, I had no choice but to agree under pressure.

Zeng Jize replaced Chonghou, but Russia refused to renegotiate the treaty unless Chonghou was pardoned. After months of tension and appeals by foreign ambassadors and leaders, including Queen Victoria, and Zeng as well, the Qing government relented, and commuted his death sentence, but Chonghou still had to make a contribution of 300,000 taels to purchase his freedom. Zeng eventually negotiated the Treaty of Saint Petersburg, and Chonghou retired to private life. In 1885, he was allowed to present Empress Dowager Cixi greetings on her 50th birthday, and restored to a rank two levels lower than his original rank. He died in obscurity in 1893.

== Historical reputation ==
Historian S. C. M. Paine believes that given his prior experience in France and in negotiating trade agreements in Tianjin, it is very unlikely that Chonghou would have agreed to the terms of the treaty on his own. Instead, it is more likely that he was poorly advised by the Zongli Yamen. Russia had been in communication with the Qing government during its occupation of Xinjiang, so Russian demands should have been well-known long before Chonghou left for Saint Petersburg. During his voyage, he was also in frequent contact with the Zongli Yamen via mail and telegraph. Back in China, Prince Gong, who was the head of the ministry and who had years of experience dealing with foreigners, was involved in a power struggle with Cixi regarding who would replace the Tongzhi Emperor: her nephew or the prince's son. Another experienced diplomat, Wenxiang, had died a few years previously. Furthermore, the Zongli Yamen was only one of several agencies involved in international relations, and even within itself there was an ideological split between those who were open to foreigners and those who were more xenophobic. The power struggle meant the bureaucrats were unsure of which faction would be in charge and thus unwilling to do any more than their immediate responsibilities. In short, he was made into a scapegoat to cover for the shortcomings of the Zongli Yamen.

Paine acknowledges that much of that argument is speculation, as Chonghou was made into a nonperson. He was expunged from government records and his letters were not published posthumously, as was the custom for Chinese court officials. Furthermore, neither the Chinese nor Russian governments retained any documents from the negotiations, thus making it difficult to determine how China ended up with an unequal treaty despite being in the better negotiating position (the Russian army in Xinjiang was outnumbered and the Russian treasury was drained due to the Russo-Turkish War). But evidence remains in the writings of others such as Zuo that points to that explanation.
