= Stefano Li Side =

Chinese Roman Catholic bishop (1926–2019)

- Bishop of Tianjin
- Native name: 李思德
- Church: Catholic Church
- Diocese: Diocese of Tianjin
- In office: 15 June 1982 – 8 June 2019
- Predecessor: Jean de Vienne de Hautefeuille
- Successor: Joseph Shi Hongchen
- Opposed to: Paul Li De-pei (1982-1983)

Orders
- Ordination: 17 July 1955 by Francis Zhao Zhensheng
- Consecration: 15 June 1982 by Paul Liu Shuhe

Personal details
- Born: 3 October 1926 Zunhua, Zhili, Republic of China
- Died: 8 June 2019 (aged 92) Liang Zhuang Zi Village (in southern Jizhou district), Tianjin, China

Stefano Li Side (3 October 1926 – 8 June 2019) was a Chinese clandestine Roman Catholic bishop.

Li was born in China and was ordained to the priesthood in 1955. He served as clandestinely bishop of the Roman Catholic Diocese of Tianjin, China, from 8 August 1982 until his death in 2019.
