= Treaty of Saint Petersburg (1881) =

Treaty between Russia and Qing China

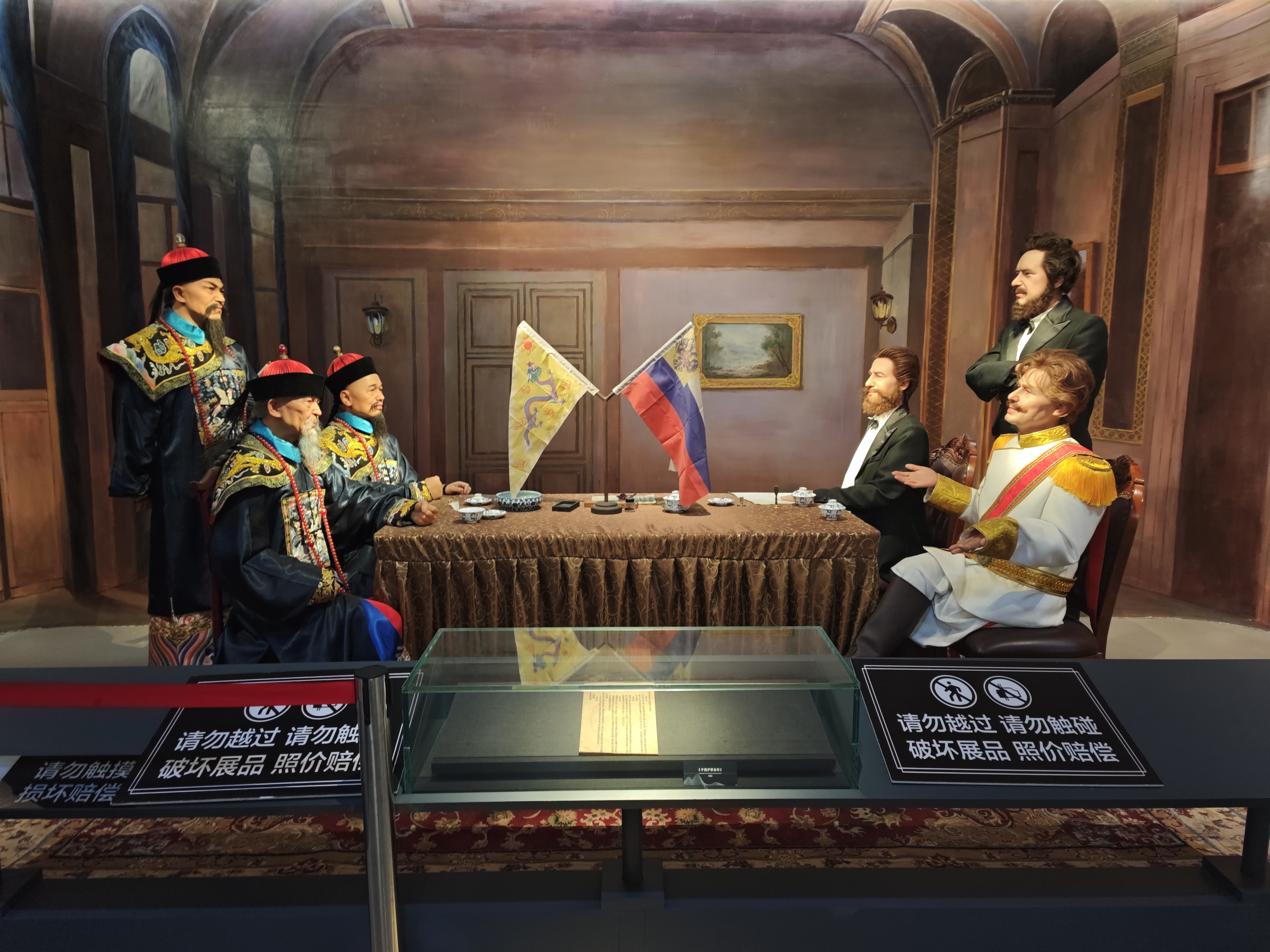
- The scene display of the Sino‑Russian negotiations & the replica of the Treaty at Khorgos Port, China.
- Type: Unequal treaty
- Signed: 24 February 1881
- Location: Saint Petersburg, Russia
- Signatories: (Qing dynasty) Zeng Jize; (Russian Empire) Nikolay Girs and Evgeny Butsov
- Parties: (Qing dynasty) China; (Russian Empire) Russia

Treaty of Saint Petersburg
- Traditional Chinese: 聖彼得堡條約
- Simplified Chinese: 圣彼得堡条约
Transcriptions
Standard Mandarin
- Hanyu Pinyin: Shèngbǐdébǎo Tiáoyuē
- Wade–Giles: Sheng4-pi3-te2-pao3 T'iao2-yüeh1

Treaty of Ili
- Traditional Chinese: 伊犁條約
- Simplified Chinese: 伊犁条约
Transcriptions
Standard Mandarin
- Hanyu Pinyin: Yīlí Tiáoyuē
- Wade–Giles: I1-li2 T'iao2-yüeh1

The Treaty of Saint Petersburg (Note: Russian: Петербургский договор, Chinese: 聖彼得堡條約) or Treaty of Ili (Note: Russian: Договор об Илийском крае, Chinese: 伊犁條約) was an unequal treaty between the Russian Empire and the Qing dynasty that was signed in Saint Petersburg, Russia, on 24 February [O.S. 12 February] 1881. It provided for the return to China of the eastern part of the Ili Basin region, also known as Zhetysu, which had been occupied by Russia since 1871 during the Dungan Revolt.

== Background ==
The Kulja territory is north of the Tien Shan and south of the Borohoro Mountains. It is the upper valley of the Ili River which flows into Lake Balkash.

During the Russian conquest of Turkestan, Russia gained control of eastern Kazakhstan up to the current Chinese border. During the Dungan Revolt, China lost control of much of its western territory, and power passed to various factions. In 1871, Russia occupied the Ili territory. There was talk of permanent annexation, but Saint Petersburg declared that it was occupying the territory to protect its citizens. Chinese authority in Xinjiang was re-established by 1877.

Chonghou was sent to Russia to negotiate. In September 1879, he concluded the Treaty of Livadia. Russia would retain the Tekes valley at the southwest end of the Ili Valley and passes over the mountains to the Tarim Basin. China would pay 5 million rubles, and various trade concessions were made. In January 1880 Chonghou returned to Peking and was greeted with indignation. He was declared to have betrayed his country and was arrested and then sentenced to death.

Zeng Jize was appointed as the new ambassador. Russia refused to negotiate unless Chonghou was released, and it was backed by the other powers. In August 1880 Chonghou was released, and negotiations resumed.

The Treaty of Saint Petersburg was concluded on 24 February [O.S. 12 February] 1881 and ratified within six months. Two years later (March 1883), Russia evacuated the province. There were some minor border problems, and a final protocol was signed on 31 October [O.S. 19 October] 1883.

Russia was represented by Nicholas de Giers, the head of the Asiatic Affairs Department of the Foreign Ministry (he would become Minister in 1882), and by Eugene Bützow, Russia's ambassador in China.

== Summary ==
According to Article 1, Russia agreed to return most of the occupied area to China. The Chinese government agreed in Article 2 to hold the residents of the area, regardless of their ethnicity and religion, harmless for their actions during the rebellion. The residents of the area would be allowed by Article 3 to stay or to move to Russia and would be asked about their choice before the withdrawal of the Russian troops.

Under Article 6, the Chinese government would pay Russia 9,000,000 "metal rubles" (Russian: металлических рублей; French: roubles métalliques; probably, silver roubles were meant) to serve as a payment for the occupation costs, as compensation for the claims of Russian subjects who lost their property during the rebellion, and as material assistance to the families of Russian subjects who were killed during the rebellion.

Article 7 set the new border in the Ili Valley. The area west of the border was retained by Russia "for the settlement of the region's residents who will choose to become Russian subjects and will have to leave the lands that they have owned" east of the new border.

The treaty also provided in Article 8 for minor adjustments of the border between the two countries in the area east of Lake Zaysan (now East Kazakhstan Province borders on the northern part of Xinjiang's Ili Kazakh Autonomous Prefecture).

Article 10 allowed Russia to expand its consular network in the northwestern parts of the Chinese Empire (Xinjiang, Gansu, and Outer Mongolia). Besides the consulates in Ili City (Kulja), Tarbagatai (Chuguchak, Tacheng), Kashgar and Urga (Ulaanbaatar) that had been provided for in earlier treaties (see Treaty of Kulja, 1851), Russia would open consulates in Suzhou (Jiuquan), and Turpan. In Kobdo (Khovd), Uliasutai (Uliastai), Hami (Kumul), Ürümqi, and Gucheng (Qitai), Russia would be allowed to establish consulates later, as would be required by the volume of trade.

Article 12 affirmed the right of duty-free trade for Russian traders in Mongolia and Xinjiang. The treaty also contained various provisions designed to facilitate activities of Russian merchants and to regulate bilateral trade. An appendix to the treaty specified the list of border crossings that both countries were to operate.

== Aftermath ==
The Treaty of Saint Petersburg was perceived as a huge loss and step backward by many in Russia, such as by Minister of War Dmitry Milyutin and the notable military commander Aleksei Brusilov.

Several thousand Dungan (Hui) and Taranchi (Uyghur) families made use of the treaty to move to Russian-controlled territory, today's south-eastern Kazakhstan and northern Kyrgyzstan. While some of them soon returned to China, most stayed in Russian domains, and their descendants have lived in Kazakhstan and Northern Kyrgyzstan ever since.

The border between the two empires set by Article 7 of the treaty remains the border between Kazakhstan and China.

Historians have judged the Qing dynasty's vulnerability to western imperialism in the 19th century as being due primarily to its naval weakness; centuries of deliberate isolation meant the Qing’s maritime forces were woefully outmatched against their European counterparts. In contrast, the Qing achieved some military success against westerners fighting on land. Historian Edward L. Dreyer stated, "China's nineteenth-century humiliations were strongly related to her weakness and failure at sea. At the start of the Opium War, China had no unified navy and no sense of how vulnerable she was to attack from the sea; British forces sailed and steamed wherever they wanted to go.... In the Arrow War (1856-60), the Chinese had no way to prevent the Anglo-French expedition of 1860 from sailing into the Gulf of Zhili and landing as near as possible to Beijing. Meanwhile, new if not exactly modern Chinese armies suppressed the midcentury rebellions, bluffed Russia into a peaceful settlement of disputed frontiers in Central Asia, and defeated the French forces on land in the Sino-French War (1884-85). But the defeat of the fleet, and the resulting threat to steamship traffic to Taiwan, forced China to conclude peace on unfavorable terms."

The Qing dynasty forced Russia to hand over disputed territory in the Treaty of Saint Petersburg (1881) in what was seen as a "diplomatic victory" against Russia. Russia acknowledged that Qing China potentially posed a serious military threat. Mass media in the West then portrayed China as a rising military power because of its modernization programs and as a major threat to the Western world. They even invoked fears that China would manage to conquer western colonies like Australia.

British observer Demetrius Charles de Kavanagh Boulger proposed an Anglo-Chinese alliance to check Russian expansionism in Central Asia.

During the Ili crisis, while Qing China threatened to go to war against Russia over the Russian occupation of Ili, British officer Charles George Gordon was sent to China by Britain to advise on its military options against Russia in a potential war.

The Russians observed that the Chinese were building up their arsenal of modern weapons during the Ili crisis, and the Chinese bought thousands of rifles from Germany. In 1880, massive amounts of military equipment and rifles were shipped via boats to China from Antwerp, as China purchased torpedoes, artillery, and 260,260 modern rifles from Europe.

Russian military observer D. V. Putiatia visited China in 1888 and found that in Northeastern China (Manchuria) along the Chinese-Russian border, the Chinese soldiers were potentially able to become adept at "European tactics" under certain circumstances and were armed with modern weapons like Krupp artillery, Winchester carbines, and Mauser rifles.

Compared to Russian-controlled areas, more benefits were given to the Muslim Kirghiz (Kazakhs) in the Chinese-controlled areas. Russian settlers fought against the Muslim nomadic Kirghiz, which led the Russians to believe that the Kirghiz would be a liability in any conflict against China. The Muslim Kirghiz were sure that in a war, China would defeat Russia.

Russian sinologists, the Russian media, the threat of internal rebellion, the pariah status inflicted by the Congress of Berlin, and the negative state of the Russian economy all led Russia to concede and to negotiate with China in Saint Petersburg and to return most of Ili to China.

== Pamirs ==
According to Chatham House sources, the Tajikistan part of Pamirs were more or less transferred during this treaty, and incorporated into what is now Tajikistan, with remaining parts such as Taxkorgan valley staying in Chinese hands.

== See also ==
- Xinjiang under Qing rule
