= Melchior Shi Hongzhen =

Chinese Roman Catholic bishop (born 1927)

Most Reverend Melchior Shi Hongzhen
- Bishop of Tianjin
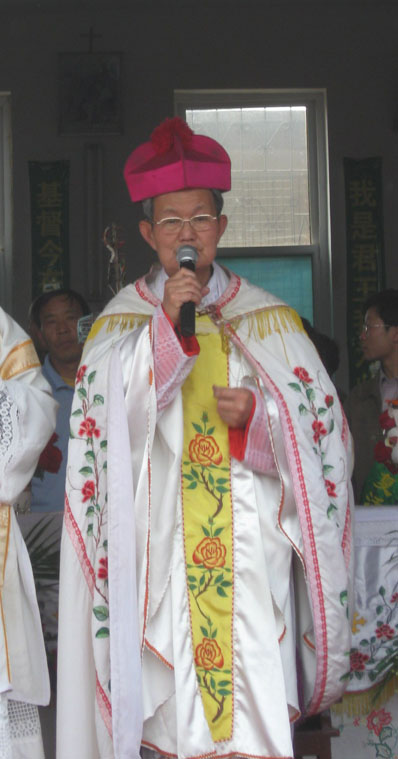
- Native name: 石鴻禎
- Church: Catholic Church
- Diocese: Tianjin
- In office: 8 June 2019
- Predecessor: Paul Liu Shuhe

Orders
- Ordination: 4 July 1954
- Consecration: 15 June 1982 by Bishop Paul Liu Shuhe

Personal details
- Born: 7 January 1929 (age 97) Tianjin, China
- Residence: House arrest
- Motto: 温良和愛德該照耀我的一切工作
- Coat of arms

Melchior Shi Hongzhen (born 7 January 1929) is a Chinese Catholic prelate who has served as Bishop of Tianjin since 2019. He had been under house arrest after refusing to join Chinese Patriotic Catholic Association. The government recognized him as bishop of Tianjin in 2024.

== Biography ==
Hongzhen was born in Tianjin, China, on 7 January 1929. He was ordained a priest on 4 July 1954. He was consecrated on 15 June 1982 by Bishop Paul Liu Shuhe as Coadjutor Bishop of Tianjin.

After the death of Liu Shuhe on 8 June 2019, Hongzhen succeeded him as Bishop of Tianjin but he was not recognised by the Chinese authorities because he refused to join the Chinese Patriotic Catholic Association (CPCA). He was then placed under house arrest by the Chinese government. He was recognized by the government as bishop in 2024.
