= Charity Mansion =

Church building in People's Republic of China

Charity Mansion （仁慈堂）is a Roman Catholic chapel located in Tianjin, China, which was the former mission site of the local branch of the Daughters of Charity of St Vincent de Paul.

== History ==
In 1862, Beijing missionary bishop Joseph-Martial Mouly brought 14 nuns of the Daughters of Charity from Europe to China. Five of these nuns stayed in Tianjin and did charitable works, including providing medical help.

A church and other buildings (including an orphanage and a hospital) for use by the nuns were constructed from 1867 to 1868 at a location near the west side of the Haihe river.

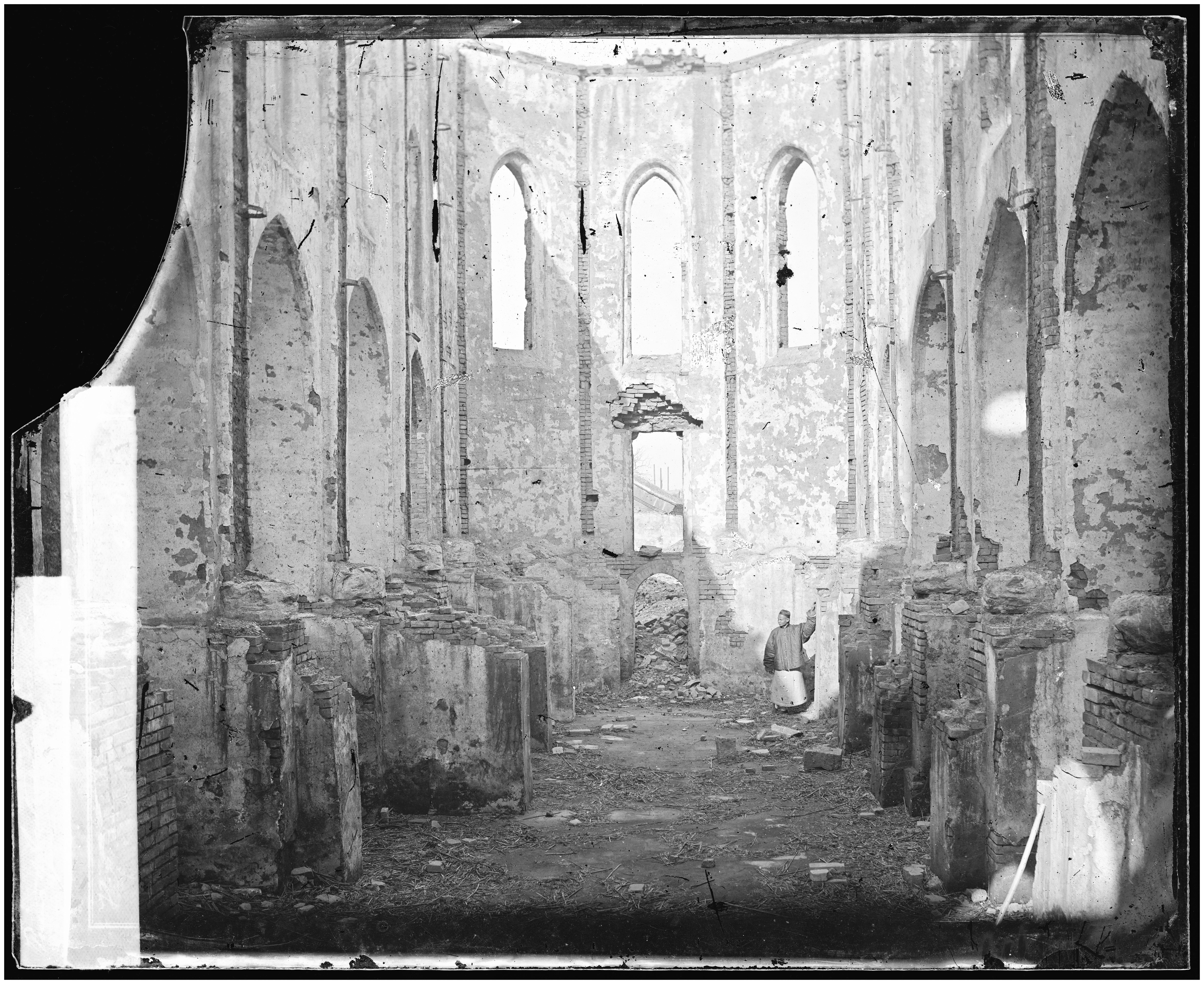
The first construction following its destruction in the Tianjin massacre of 1870

Rumours spread in Tianjin that the nuns were kidnapping and abusing children at the orphanage. In 1870, the Tianjin massacre occurred, wherein mobs of Chinese attacked several churches in Tianjin, including the mission site for the Daughters of Charity, which was destroyed. Ten nuns died in the attack.

The buildings were rebuilt following the destruction. However, the mission was destroyed again in 1900 during the Boxer Rebellion by the Boxers. It was rebuilt again at the same site in 1904. It was still used as an orphanage and a church by the nuns.

At the time of the communist takeover of China in 1949, the orphanage had 471 orphans being taken care of by the nuns. In 1950, the new communist government expelled all foreign missionaries from China including the missionary nuns. The orphanage subsequently closed as a result. The site was taken over by the government and its buildings were repurposed for a government-run children's home and a handkerchief factory.

In 2009, several Daughters of Charity nuns in Tianjin went on a hunger strike in protest of plans to demolish the site entirely to facilitate new construction development. The hunger strike ended with several nuns being hospitalized. The diocese made a deal with the municipal government, and the site was demolished in 2010, but a new church was opened near the site and opened for worship in 2011. The subway company allegedly failed to pay a promised compensation to the nuns for the demolition and they staged a protest when they claimed that the religious affairs bureau failed to help them.

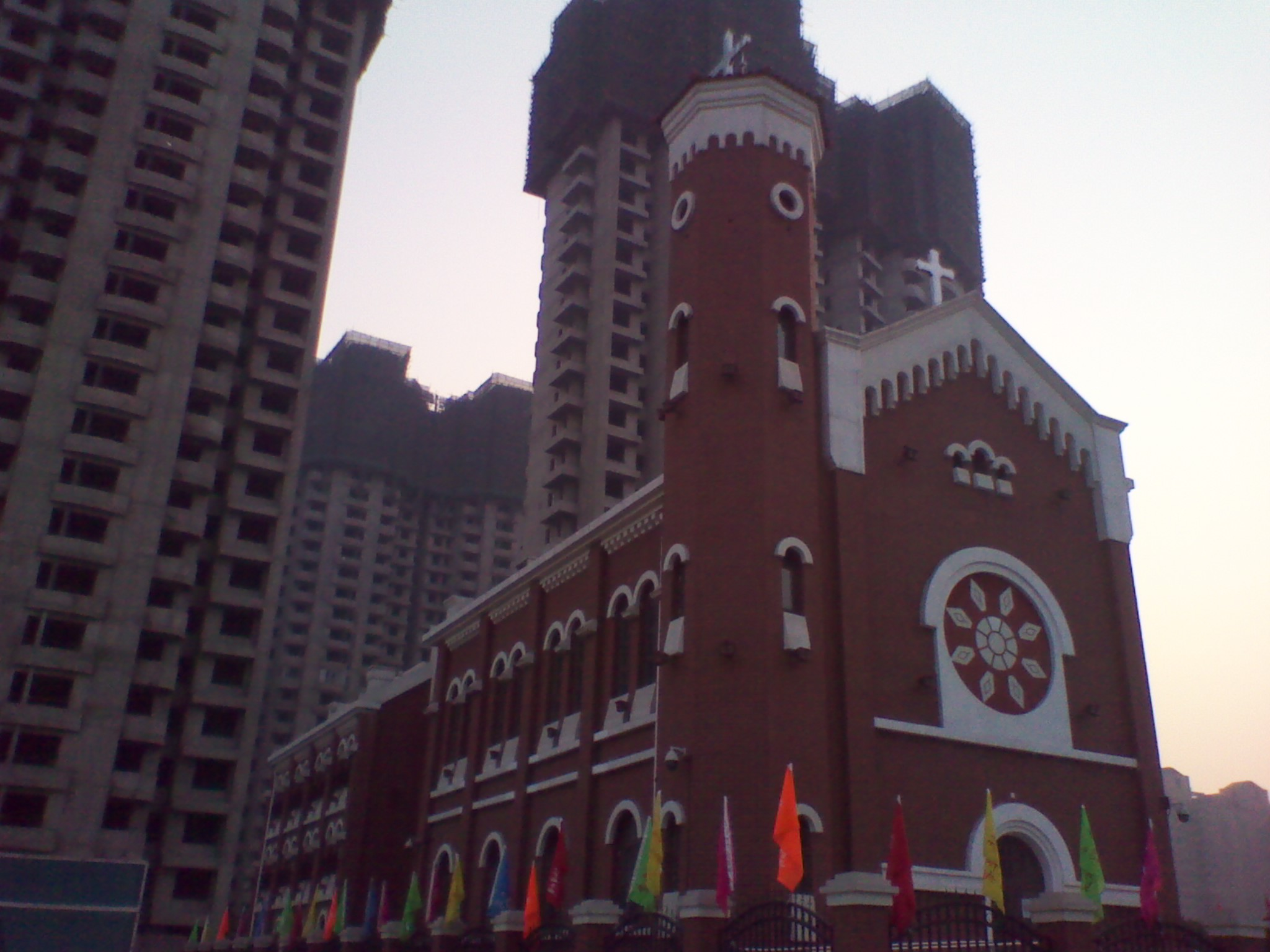
the previous orphanage and church that were demolished in 2010

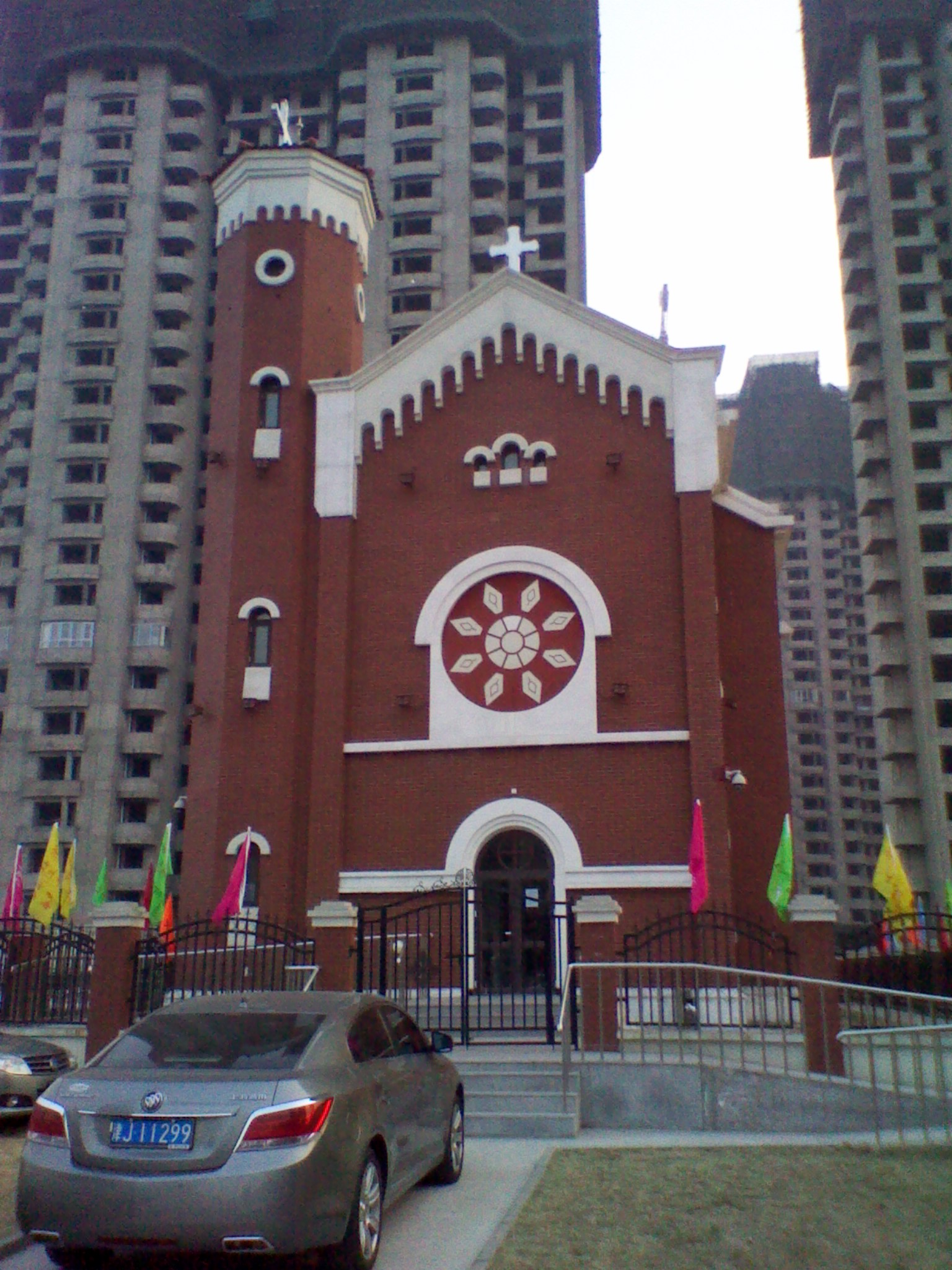
front side
