= Zeng Jize =

Qing ambassador and diplomat (1839–1890)

Marquis Zeng Jize
- 曾紀澤
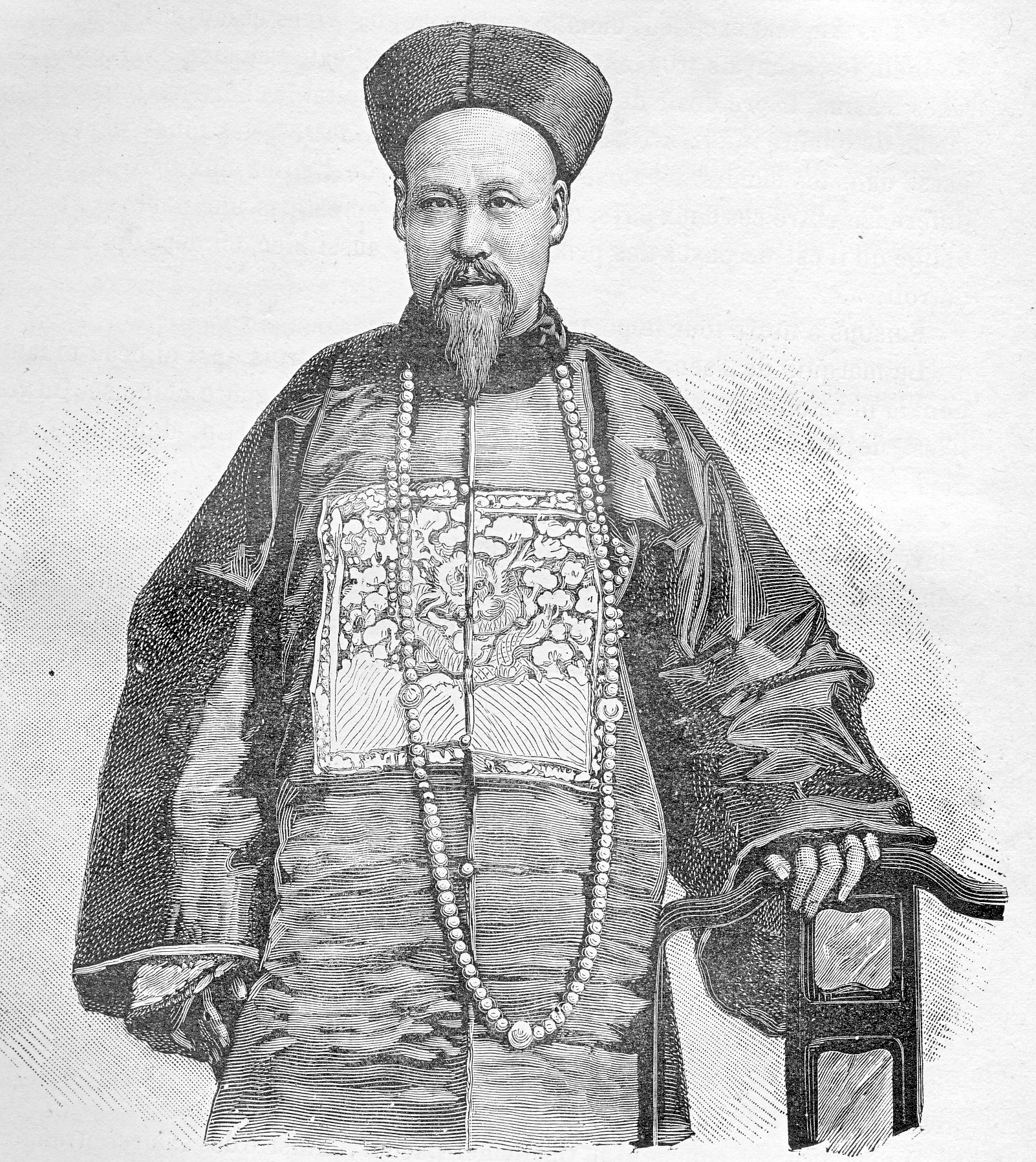

3rd Chinese Ambassador to Russia
- In office 12 February 1880 – 17 August 1886
- Monarch: Guangxu
- Preceded by: Shao Youyu
- Succeeded by: Liu Ruifen

2nd Chinese Ambassador to the UK
- In office 25 August 1878 – 27 July 1885
- Monarch: Guangxu
- Preceded by: Guo Songtao
- Succeeded by: Liu Ruifen

2nd Chinese Ambassador to France
- In office 25 August 1878 – 28 April 1884
- Monarch: Guangxu
- Preceded by: Guo Songtao
- Succeeded by: Xu Jingcheng

Personal details
- Born: 7 December 1839
- Died: 12 April 1890 (aged 50)
- Parent: Zeng Guofan (father)
- Known for: Signed Treaty of Saint Petersburg (1881)
- Writing career
- Notable works: China, the Sleep and the Awakening

Zeng Jize
- Traditional Chinese: 曾紀澤
- Simplified Chinese: 曾纪泽
Transcriptions
Standard Mandarin
- Hanyu Pinyin: Zēng Jìzé
- Wade–Giles: Tseng1 Chi4-tse2

Marquis Zeng Jize (7 December 1839 – 12 April 1890; traditional Chinese: 曾紀澤; simplified Chinese: 曾纪泽, Zēng Jìzé), also formerly romanized Tseng Chi-tse, was a Chinese diplomat. As one of China's earliest ministers to London, Paris and Saint Petersburg, he played an important role in the diplomacy that preceded and accompanied the Sino-French War. He pioneered the use of telegrams for diplomatic correspondence between Qing legations and its foreign ministry, the Zongli Yamen. His 1887 profile, "China: the Sleep, and the Awakening", was widely noticed in the West.

== Early career ==
Zeng Jize (1839–90), a native of Hunan province, was the eldest son of Zeng Guofan (曾國藩), a leading reformist minister at the Qing court, who was a descendants of Zengzi. Zeng had inherited his father's title of Marquis in 1877. He received a traditional Chinese education, but was also one of the few Chinese officials who learned English and took an interest in European affairs. With these advantages he was persuaded to represent China's interests abroad as a diplomat.

== Marquis Zeng's diplomacy ==
Zeng was appointed minister to Britain, France and Russia in 1878, and lived in Europe for seven years (1879–1885). He made his name as a diplomat in 1880 and 1881, by renegotiating the infamous 1879 Treaty of Livadia with Russia. The resulting Treaty of Saint Petersburg (February 1881), which reversed most of the Russian gains of 1879, was generally considered a diplomatic triumph for China.

Zeng's duties as minister to Paris were dominated by the confrontation between France and China over Tonkin that eventually culminated in the Sino-French War. Zeng's denunciations of French policy in Tonkin began softly enough in April 1882 after the capture of the citadel of Hanoi by Henri Rivière, grew more insistent as French ambitions became clearer in the summer of 1883, and reached a climax immediately after the Sơn Tây Campaign in December 1883.

In July 1883 Zeng's optimistic assessment that the French government had no stomach for a full-scale war with China influenced the Qing government's decision to terminate the Shanghai negotiations between Li Hongzhang and Arthur Tricou over the future of Tonkin. The failure of the Shanghai negotiations stiffened France's resolve to confront the Black Flag Army to entrench its protectorate in Tonkin, and arguably made war between France and China inevitable.

In August 1883, during a series of discussions in Paris with the French foreign minister Paul-Armand Challemel-Lacour, Zeng used the good offices of the American chargé d'affaires E. J. Brulatour to convey Chinese proposals to the French, in an attempt to give the impression that the United States was more closely associated with China's diplomatic position on Tonkin than it really was. The manoeuvre was easily detected, and irritated both the French and the Americans.

In January 1884, in the wake of Admiral Amédée Courbet's capture of Sơn Tây (16 December 1883), Zeng wrote a provocative article that made wounding references to the Franco-Prussian War ('The bravery of the French soldiers has been so widely praised that one might almost think that they had captured Metz or Strasbourg rather than Sơn Tây'). To add insult to injury, he arranged for this article to be published in Germany, in the Breslau Gazette.

This and earlier provocations goaded the French government into demanding his replacement in April 1884. The Qing court, dismayed by the rout of China's Guangxi Army in the Bắc Ninh Campaign (March 1884), complied with this demand on 28 April, paving the way for the conclusion of the Tientsin Accord between France and China in May 1884. Xu Jingcheng (許景澄), an emollient career diplomat, was appointed China's minister-general to France, Germany, Austria and Italy, and Zeng was simultaneously relieved of his position as minister to France, ostensibly to allow him to devote more time to his duties as minister to Britain and Russia. Pending Xu's arrival from China (he set sail in September 1884 and only arrived in Europe in early 1885), the Chinese minister to Germany Li Fengbao (李鳳苞) was appointed interim minister to France.
