= French concession of Tianjin =

Foreign concession in China

The French concession in green Other concessions in light green

The French concession in Tianjin (French:Concession française de Tientsin,Chinese:天津法租界) was an exclusive concession established by the Second French Empire in Tianjin in June 1861. It was one of the four French concessions in China during the modern era. Its establishment was closely related to the signing of the Treaty of Tientsin (1858) and the Convention of Peking (1860), which marked the formal entry of French influence into Tianjin.

The French concession in Tianjin was not only the second concession demarcated among the nine foreign concessions but also one of the most prosperous. Its establishment granted France independent administrative, judicial, and police authority in Tianjin, with a French consul presiding over a municipal council and a supporting police station, thereby creating an urban governance system with strong semi-colonial characteristics.

On the cultural and social level, the concession witnessed numerous historical events and disputes, such as the Tianjin Massacre.It attracted French missionaries, merchants, and diplomats, serving both as a center of religious and cultural exchange and as a focal point of frequent conflicts. The French also built multiple religious and public structures in the area, the most representative being St. Joseph's Cathedral (Xikai Church).

The Laoxikai Affair arose in 1915-1916 as political and diplomatic dispute between France and the Republic of China. It developed out of an attempt by the French consulate to expand France's extraterritorial power in Tianjin outside of the French concession and into the adjacent Laoxikai district where a Catholic Cathedral had recently been built. The French built a road from the French concession to the consulate, installed posts along the road bearing the French tricolor, and imposed taxes on Chinese homes and businesses along the road. Chinese residents protested the imposition of French authority, forming organizations to organize strikes, boycotts of French goods and the use of French currency, and for the Chinese government to take diplomatic steps. The dispute rose from the local to national levels, and the Chinese and French governments failed to initially resolve it.On 20 October 1916, French police arrested nine Chinese police officers. Chinese residents in Tianjin responded by rioting. The Chinese government protested the arrests, and the French released the Chinese police officers and issued an apology.

The French concession contained a dense concentration of public buildings and was home to vibrant commercial and financial activity. Landmarks such as the Tianjin Quanye Bazaar, along with various banks, hotels, and clubs, were clustered in this district, making it one of Tianjin's modern commercial hubs. Due to its proximity to the British concession in Tianjin, both concessions, located in the Zizhulin area, were also referred to as the “Zizhulin Concessions.”

From its establishment in 1861 until its gradual recovery by China in the 1940s, the French concession in Tianjin lasted for more than eighty years. During this period, it served as an important French stronghold in North China and exerted a lasting influence on Tianjin's urban structure and modernization.

France relinquishing its colonial claims in China in 1946.

== See also ==
- Foreign concessions in Tianjin
- Foreign concessions in China
- Map of concessions in Tianjin (in Chinese)
