= Diocese of Tianjin =

Catholic diocese in China

Coordinates: 39.1333°N 117.1830°E

Diocese of Tianjin Dioecesis Tienzinensis 天主教天津教区
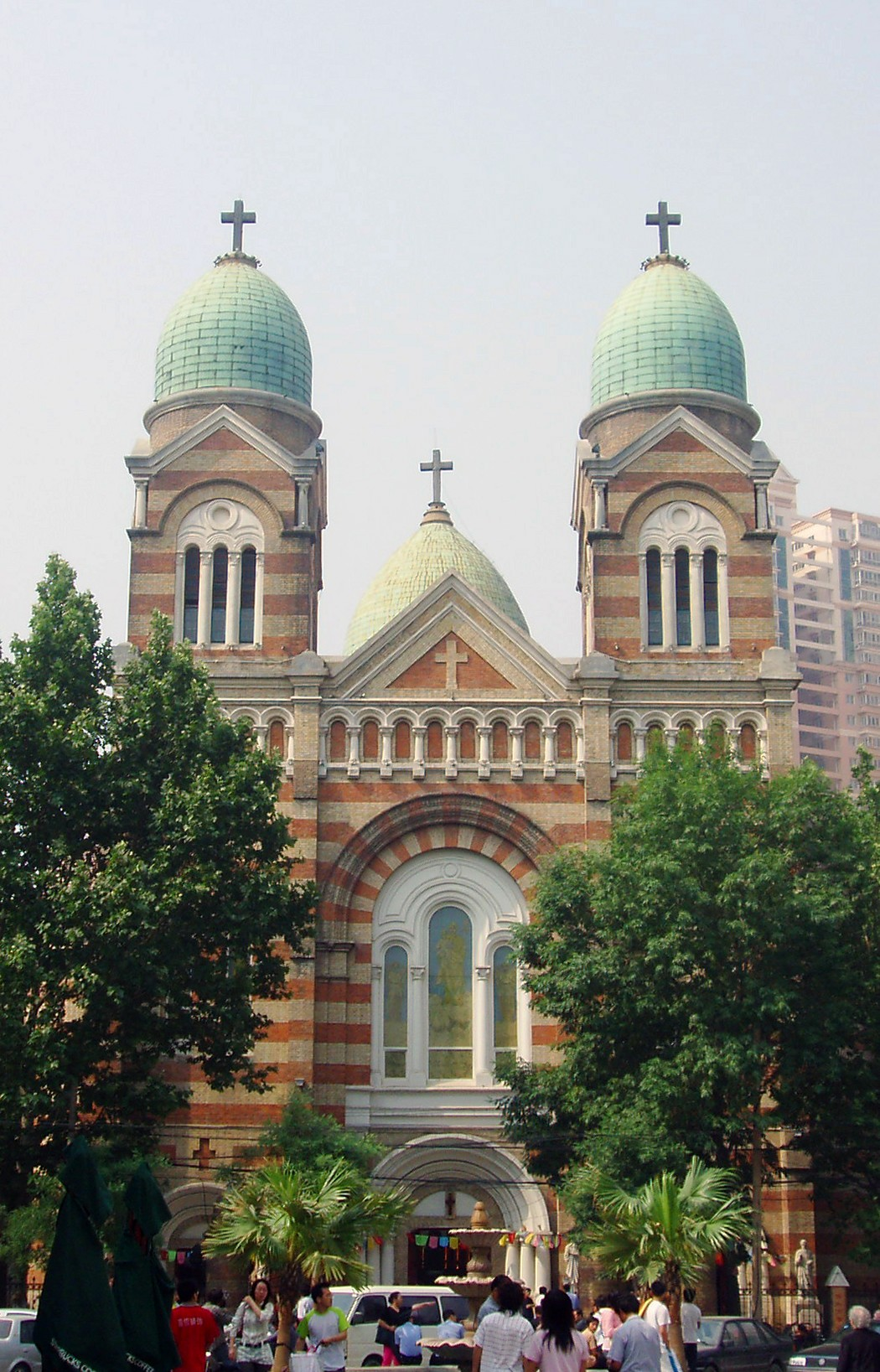
- The façade of St Joseph's Catholic Church

Location
- Country: China
- Ecclesiastical province: Beijing
- Metropolitan: Beijing

Statistics
- Area: 12,560 km^{2} (4,850 sq mi)
- Population: Total; Catholics: (as of 2008); 15,000,000; 100,000(60,000 est. underground faithful, as of 2008) (0.7%)

Information
- Denomination: Catholic
- Sui iuris church: Latin Church
- Rite: Roman Rite
- Cathedral: St. Joseph’s Cathedral

Current leadership
- Pope: Leo XIV
- Bishop: Melchior Shi Hongzhen
- Metropolitan Archbishop: Joseph Li Shan

The Diocese of Tianjin/Tíentsín (Latin: Tienzinen(sis), Chinese: 天津; pinyin: Tiānjīn) is a suffragan diocese in the ecclesiastical province of the Metropolitan Archdiocese of Beijing in China.

Its cathedral episcopal see is Cathedral of St. Joseph (Laoxikai Church), in the city of Tianjin, which also houses the former cathedral Our Lady of Victory Church (Wanghailou Church) (圣母得勝堂（望海樓天主堂)).

Data from 1950 indicated there were 50,000 registered Catholics in Tianjin, about 1.4% of the total 3,600,000 population. Data from 2008 estimated 100,000 Catholics in Tianjin after years of persecution, of which 40,000 are officially registered and an estimated 60,000 are underground. This represents about 0.7% of the population of Tianjin.

== History ==
- June 19, 1870: the Tianjin Massacre, an anti-Catholic riot, occurred in the city of Tianjin
- April 27, 1912: The Apostolic Vicariate of Coastal Chi-Li (直隸海濱) was established on territory split off from the Apostolic Vicariate of Northern Chi-Li (直隸北境)
- December 3, 1924: Renamed after its see as Apostolic Vicariate of Tianjin (天津)
- April 11, 1946: Promoted as Diocese of Tianjin (天津)

== Ordinaries ==
Apostolic Vicars of Coastal Chi-Li (直隸海濱)

- Paul-Marie Dumond, Lazarists (C.M.) (April 27, 1912 – July 21, 1920), Titular Bishop of Curubis (1912.05.02 – 1944.02.19), later Apostolic Administrator of Ganzhou 贛州 (China) (1920.07.21 – 1925.05.12) becoming Apostolic Vicar of Ganzhou (1925.05.12 – 1931.07.03), Apostolic Vicar of Nanchang 南昌 (China) (1931.07.03 – death 1944.02.19)

Apostolic Vicar of Tianjin (天津)

- Jean de Vienne de Hautefeuille, C.M. (文貴斌) (July 12, 1923 – April 11, 1946), Titular Bishop of Abrittum (1915.08.10 – 1946.04.11 see below); previously Coadjutor Apostolic Vicar of Southwestern Chi-Li 直隸西南 (China) (1915.08.10 – 1917.04.02), succeeding as Vicar Apostolic of Southwestern Chi-Li (1917.04.02 – 1919.04.02), Coadjutor Vicar Apostolic of Northern Chi-Li 直隸北境 (China) (1919.04.02 – 1923.07.12)

Bishops of Tianjin (天津)

- Jean de Vienne de Hautefeuille, C.M. (文貴斌) (see above April 11, 1946 – 1951), later Titular Bishop of Abora (1951.06.14 – 1957.09.21)
- Apostolic Administrator John Zhang Bi-de (張弼德) (1951 – February 13, 1953), while Bishop of Zhaoxian 趙縣 (China) (1946.04.11 – 1953.02.13)
- Apostolic Administrator Fr. Alphonsus Zhao, C.M. (趙) (February 13, 1953 – 1981)
- Uncanonical Li De-pei (李德培) (1958 – 1991.07.13), without papal mandate
- Stefano Li Side (1982 clandestine consecration – 2019.06.08), under house arrest at Ji County for refusing to join the Patriotic Catholic Association
- Melchior Shi Hongzhen (since 2019.06.08), recognised by CPCA since 2024

== Sources and external links ==
- GCatholic.org, with incumbent biography links
- Catholic Hierarchy
- Diocese website (Chinese)
