= St. Joseph Cathedral (Tianjin) =

Roman Catholic church in China

Coordinates: 39°07′01″N 117°11′15″E

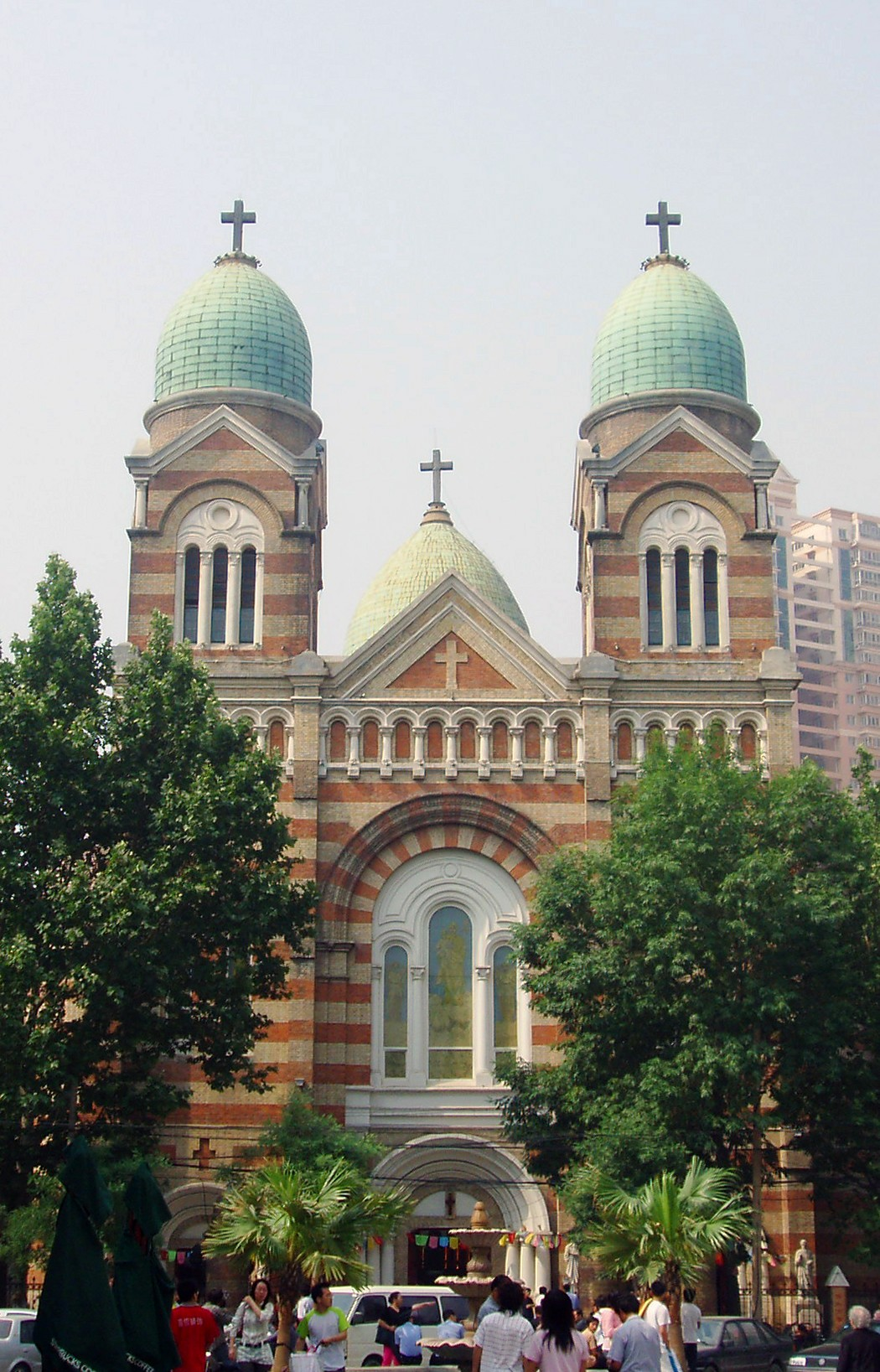
- Façade of St. Joseph's Cathedral

Religion
- Affiliation: Roman Catholic
- District: Roman Catholic Diocese of Tianjin
- Region: Hebei Province of China
- Status: Active

Location
- Location: Xining Road, Heping District, Tianjin, China
- Interactive map of St. Joseph Cathedral

Architecture
- Type: Church
- Style: Neo-Byzantine architecture
- Groundbreaking: 1913
- Completed: 1916

Specifications
- Direction of façade: Northeast
- Capacity: 1,500 people
- Interior area: 1,891.95 m^{2} (20,364.8 sq ft)

Website
- www.tj-church.org

St. Joseph Cathedral (Chinese: 圣若瑟主教座堂; pinyin: Shèng Ruòsè Zhǔjiào Zuòtáng), also known as the Xikai Church (Chinese: 西開堂; pinyin: Xikāi Táng), is a Roman Catholic church located in the central commercial district and former French concession of Tianjin, China. It is at the southern end of Binjiang Dao (滨江道) in Heping District. The cathedral is one of Tianjin's protected historical relics. The church was built in 1913 and was completed in 1916, under the name of MG Church before it was renamed St. Joseph's Church. It is the largest Roman Catholic Church in Tianjin and also a historical site.

== History ==
In 1912, the Holy See issued an edict, announced by the Zhili Vicariate on behalf of the Northern Territory Zhili Vicariate. Tianjin's Bishop House was located near the Hai River in the Wanghailou Church, and the first apostolic vicar was Paul-Marie Dumond of the Congregation of the Mission.

Construction began in August 1913. Each brick had to be shipped from France. In June 1916, Xikai was completed and became the main cathedral for the Roman Catholic Diocese of Tianjin. Afterward, Bishop Paul-Marie Dumond opened the St. Joseph's Primary School (now Tianjin No. 21 Middle School). The diocese later acquired the St. Joseph's School of Law and the Catholic Hospital (now Obstetrics and Gynecology Hospital of Tianjin).

At the start of construction, the French concession of Tianjin was ordered to station police in the area. On October 20, 1916, however, the French police were forced to disarm by local Chinese police, who held the bridge and caused massive public protests in Tianjin. Later, the Sino-French regained control. On August 23, 1966, Red Guards attacked the area and destroyed three towers, which were not rebuilt until the 1980s.

The 1976 Tangshan earthquake caused some damage to the cathedral. The two front shock towers at the base of the dome were severely damaged, and repairs to the base did not begin until 1979. They were completed in the fall of 1980, when the official opening was celebrated. In August 1991, Xikai was listed on Tianjin's cultural relics protection list. As of today, the church is still the largest Catholic church in the Tianjin metropolitan area.

== Architectural style ==
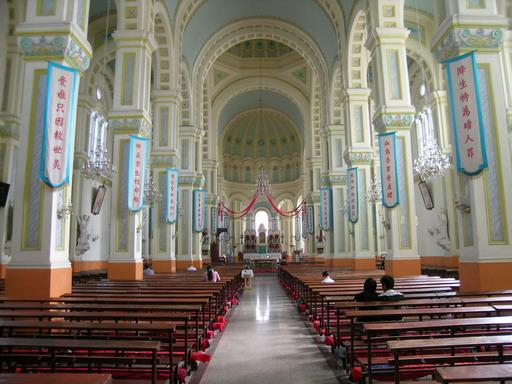
Inside Xikai Cathedral

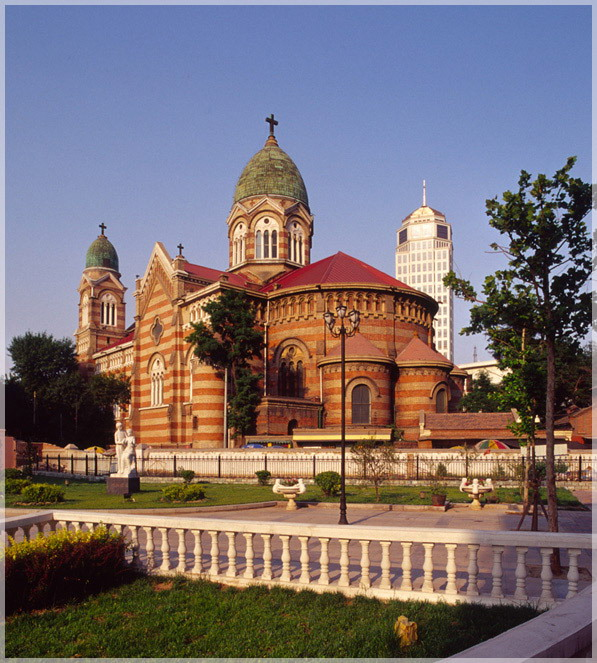
Xikai Cathedral profile

Xikai is northern China's largest Romanesque church, with an area of 1891.95 square meters and can accommodate 1,500 people. The giant dome has a "product" shape with a green copper surface on the outside, supported by a wood structure and topped with a bronze cross. At the time it was built, the bishop refused to install a lightning rod on the dome, but one was added 50 years later. However, 80 years later, when the area became a commercial center for Tianjin, the church was no longer the tallest building nearby and therefore no longer required a lightning rod. Xikai's walls are checkered with red and yellow tiles and framed with white water masonry. Circular windows, columns, large indoor paintings, a large pipe organ, and semi-circular windows accent the building. The entrance consists of two doors in the back of Xikai, originally meant to allow men and women to enter through separate doors.

The interior of Xikai is based on French and Roman architecture styles. The long main hall is lined by 14 large columns (two rows of seven), leading to a gallery-style tee. The nave has a stacked composite side portico, supported by semi-circular tops. The tall central dome consists of an octagonal drum roof that complements the octagonal windows throughout the church. Its side windows are stained glass with inlay painting. Painted, ornate murals, full of Biblical scenes, cover the walls.

== Religious activities ==
There are two Our Lady of China, Tianjin (OLCTJ) parishes that celebrate at this cathedral: Chinese and English.

Every morning the Chinese parish holds a Mass, while also providing additional Saturday and Sunday services.

The English speaking parish, started in 2007 by Joseph Loftus, celebrates at 11:30am every Sunday, with special Masses around certain holidays. Since this parish began, the English speaking foreign celebrants have created a council to run all of the parish activities including a music ministry, youth group, rosary group, potluck meals, a RCIA, and a charity ministry. More specifically, the Xikai English parish has developed partnerships to help with Tianjin's local Huiling Orphanage and TICCO.

== Images ==
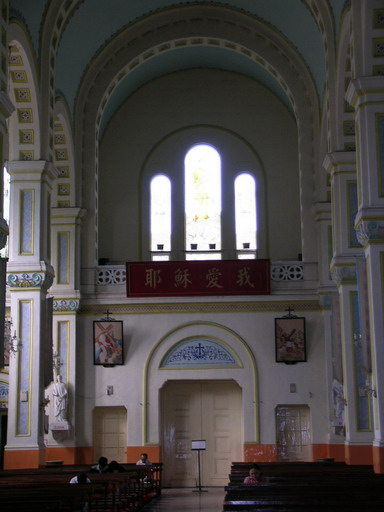
Church interior, rear view

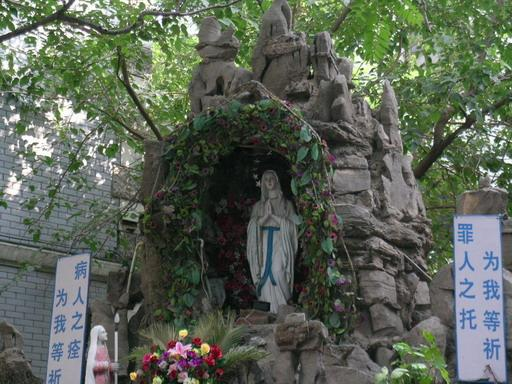
Virgin Mary outside the Church

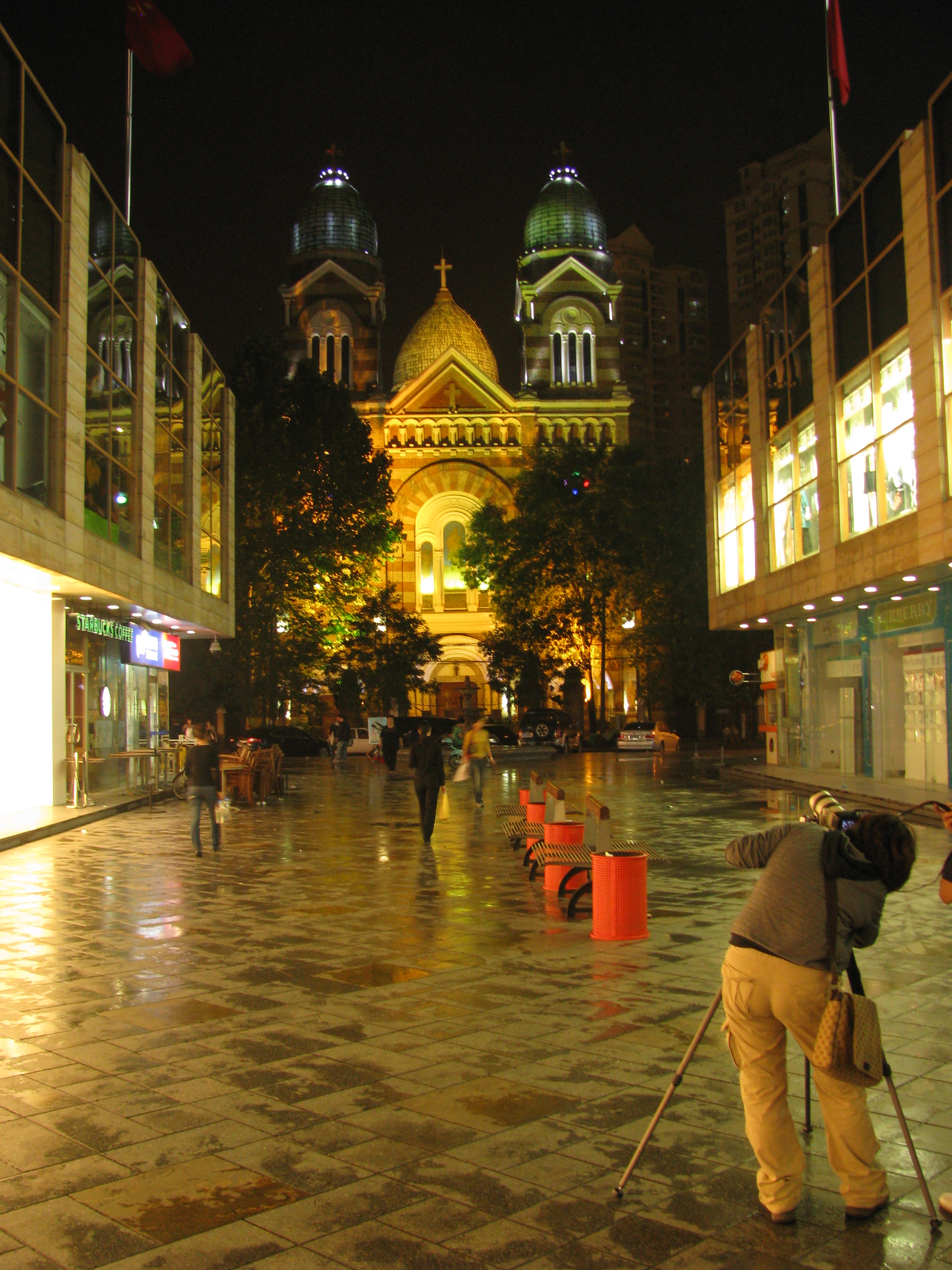
Church Night

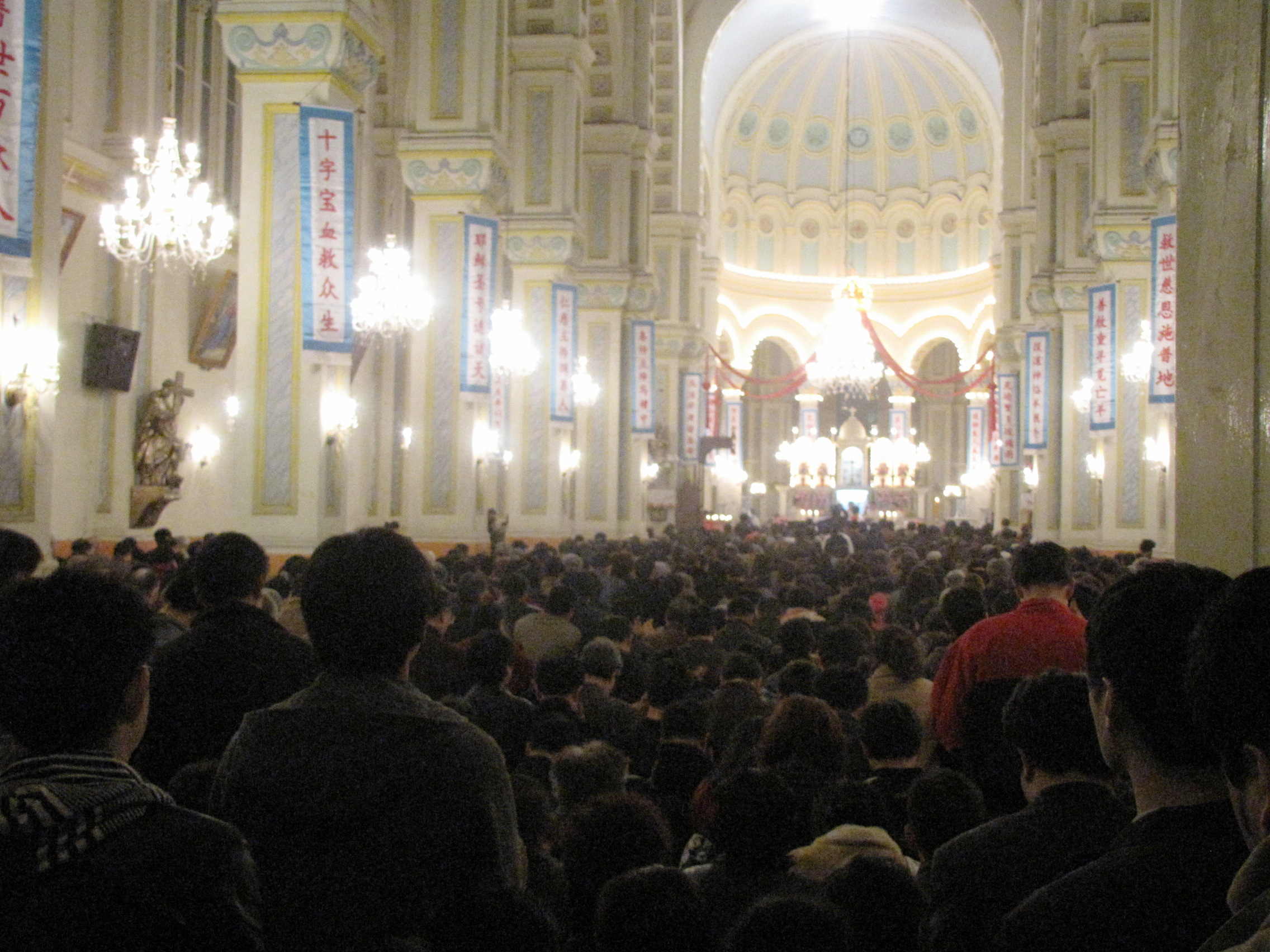
2010 Easter of the Western church
