= Tianjin Massacre =

1870 massacre in China

The Tianjin Massacre (Chinese: 天津教案; pinyin: Tiānjīn Jiào'àn; lit. 'Tianjin Religion Case'), also spelled the Tientsin Massacre, was an attack on Christian missionaries and converts in the late 19th century China during the late Qing dynasty. Sixty people died in attacks on French Catholic priests and nuns. There was intense belligerence from French diplomats, and armed foreign intervention in Tianjin (Tientsin) in 1870. The incident nearly precipitated a war and marked an end to relative cooperation between foreign powers and the Tongzhi court, and adversely affected the ongoing renegotiation of the Treaties of Tientsin, first signed in 1858. French Catholic missionaries were active in China; they were funded by appeals in French churches. The Holy Childhood Association (L'Oeuvre de la Sainte Enfance) was a Catholic charity founded in 1843 to rescue Chinese children from infanticide. It was a target of Chinese anti-Christian protests led by the local gentry who saw the need to defend Confucianism. Rioting sparked by false rumors of the killing of babies led to the death of a French consul and provoked a diplomatic crisis.

== Background ==
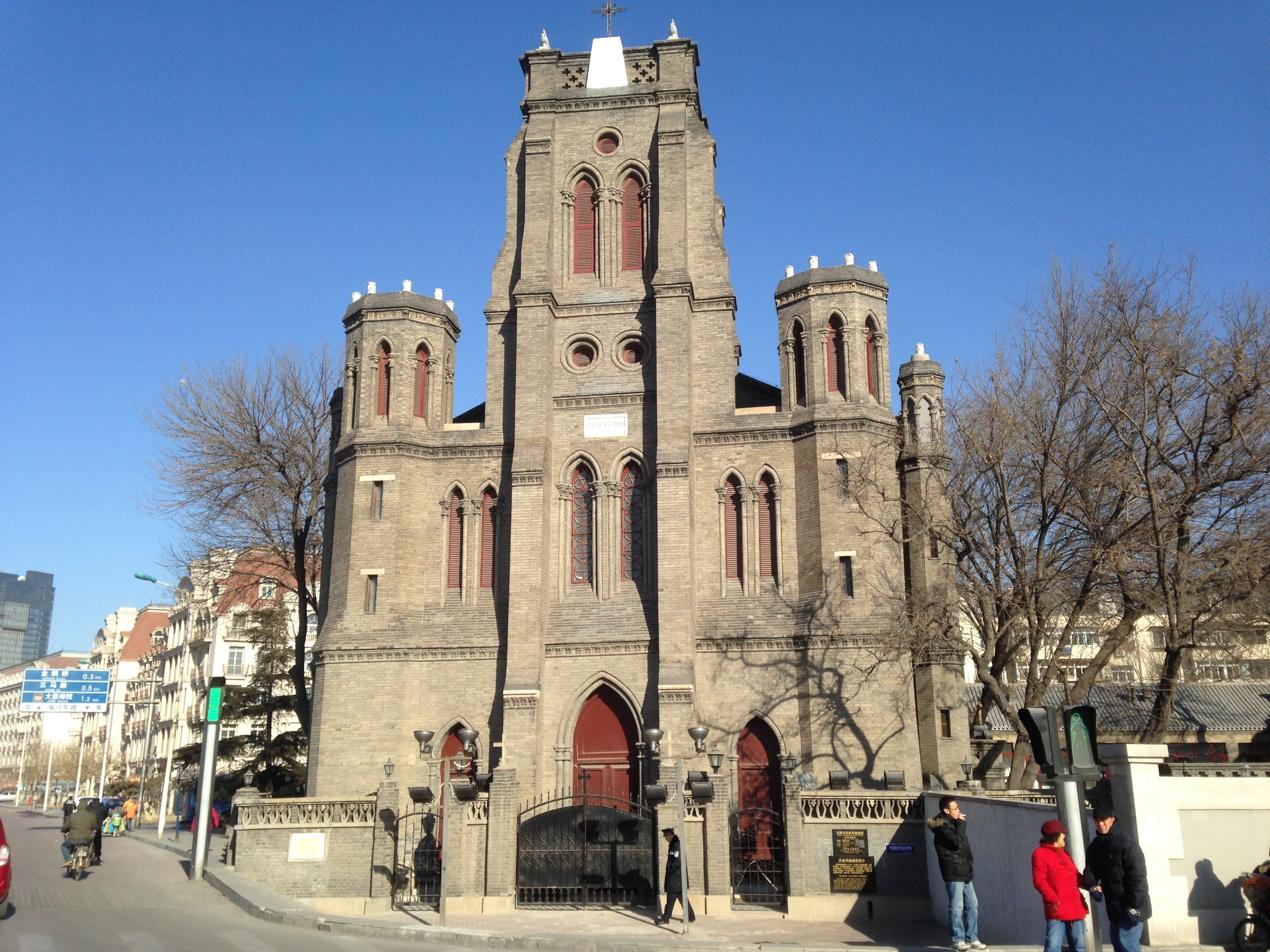
Église Notre-Dame-des-Victoires (Church of Our Lady's Victories), built in 1869, was the site of the Tianjin Massacre.

Around 1860, a Lazarist priest, Father Joseph Tsiou, began a mission in Tianjin. Tsiou was a skilled physician, who made it practice to baptize seriously ill infants whom he could not heal. This led to the impression that the baptism itself caused the deaths and there was opposition to this among the populace. Tsiou died in 1861 and was replaced by a French missionary and sisters of the congregation of the Daughters of Charity. In keeping with the Holy Childhood program popular at that time, the mission continued the practice of teaching and baptizing sick and abandoned children.

False rumors circulated for years that the missionaries killed children in order to remove the eyes for the manufacture of some expensive medicines. In June 1870, rumors spread throughout China concerning Catholic nuns who used to give small cash rewards to people who brought homeless or unwanted children to their orphanages. This led illicit child-brokers to engage in kidnapping. Throughout 1870, deaths at these orphanages increased due to outbreaks of disease. Tensions between Chinese residents of the northeastern port city of Tianjin (Tientsin) and western missionaries erupted in 1870 in the riot known as the Tianjin Massacre.

== Incident ==
The summer of 1870 was hotter and drier than usual, and the popular mood was unsettled. Angry and excited crowds assembled in the street from time to time in the neighborhood of the Mission buildings and demanded the release of the children. It does not appear that either the mission nor the French consul took any steps at this time to allay the public's fears. On June 18, two Chinese kidnappers were arrested 30 li outside Tianjin, were investigated and executed forthwith. According to Chonghou, Commissioner for the Three Ports, "Talk about kidnapping became more and more widespread among the populace. Because of this, the streets and alleys were not tranquil." Subsequently, the populace apprehended and sent in a "reader" from the church, Chen Xibao. He was beaten and sent to the magistrate. Through the Tianjin prefect, Liu Jie, he was interrogated and it was found that, in reality, he was leading students home, and was not kidnapping them. He was subsequently released. There was also a case in which the residents of Taohuakou apprehended and sent in Wu Lanzhen, who had kidnapped Li Suo. From the prefect's interrogation, Wang San from the church was implicated. Upon further investigation, the Chinese authorities determined that Wu Lanzhen had lied.

Chinese officials met with their French counterparts, who had assumed responsibility for the Catholic missions to China since the Arrow War. However, an angry anti-Christian crowd had gathered outside the cathedral and smashed windows. Chinese Catholic converts begged the French consul, Henri-Victor Fontanier, to appeal directly to Chonghou, the Commissioner for the Three Ports, for public calm.

== Commissioner Chonghou's account ==
While the Chinese magistrate's staff attempted to suppress the riot, the French consul visited the magistrate's official quarters to lodge a very angry complaint. Fontanier shot and wounded a Chinese assistant after an argument with the magistrate, under the threats of the mob. The French consul and his assistant, M. Simon, were murdered by the rioters and their bodies dumped in the river.

== Newspaper report ==
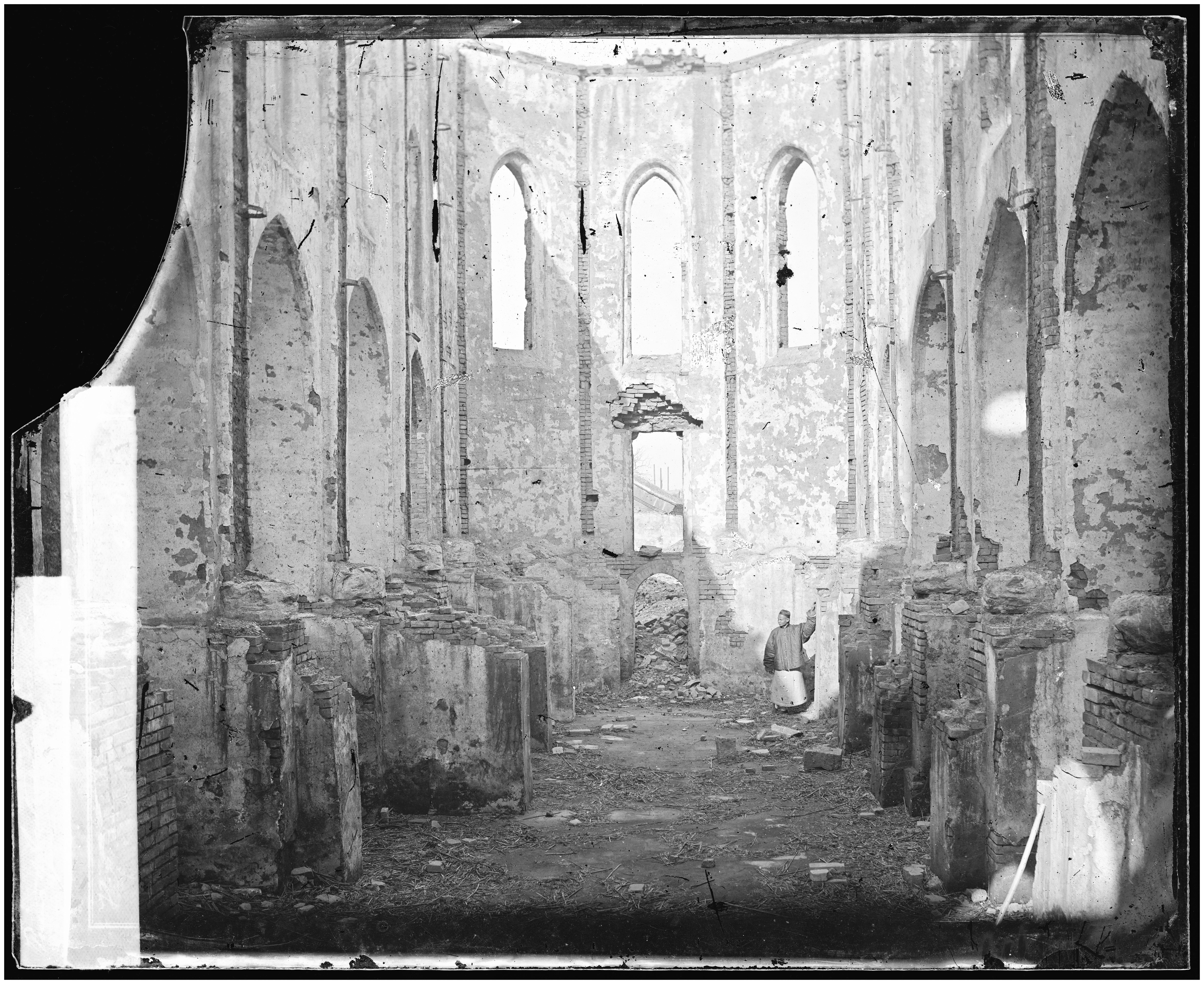
Chapel of the Sisters of Charity after the Tianjin Massacre

The London Pall Mall Gazette reported that on June 20, in anticipation of local unrest, the British consul at Tianjin, Mr. Lay, had contacted the British Minister, Mr. Wade, requesting that a man-of-war be sent to the port. It further said that Consul Fontanier and his aide M. Simon had been killed when the mob stormed the French consulate. The mob then proceeded to the mission property next door, which housed the recently completed Church of Our Lady of Victory, the presbytery, the convent, and orphanage.

The riot only ended after a number of Catholic institutions and foreign buildings, including the Tientsin Cathedral and four British and American churches, were burned down. As well as the two French Consular officials, two Lazarist priests, and approximately 40 Chinese Christians were killed, as were three Russian traders assumed by the mob to be French. A jar of pickled onions found was claimed to be the eyes torn from children. Ten nuns of the Daughters of Charity were raped and mutilated by the crowd before being killed. The final death toll of the riot was given at around 60.

== Aftermath ==
The Chinese government immediately condemned the riot. Foreign gunboats were sent to restore order to the legations of Tianjin, with reparations and reprisals demanded by the European governments. Chinese negotiations to mitigate the damage were led by the aging statesman Zeng Guofan. The situation was more complex than Zeng originally thought; he interrogated the orphans, who denied they had been kidnapped, and proclaimed the nuns innocent. Foldable hand fans began to appear depicting the murder of the French consul near the door of the church as political propaganda expressing resistance to Western countries and their religions. Europeans were incensed and demanded punishment against the riot's ringleaders. Zeng had eighteen Chinese instigators (or scapegoats, depending on who tells the history) executed and removed both the magistrate and much of his staff. A Chinese mission of apology sailed to France, under Imperial Commissioner Chonghou. A formal apology was presented to the provisional French head of state Adolphe Thiers in November 1871. China paid France the large sum of 400,000 taels as compensation.

The Tientsin Incident was far-reaching politically and culturally. Before 1870 the French and Chinese had been negotiating a clause to bring Western missionaries under the same guidelines as Chinese Buddhist and Taoist religious institutions, in the hope it would stop such situations as occurred at Tientsin. Afterwards, however, the French and Americans refused to allow Chinese control or protection over the spread of Christianity in the country. The Qing government replied in turn by refusing to either proscribe or endorse foreign missionaries. For Europeans, the riot and loss of life was further proof that the Chinese government could not be trusted to protect foreigners or their investments. For many Chinese, the fact Europeans and missionaries continued to be an elite outside the realms of Chinese law, and seemingly able to engage in actions through military force without serious repercussions, directly led to anti-foreign feeling which led to the Boxer Rebellion of 1900.

== See also ==
- Anti-missionary riots in China
- Chonghou, (1826–1893) a key diplomat
- Yangzhou riot, of 1868
