= Xingnan Subdistrict =

Xingnan Subdistrict 兴南街道
- Subdistrict
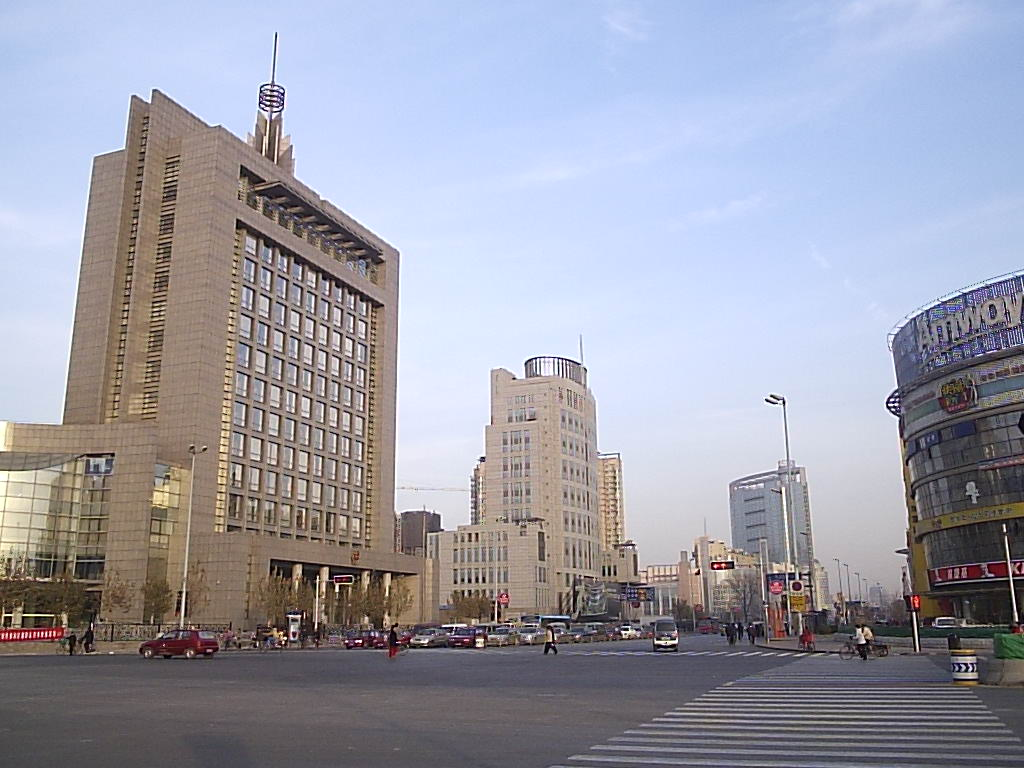
- Nanmenwai Avenue on the eastern side of the subdistrict, 2006

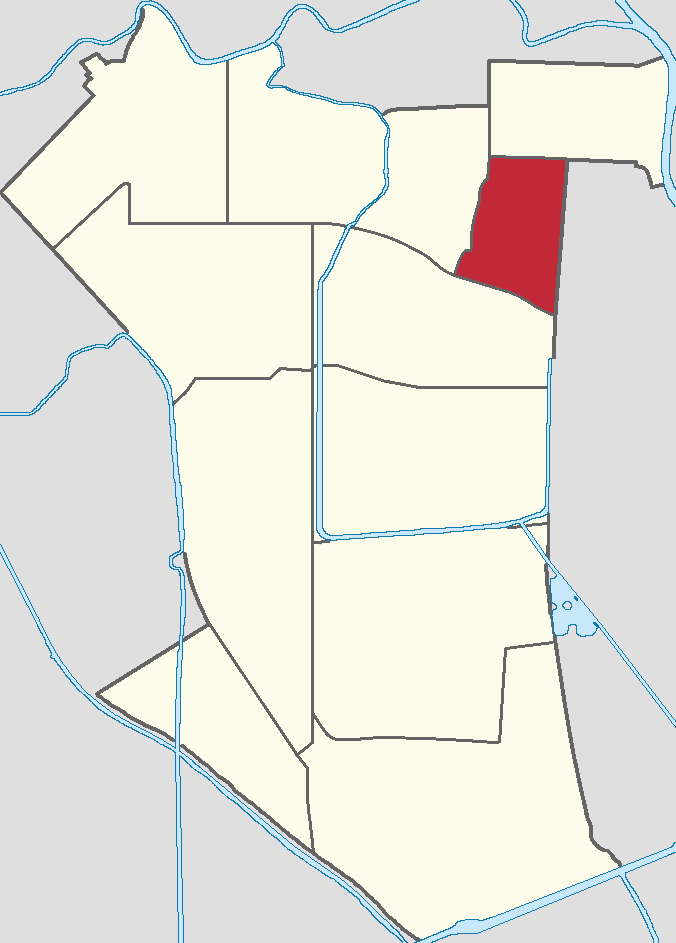
- Location of Xingnan Subdistrict in Nankai District

- Location within Tianjin Location within China
- Coordinates: 39°07′31″N 117°10′12″E
- Country: China
- Municipality: Tianjin
- District: Nankai
- Village-level Divisions: 9 communities

Area
  - Total: 1.45 km^{2} (0.56 sq mi)
- Elevation: 7 m (23 ft)

Population (2010)
  - Total: 43,744
  - Density: 30,200/km^{2} (78,100/sq mi)
- Time zone: UTC+8 (China Standard)
- Postal code: 300100
- Area code: 022

Xingnan Subdistrict (simplified Chinese: 兴南街道; traditional Chinese: 興南街道; pinyin: Xìngnán Jiēdào) is a subdistrict situated on the northeast of Nankai District, Tianjin, China. It borders Gulou Subdistrict to its north, Nanshi and Quanyechang Subdistricts to its east. Wanxing Subdistrict to its south, Guangkai Subdistrict to its west. In the year 2010, the subdistrict had 43,744 inhabitants under its administration.

The subdistrict was created from Paotaizhuang and Nanmenxi Subdistricts in 1999. Its name Xingnan (Chinese: 兴南; lit. 'Prosper South') was given with the intended meaning of "Make Nankai District Prosperous".

== Administrative divisions ==
As of the year 2021, Xingnan Subdistrict consisted of the following 9 residential communities:

Subdivision names	Name transliterations
南马路	Nanmalu
龙凤里	Longfengli
耀远里	Yaoyuanli
紫光苑	Ziguangyuan
昆裕里	Kunyuli
怀庆里	Huaiqingli
延生里	Yanshengli
源德里	Yuandeli
五马路	Wumalu

== Gallery ==
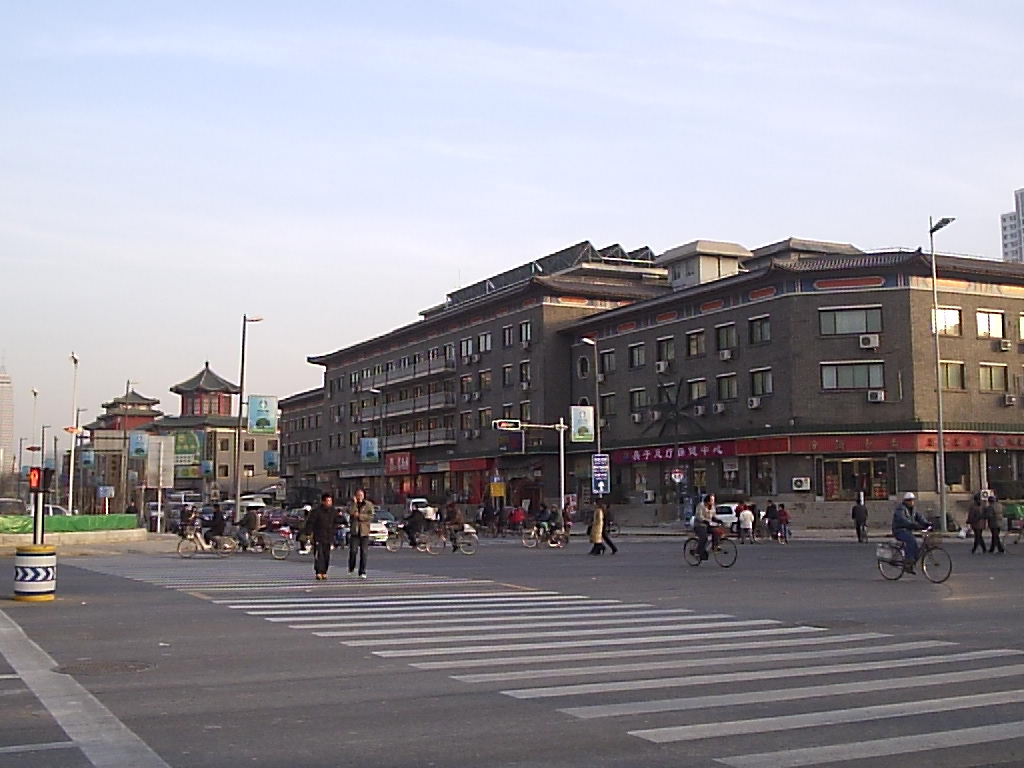
Nanmenwai Avenue, 2006

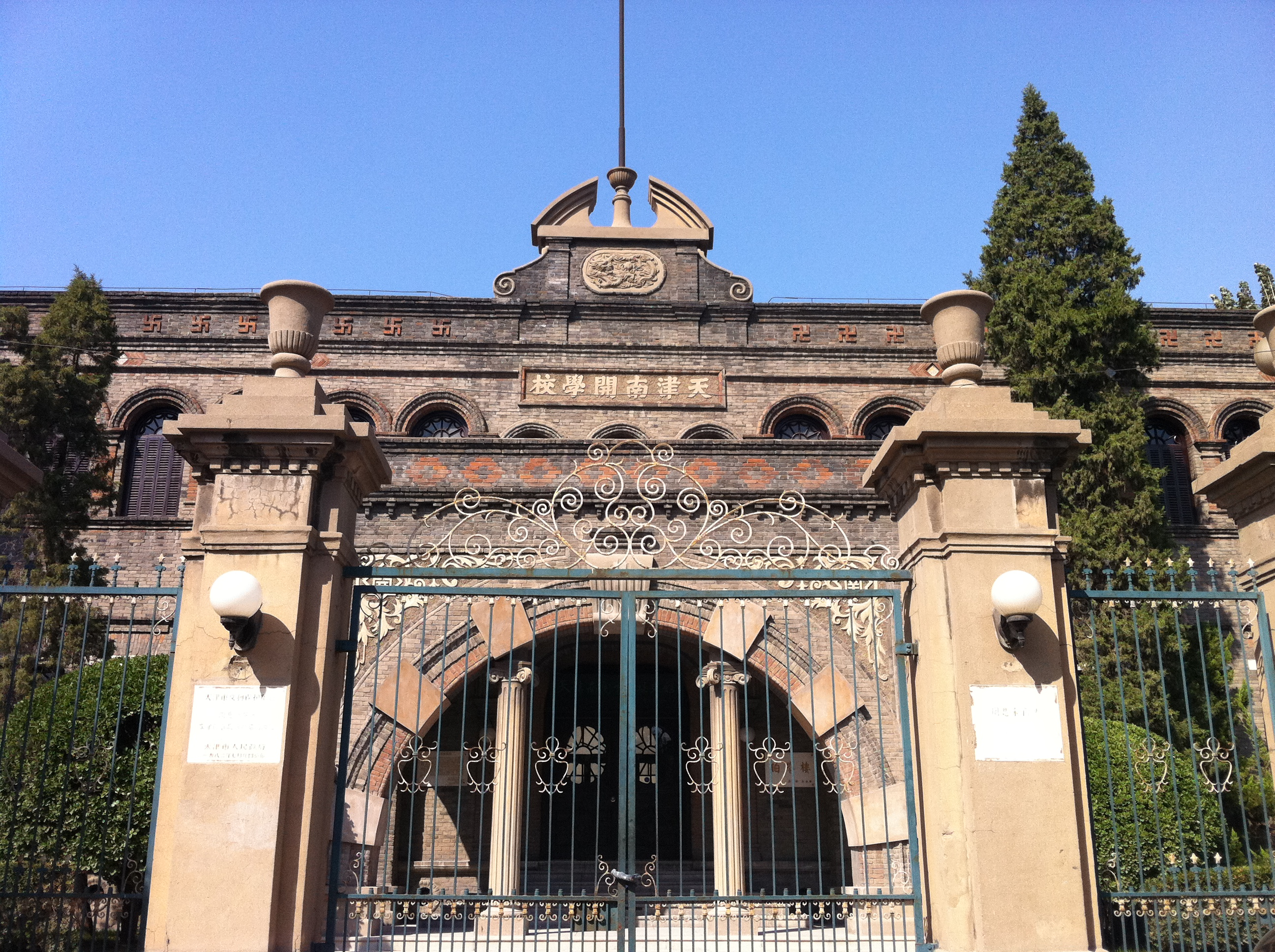
Former site of Nankai School, 2011

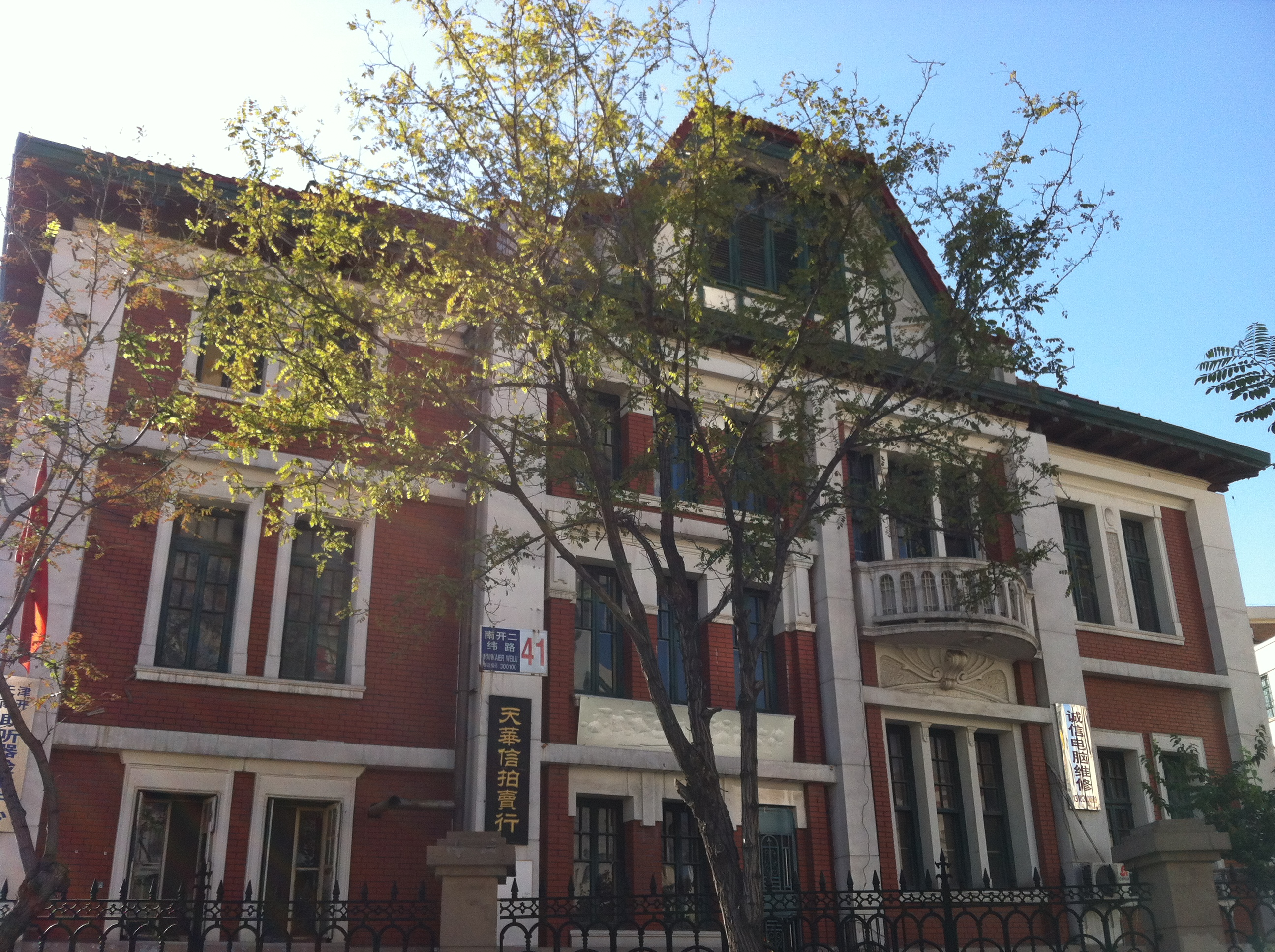
Former Residence of Yang Yide, 2011

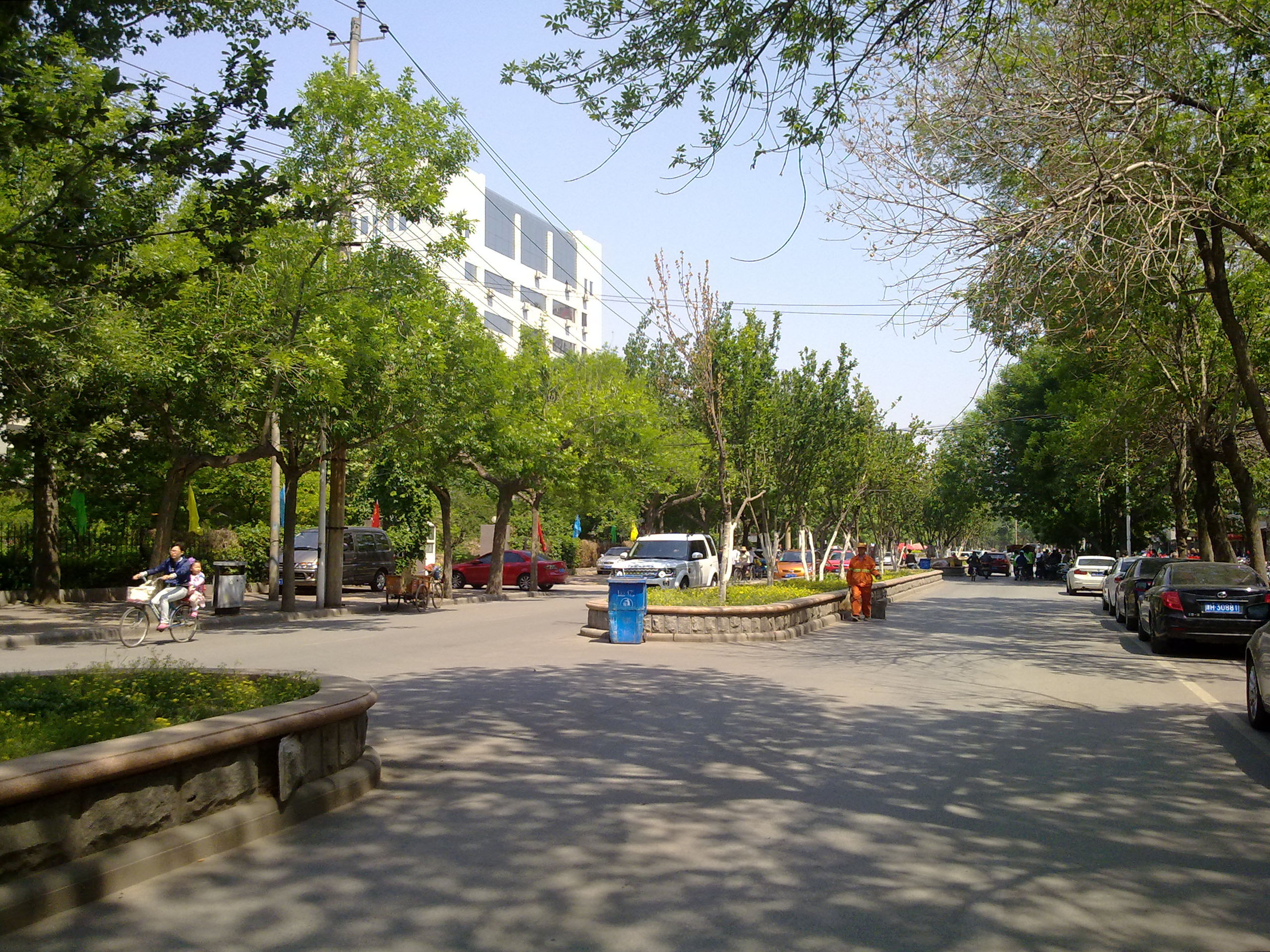
Wumalu Community, 2014
