= Xinxing District =

Xinxing District may refer to:

- Xinxing District, Qitaihe, Heilongjiang, China
- Sinsing District, Kaohsiung, Taiwan

== See also ==
- Xinxing (disambiguation), other places named Xinxing
