= Nanshi Subdistrict, Tianjin =

Nanshi Subdistrict 南市街道
- Subdistrict
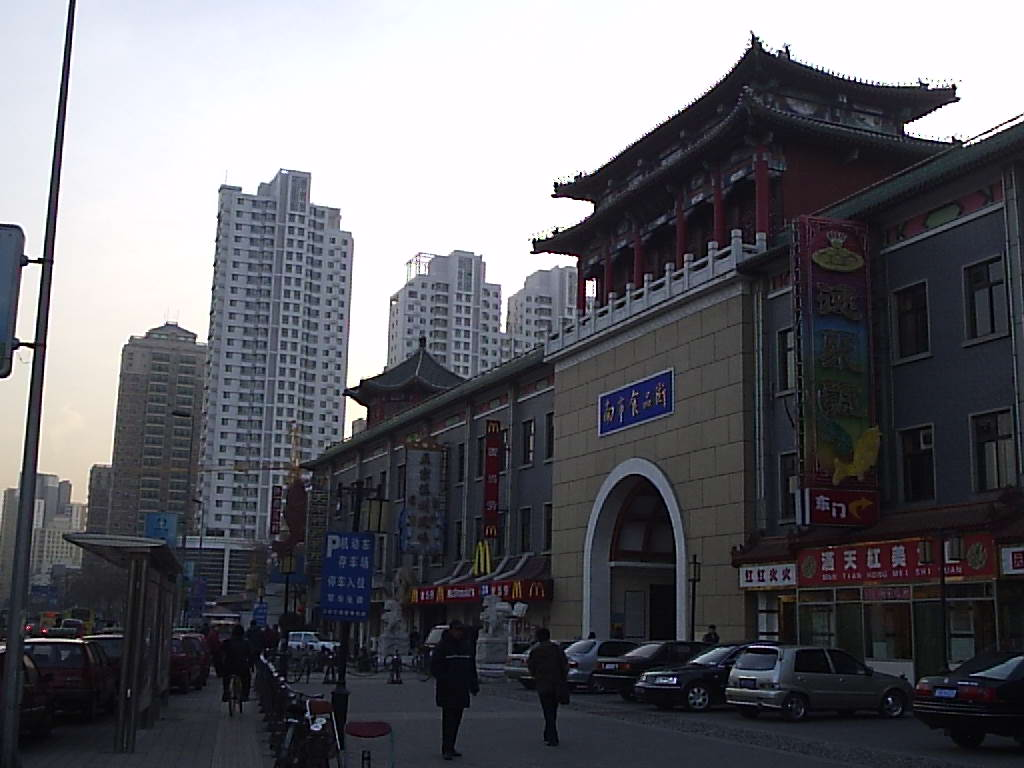
- Eastern end of Shipingjie Community, 2006

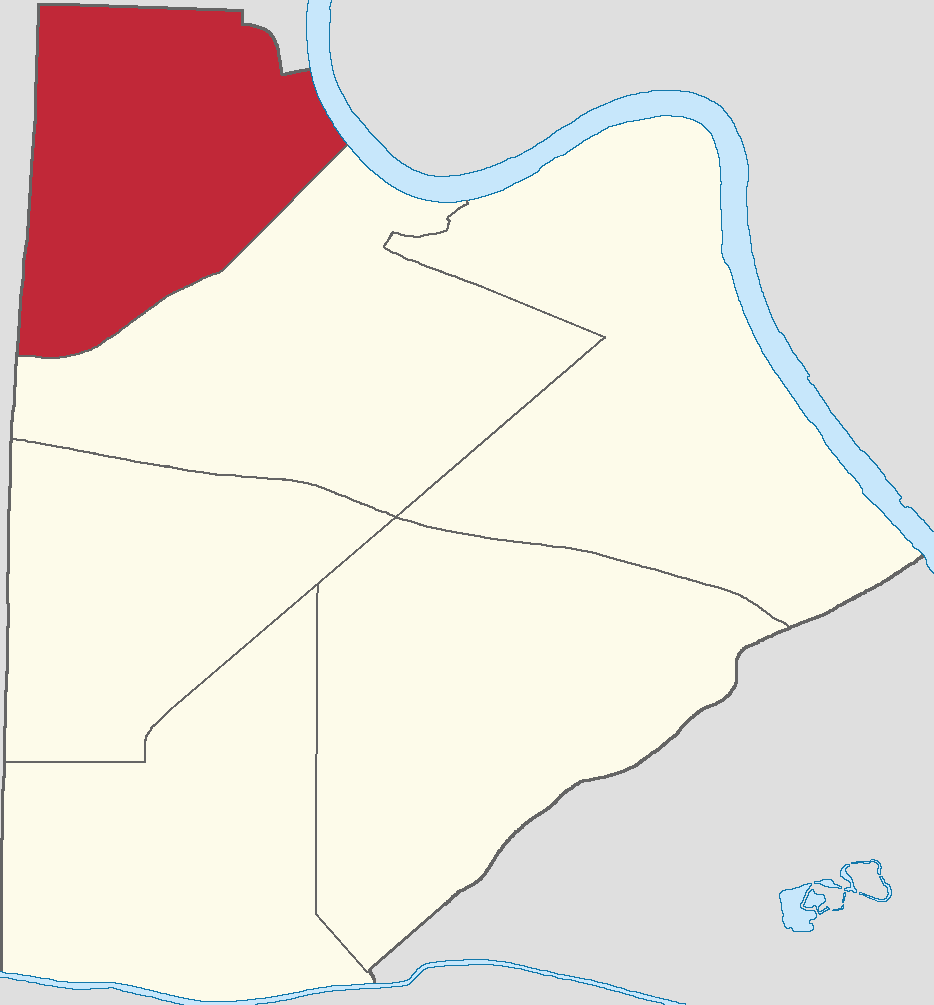
- Location of Nanshi Subdistrict within Heping District

- Location within Tianjin Location within China
- Coordinates: 39°07′39″N 117°10′53″E
- Country: China
- Municipality: Tianjin
- District: Heping
- Village-level Divisions: 9 communities

Area
  - Total: 1.27 km^{2} (0.49 sq mi)
- Elevation: 7 m (23 ft)

Population (2010)
  - Total: 33,874
  - Density: 26,700/km^{2} (69,100/sq mi)
- Time zone: UTC+8 (China Standard)
- Postal code: 300021
- Area code: 022

Nanshi Subdistrict (Chinese: 南市街道; pinyin: Nánshì Jiēdào) is a subdistrict situated on the northwestern part of Heping District, Tianjin. it borders Gulou Subdistrict to its north, Guangfudao Subdistrict to its east, Quanyechang Subdistrict to its south, and Xingnan Subdistrict to its west. It had 33,874 inhabitants under its administration as of 2010.

The name Nanshi literally means "Southern City" or "Southern Market".

== History ==
Timeline of Nanshi's History
Year	Status	Within
1955 - 1956	8 Subdistricts	1st District, Tianjin
1956 - 1958	7 Subdistricts: Qingehjie; Nanmenwai; Nanmendong; Xing'an Road; Luzhuangzi; Haiguagnsi; Dongxing Shichang	Heping District, Tianjin
1958 - 1960	Qinghe Subdistrict Xing'an Road Subdistrict Dongxing Shichang Subdistrict	Heping District, Tianjin
1960 - 1962	Xing'an Road People's Commune	Heping District, Tianjin
1962 - 1998	Qinghe Subdistrict Xing'an Road Subdistrict Dongxing Shichang Subdistrict	Heping District, Tianjin
1998–present	Nanshi Subdistrict	Heping District, Tianjin

== Administrative divisions ==
In 2021, Nanshi Subdistrict was composed of 9 communities. They are listed as follows:

Subdivision names	Name transliterations
庆有西里	Qingyou Xili
怀远里	Huaiyuanli
福厚西里	Fuhou Xili
福方里	Fufangli
裕德里	Yudeli
新文化花园	Xinwenhua Huayuan
新世界花园	Xinshijie Huayuan
食品街	Shipingjie
大都会	Daduhui

== Gallery ==
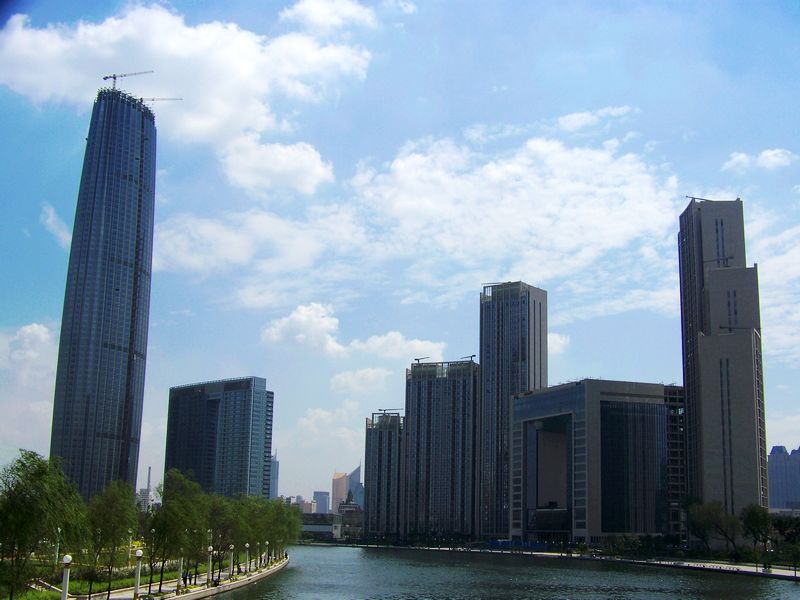
Both sides of Hai River east of the subdistrict, 2010

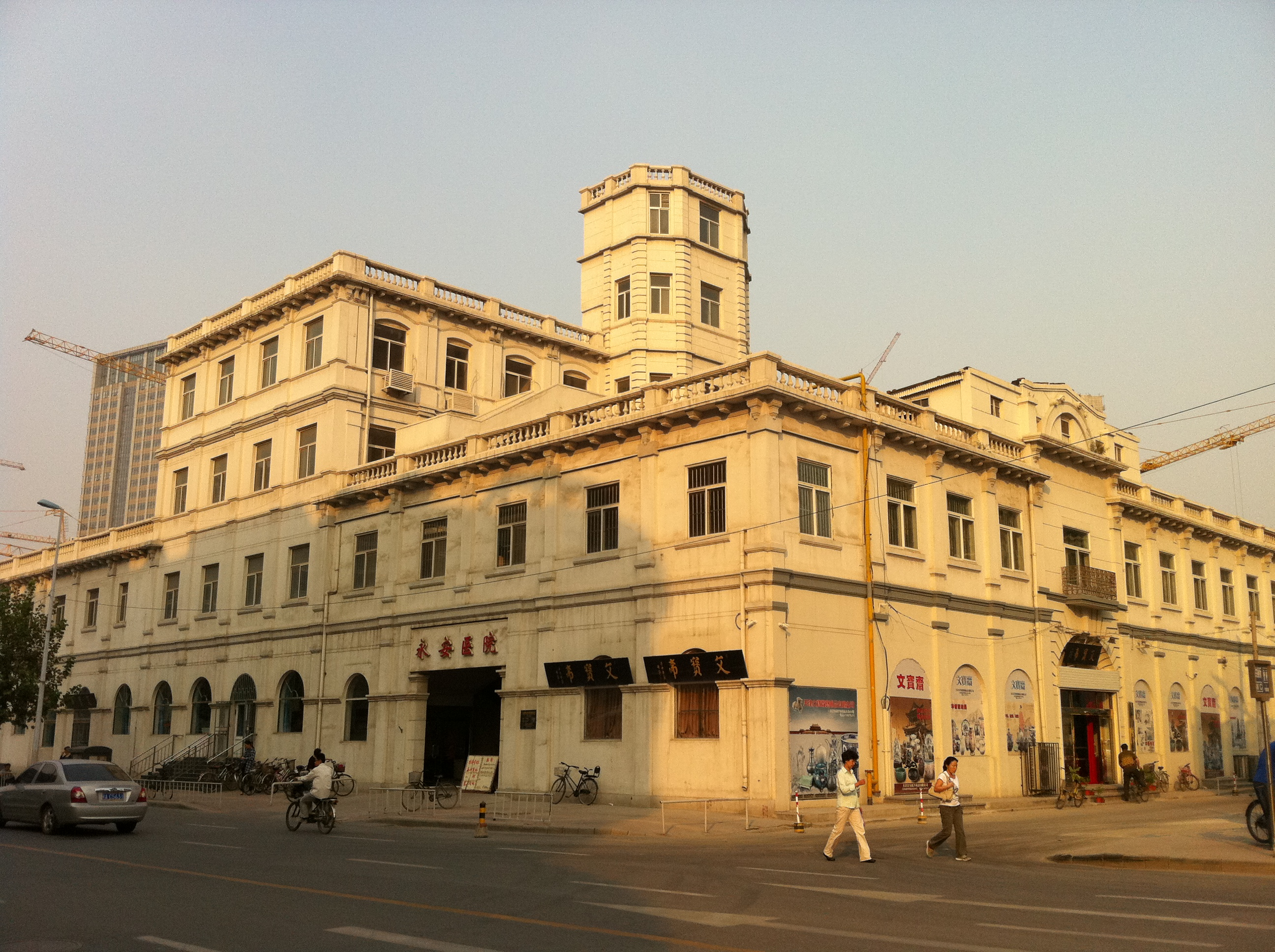
Yong'an Hospital, 2011

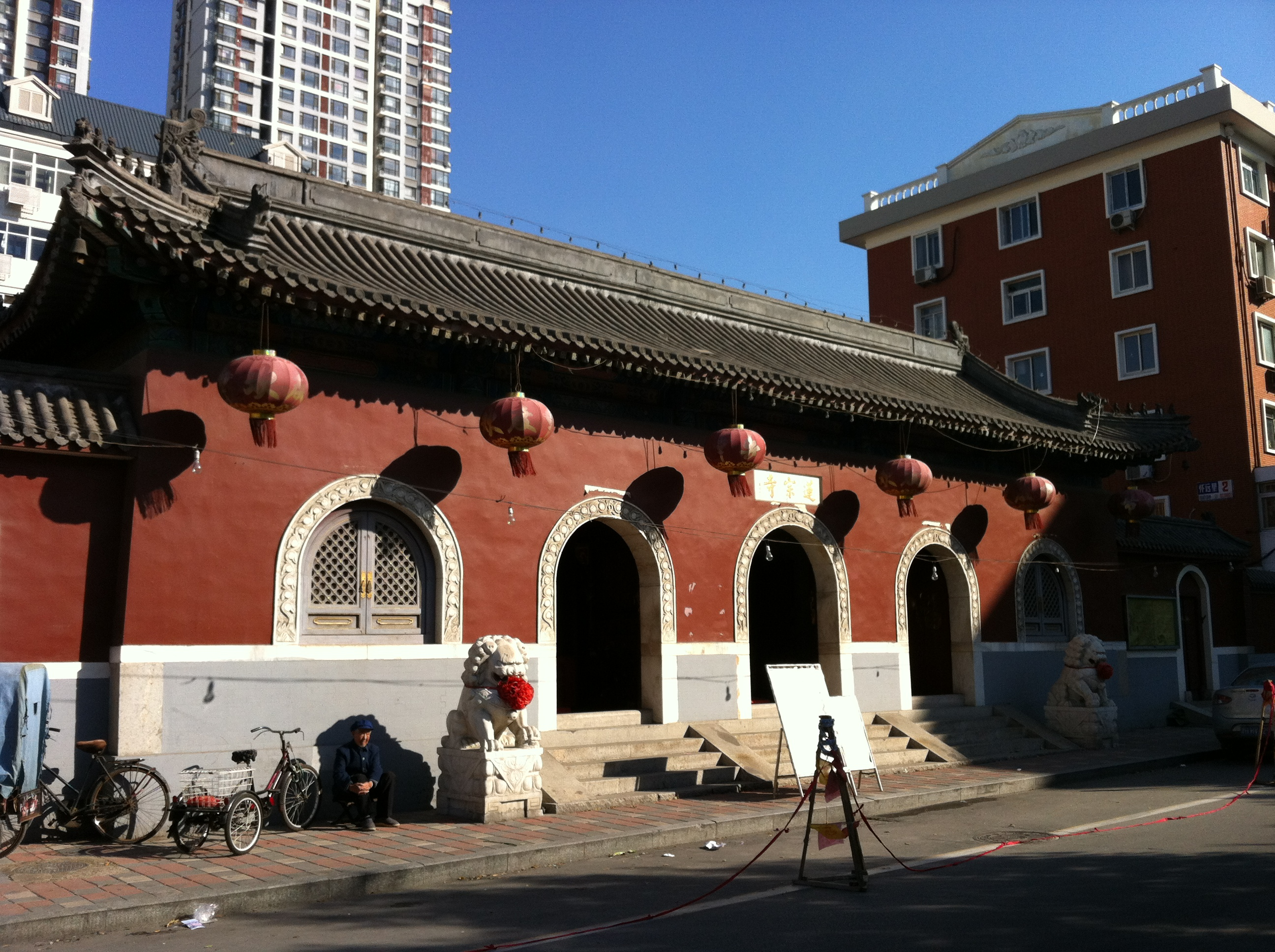
Lianzong Temple, 2011

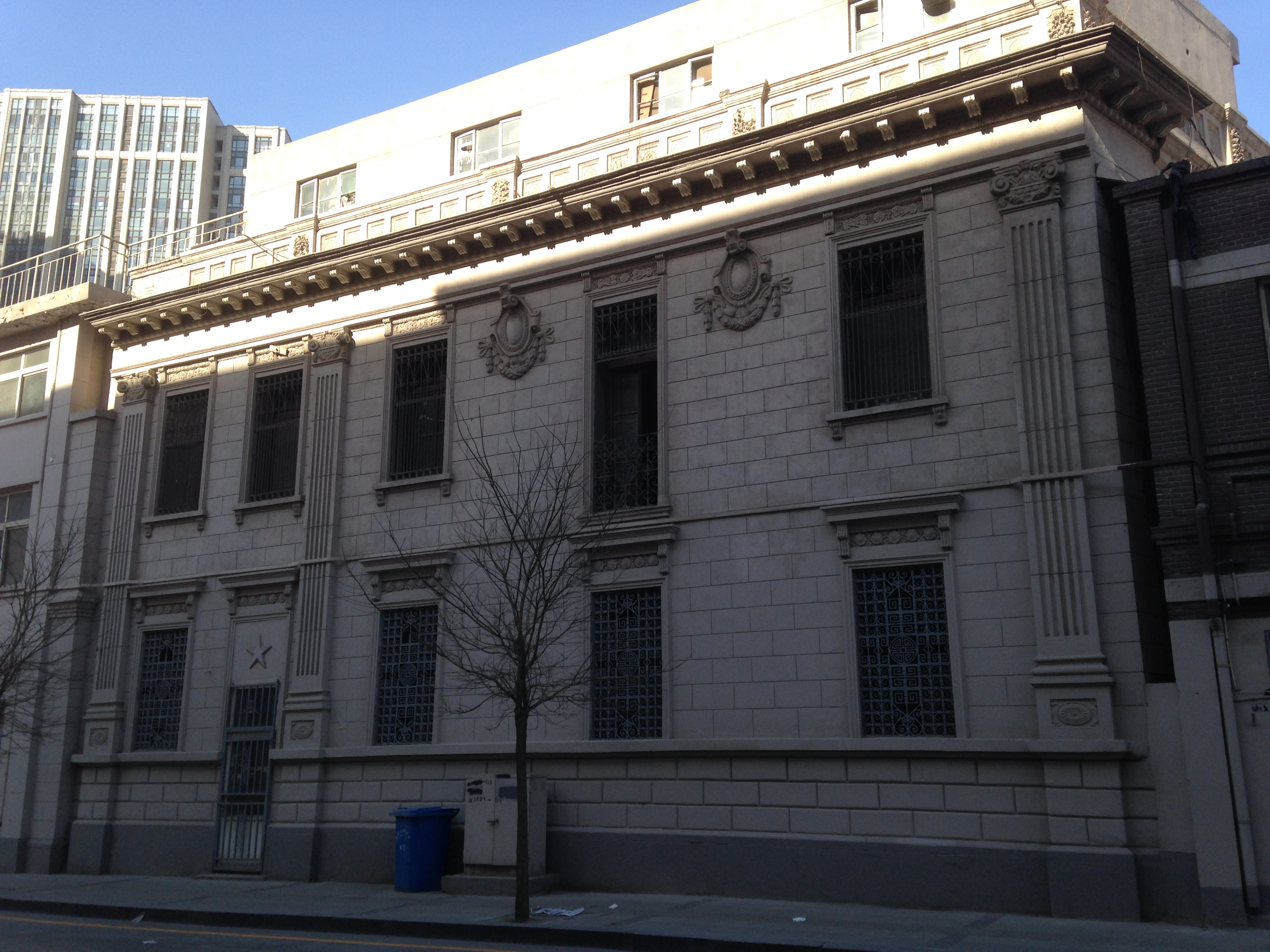
Rongji Street, 2014
