= Xinxing Subdistrict, Tianjin =

Xinxing Subdistrict 新兴街道
- Subdistrict
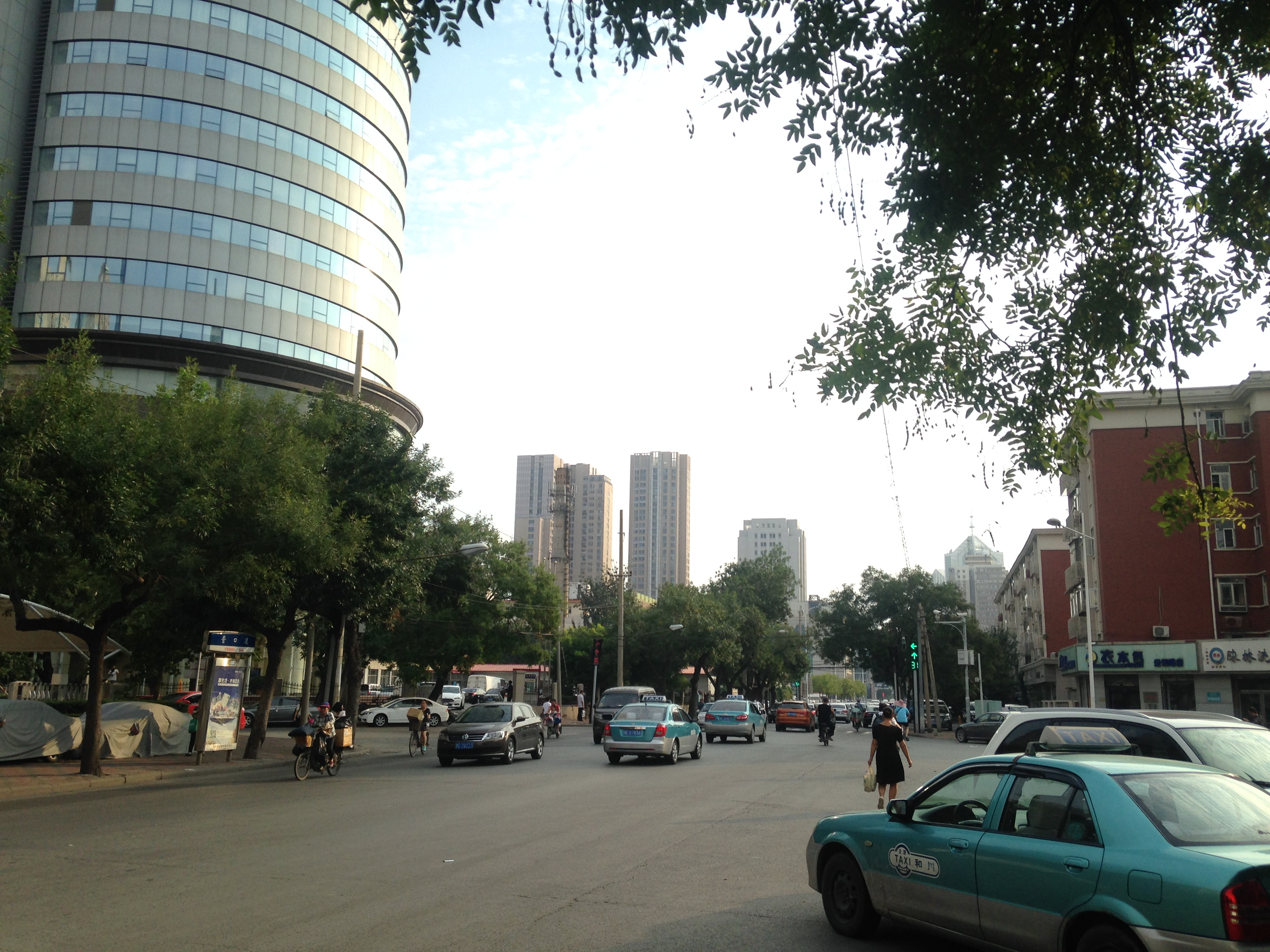
- Yingkoudao Road within the subdistrict, 2016

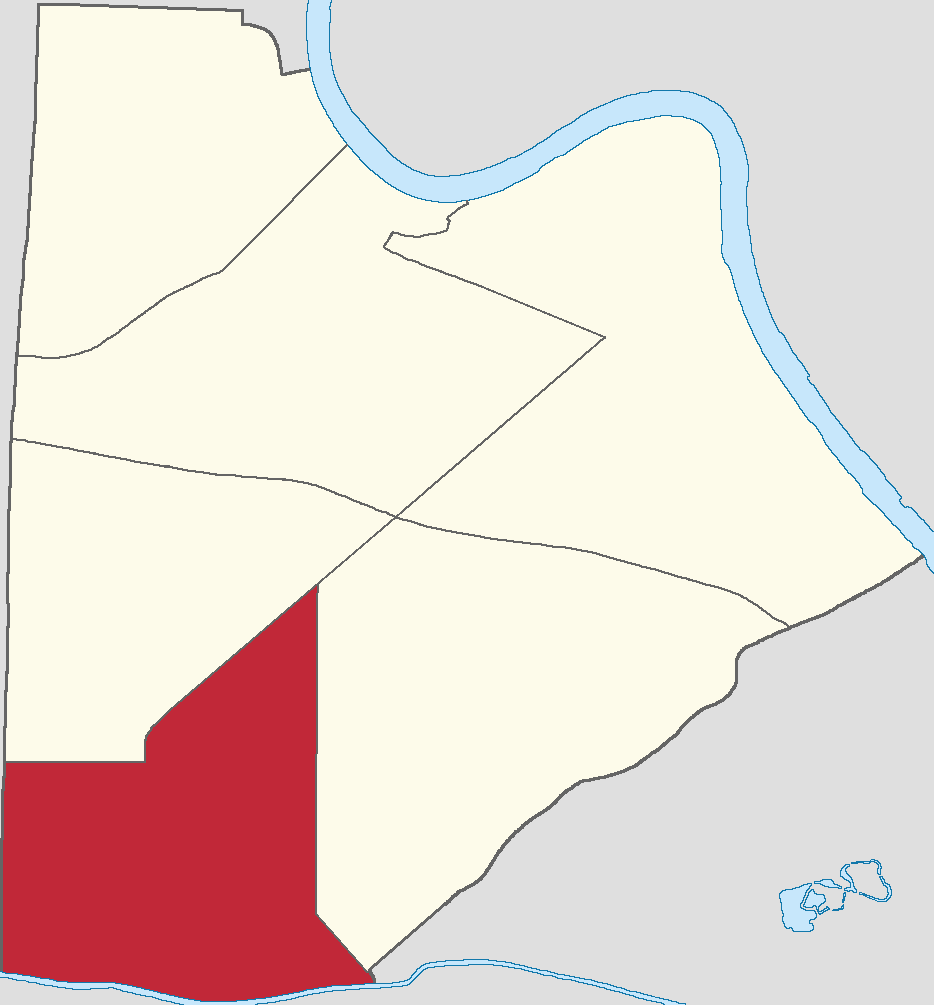
- Location within Heping District

- Location within Tianjin Location within China
- Coordinates: 39°06′20″N 117°11′11″E
- Country: China
- Municipality: Tianjin
- District: Heping
- Village-level Divisions: 11 communities

Area
  - Total: 1.48 km^{2} (0.57 sq mi)
- Elevation: 9 m (30 ft)

Population (2010)
  - Total: 60,343
  - Density: 40,800/km^{2} (106,000/sq mi)
- Time zone: UTC+8 (China Standard)
- Postal code: 300041
- Area code: 022

Xinxing Subdistrict (simplified Chinese: 新兴街道; traditional Chinese: 新興街道; pinyin: Xīnxīng Jiēdào) is a subdistrict inside of Heping District, Tianjin. it borders Nanyingmen Subdistrict in its north, Wudadao and Taoyuan Subdistricts in its east, Machang Subdistrict in its south, and Xuefu Subdistrict in its west. In the year 2010, its population was 60,343.

The name Xinxing is taken from Xinxing Road within the subdistrict, and it can be translates to "New Prosperity".

== History ==
Timeline of Xinxing Subdistrict
Year	Status	Part of
1903 - 1941		British concession of Tianjin
1941 - 1945		Wang Jingwei regime
1945 - 1949		6th District, Tianjin
1949 - 1953	Hexingcun Street Office Tongchengli Street Office	10th District, Tianjin
1953 - 1954	Hexingcun Street Office Wujiayao Gongren Xincun Street Office	10th District, Tianjin
1954 - 1958	Hexingcun Subdistrict	Xinhua District, Tianjin
1958 - 1960	Xinxing Subdistrict	Heping District, Tianjin
1960 - 1962	Xinxingjie People's Commune	Heping District, Tianjin
1962 - 1968	Xinxing Subdistrict	Heping District, Tianjin
1968 - 1979	Xinxingjie Revolutionary Committee	Heping District, Tianjin
1979–present	Xinxing Subdistrict	Heping District, Tianjin

== Administrative divisions ==
At the end of 2021, Xinxing Subdistrict was formed from 11 communities. They are listed in the table below:

Subdivision names	Name transliterations
新兴南里	Xinxing Nanli
新兴北里	Xinxing Beili
永丰里	Yongfengli
土山花园	Tushan Huayuan
金泉里	Jinquanli
犀地	Xidi
朝阳里	Chaoyangli
兴河里	Xingheli
卫华里	Weihuali
卫津路	Weijinlu
西康路	Xikanglu

== Gallery ==
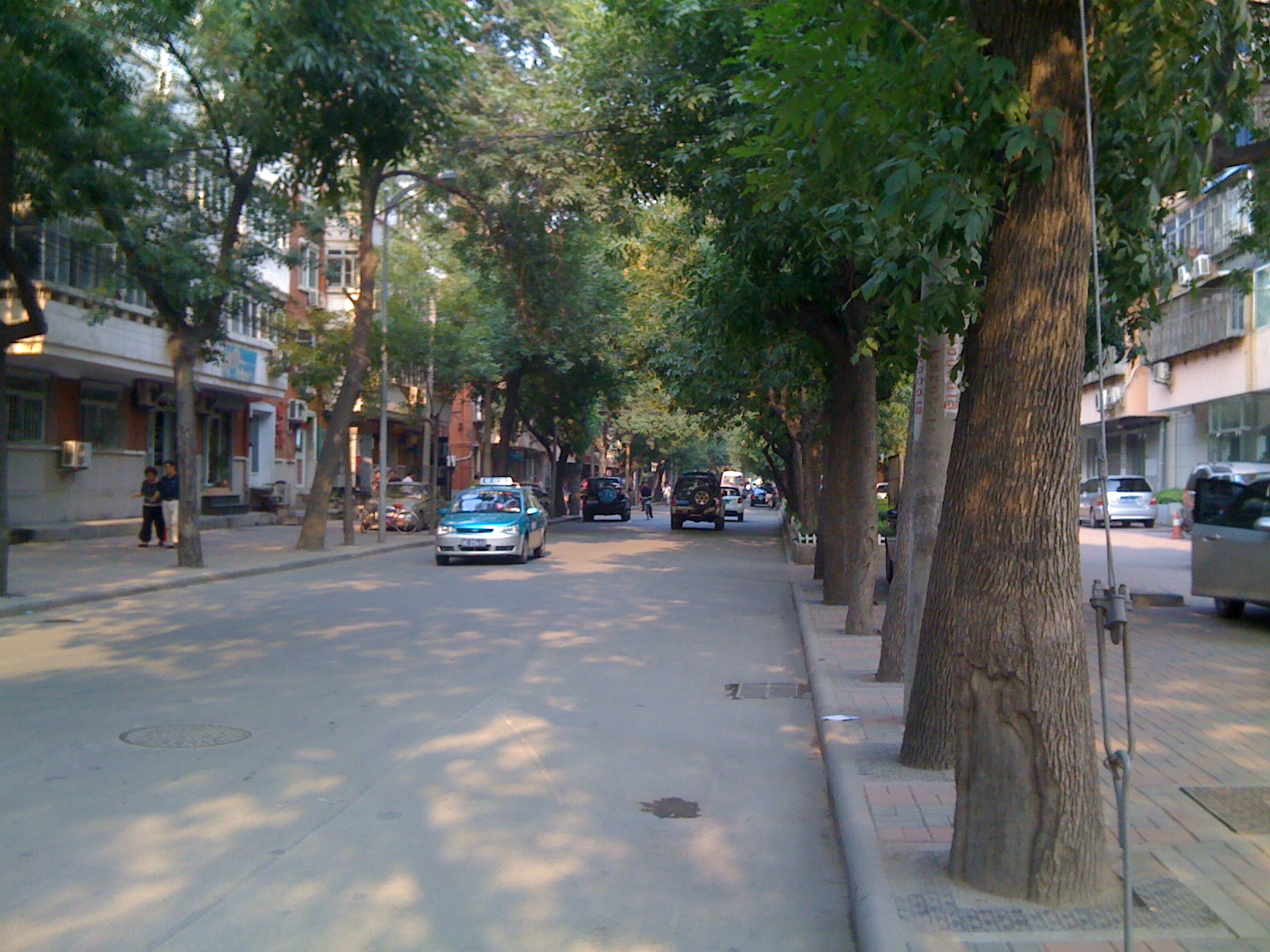
Tong'an Avenue on the southwest of the Subdistrict, 2010

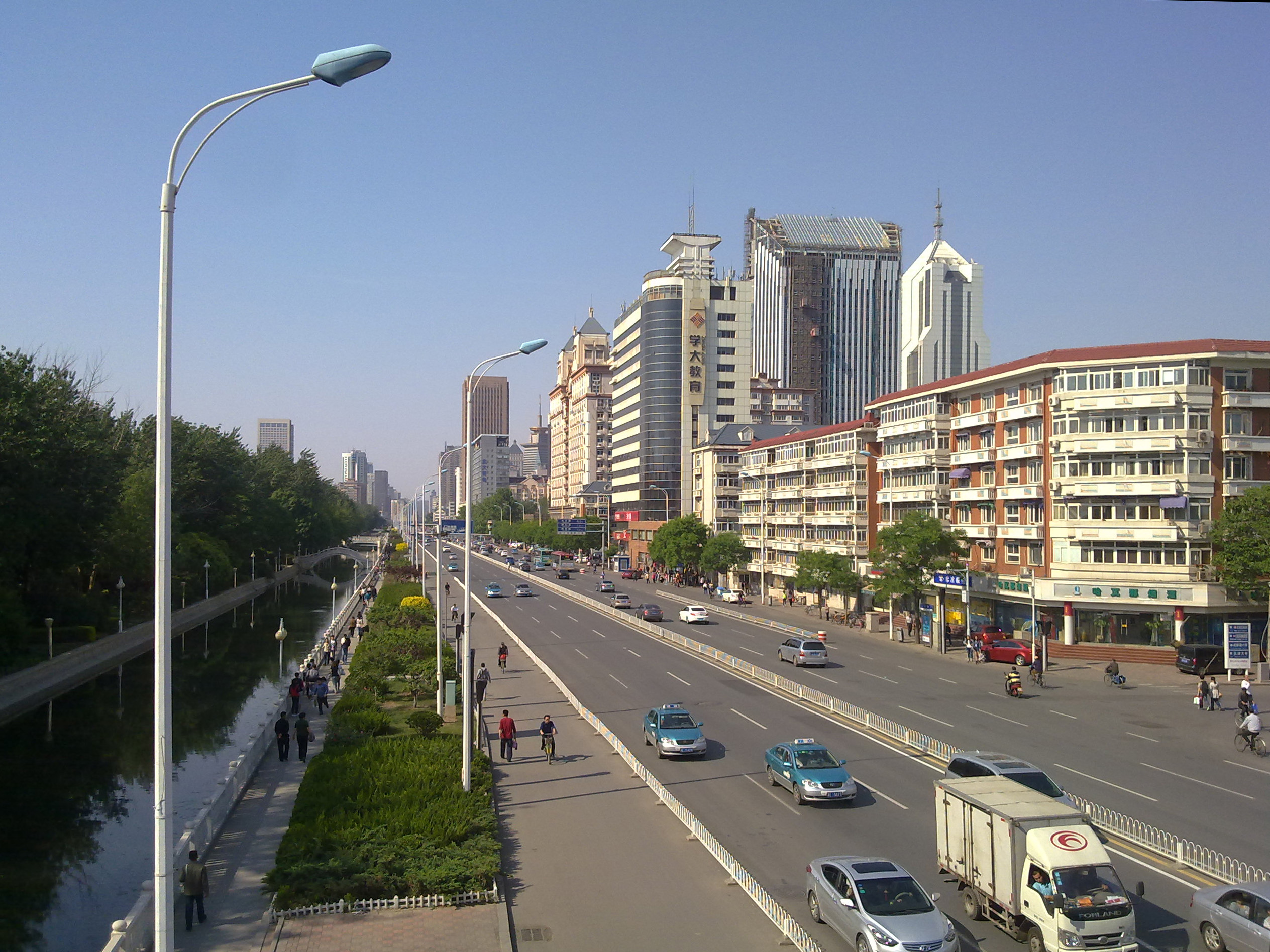
Weijin Road, the western border of Xinxing, 2014

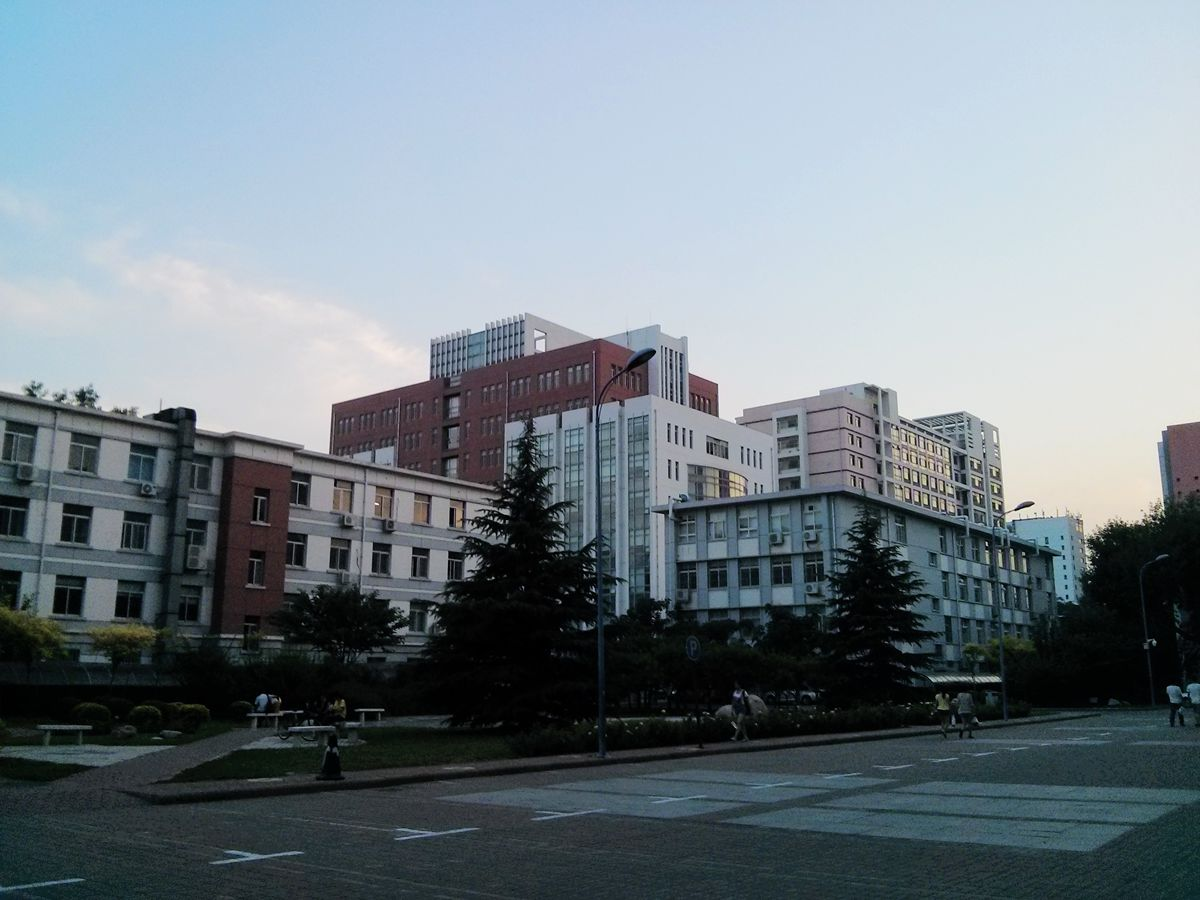
Campus of Tianjin Medical University, 2014

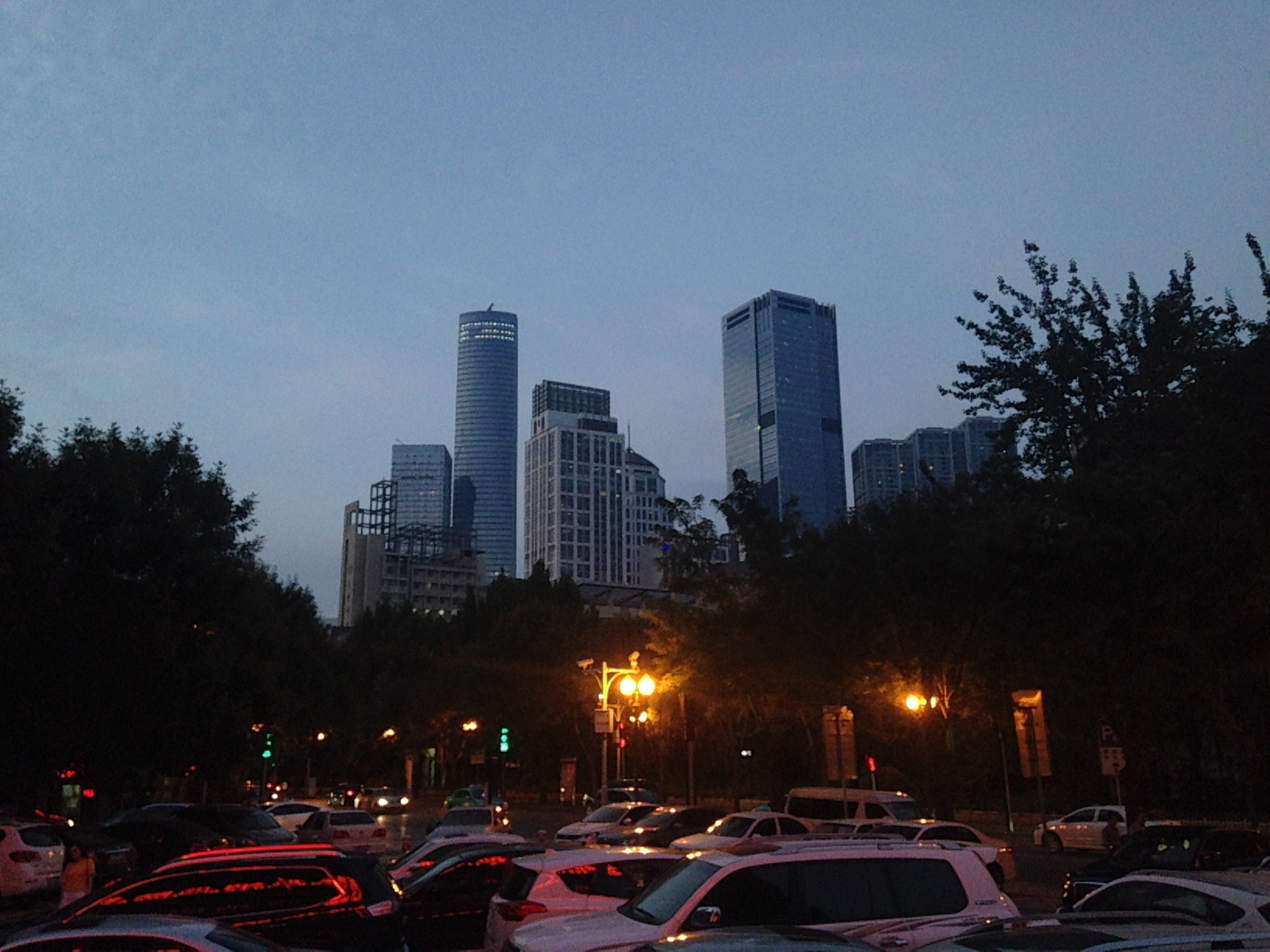
Night view of the subdistrict, 2016
