= Xinxing =

Xinxing may refer to:

== Taiwan ==
- Sinsing District (新興區), Kaohsiung

== Mainland China ==
- Xinxing County (新兴县), of Yunfu, Guangdong
- Xinxing District, Qitaihe (新兴区), Heilongjiang
- Xinxing Township (disambiguation) (新兴乡), for all townships named Xinxing
- Xinxing, Xinjiang (新星市), a county-level city in Xinjiang

Subdistricts (新兴街道)

- Xinxing Subdistrict, Jieyang, in Rongcheng District, Jieyang, Guangdong
- Xinxing Subdistrict, Zhanjiang, in Xiashan District, Zhanjiang, Guangdong
- Xinxing Subdistrict, Anda
- Xinxing Subdistrict, Mudanjiang, in Yangming District, Mudanjiang, Heilongjiang
- Xinxing Subdistrict, Qiqihar, in Ang'angxi District, Qiqihar, Heilongjiang
- Xinxing Subdistrict, Yichun, Heilongjiang, in Xilin District, Yichun, Heilongjiang
- Xinxing Subdistrict, Xuchang, in Weidu District, Xuchang, Henan
- Xinxing Subdistrict, Liaoyuan, in Longshan District, Liaoyuan, Jilin
- Xinxing Subdistrict, Yanji, Jilin
- Xinxing Subdistrict, Donggang, Liaoning
- Xinxing Subdistrict, Fuxin, in Haizhou District, Fuxin, Liaoning
- Xinxing Subdistrict, Shenyang, in Heping District, Shenyang, Liaoning
- Xinxing Subdistrict, Yingkou, in Zhanqian District, Yingkou, Liaoning
- Xinxing Subdistrict, Xi'an, in Yanliang District, Xi'an, Shaanxi
- Xinxing Subdistrict, Xianyang, in Weicheng District, Xianyang, Shaanxi
- Xinxing Subdistrict, Jiaxing, in Nanhu District, Jiaxing, Zhejiang
- Xinxing Subdistrict, Tianjin, in Heping District, Tianjin
- Xinxing Subdistrict, Harbin, in Shuangcheng District, Harbin

Towns

Written as "辛兴镇":

- Xinxing, Li County, Hebei
- Xinxing, Zhucheng, Shandong

Written as "新兴镇":

- Xinxing, Woyang County, Anhui
- Xinxing, Qing County, Hebei
- Xinxing, Gangu County, Gansu
- Xinxing, Tunchang County, Hainan
- Xinxing, Yancheng, in Tinghu District, Yancheng, Jiangsu
- Xinxing, Heishan County, Liaoning
- Xinxing, Dawa County, Liaoning
- Xinxing, Sanyuan County, Shaanxi
- Xinxing, Cangshan County, Shandong
- Xinxing, Shuangliu County, Sichuan
- Xinxing, Pengzhou, Sichuan
