= Xinxing Township =

Xinxing Township (新兴乡) could refer to the following places in the People's Republic of China:

- Xinxing Township, Yi'an County, Heilongjiang
- Xinxing Township, Hanshou County, Hunan
- Xinxing Township, Tongyu County, Jilin
- Xinxing Township, Yitong County, in Yitong Manchu Autonomous County, Jilin
- Xinxing Township, Luding County, Sichuan
- Xinxing Township, Mianning County, Sichuan
- Xinxing Township, Songyang County, Zhejiang
- Xinxing Oroqen Ethnic Township (新兴鄂伦春族乡), Xunke County, Heilongjiang
- Xinxing Township, Gangu County, Gansu

See also

- Xinxing (disambiguation)
