= Heping, Tianjin =

Heping 和平区
- District
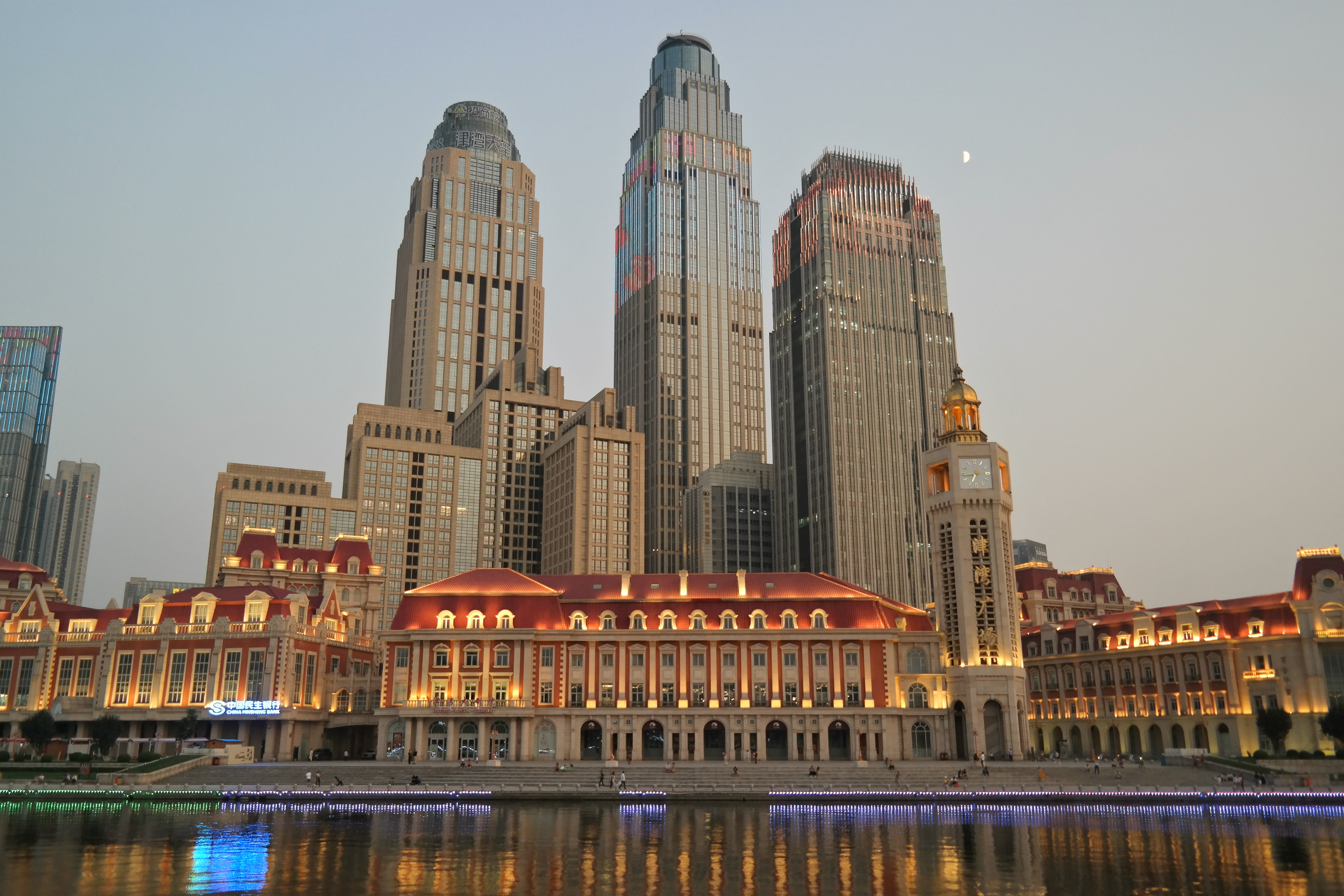
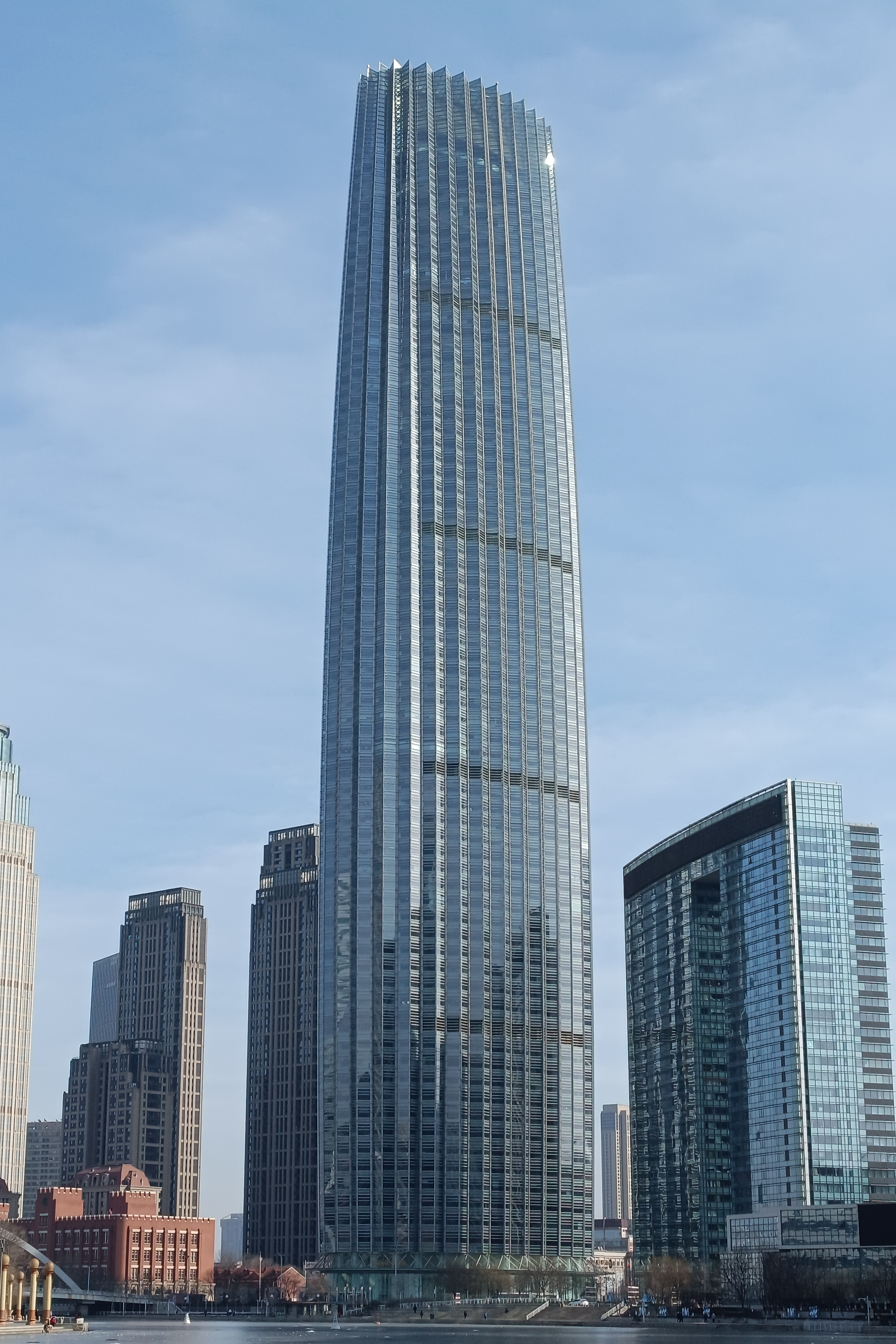
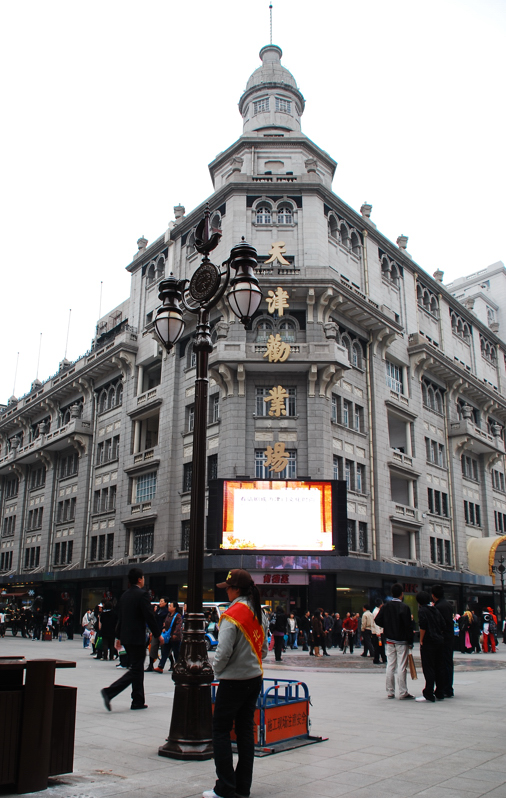
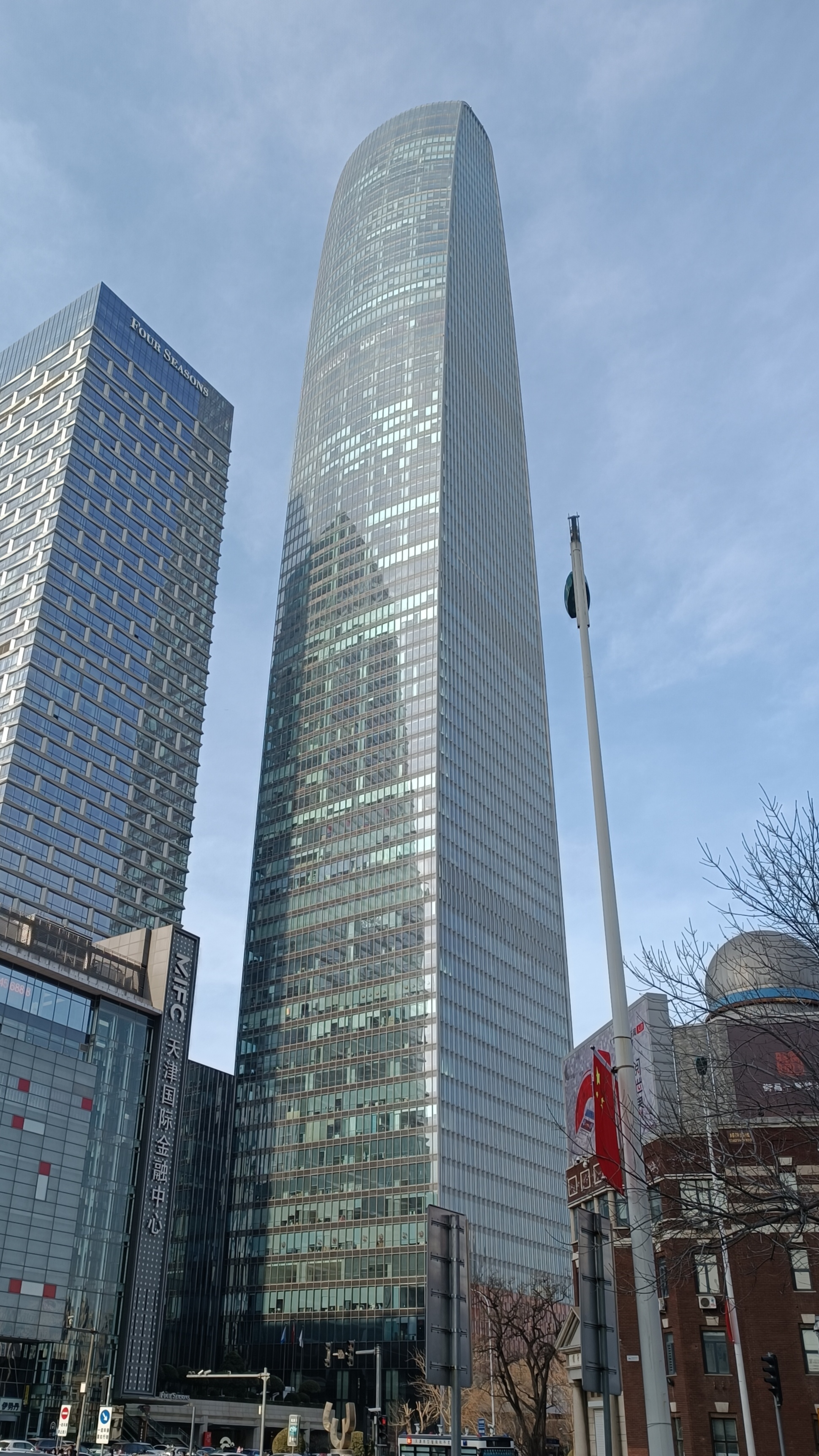
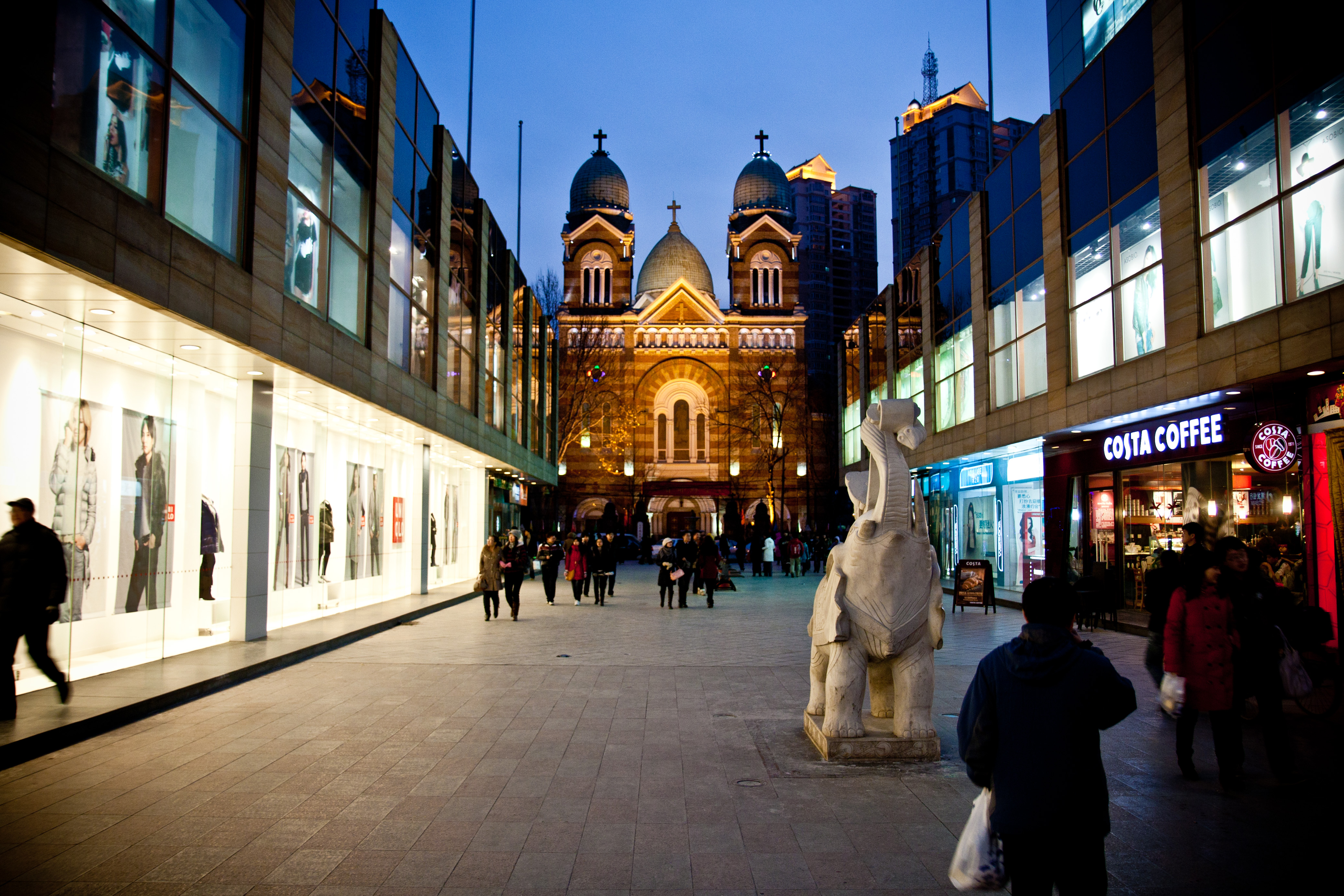
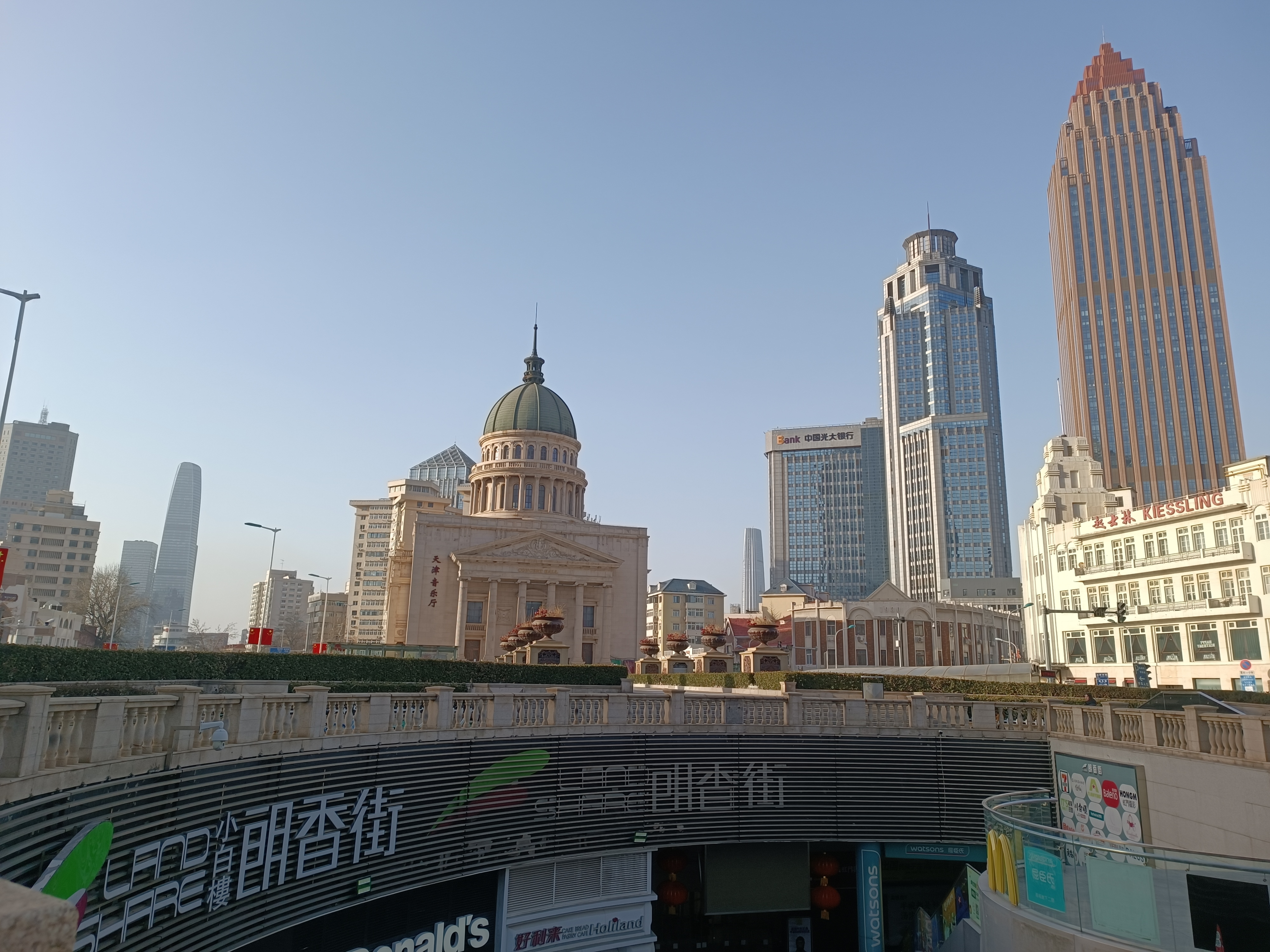
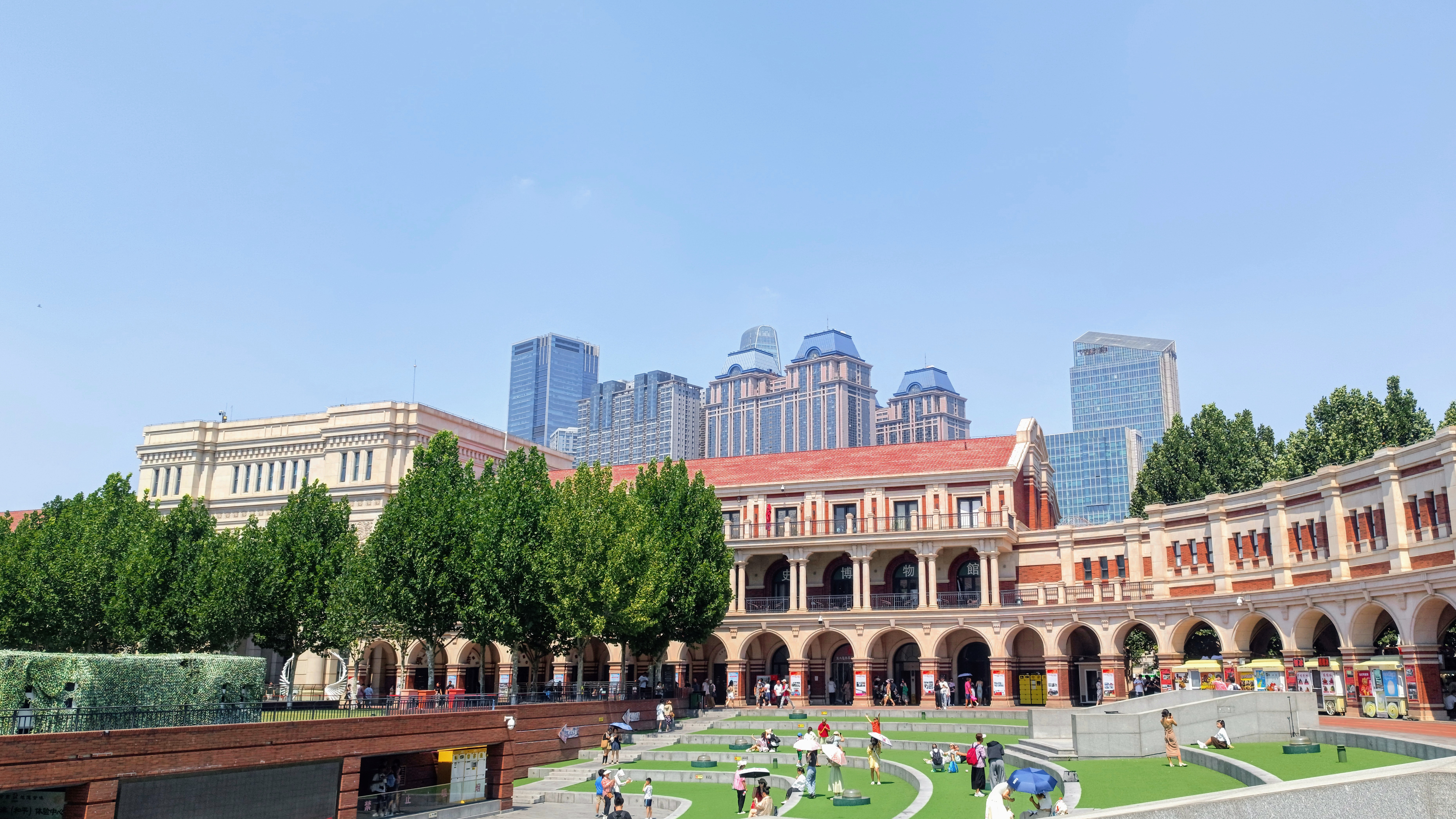
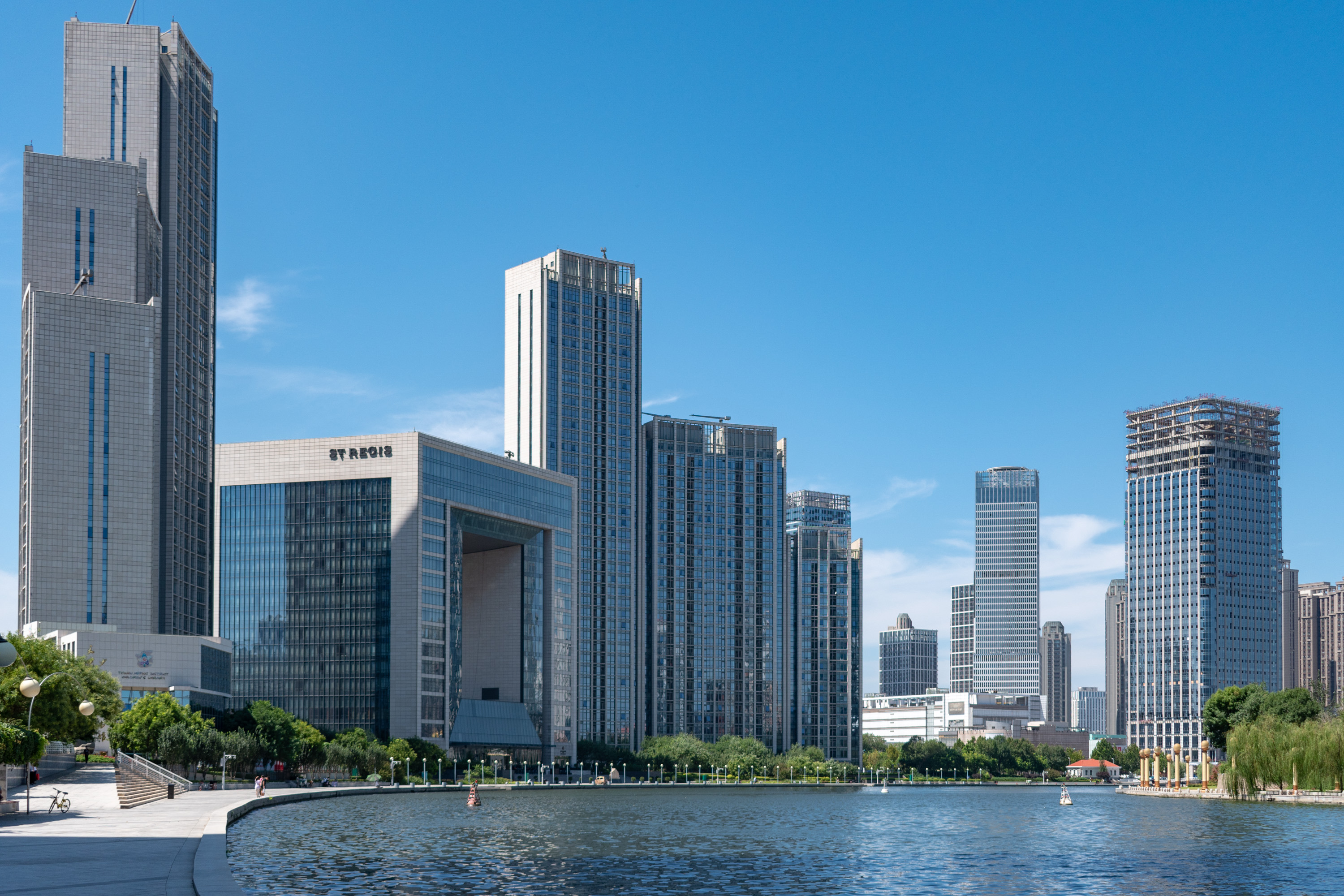
- Interactive map of Heping
- Coordinates: 39°07′01″N 117°11′49″E
- Country: People's Republic of China
- Municipality: Tianjin
- Township-level divisions: 6 subdistricts

Area
  - Total: 9.97 km^{2} (3.85 sq mi)

Population (2020)
  - Total: 449,100
  - Density: 45,000/km^{2} (117,000/sq mi)
- Time zone: UTC+8 (China Standard)
Tianjin districts
Subdivisions of Tianjin
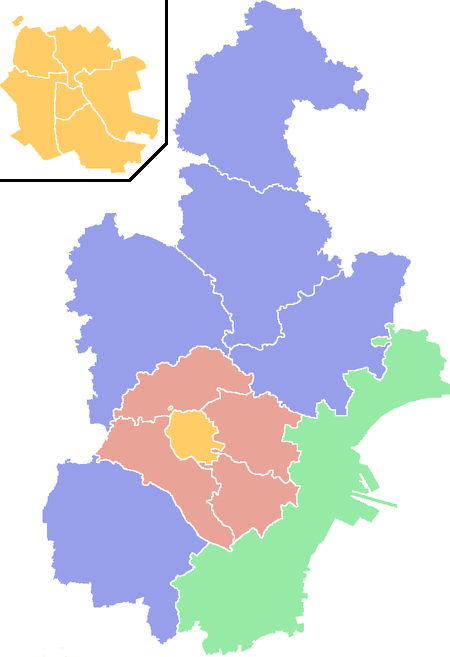
Core districts See inset
1	Heping
2	Hedong
3	Hexi
4	Nankai
5	Hebei
6	Hongqiao
Suburbs
7	Dongli
8	Xiqing
9	Jinnan
10	Beichen
Binhai and Rural
13	Binhai	14	Ninghe
11	Wuqing	15	Jinghai
12	Baodi	16	Ji Zhou
- Website: TJHP.gov.cn

Heping District (simplified Chinese: 和平区; traditional Chinese: 和平區; pinyin: Hépíng Qū; lit. 'Peace District') is a district in the center of Tianjin, China. It is named after the He Ping Road, the most prosperous street of the district at the time of renaming in 1956.

The district has a long history. Its total area is 9.97 km^{2} (3.85 sq mi). There are six subdistricts divided into 88 residential committees (社区居委会). As of 2020, the district has a total population of 449,100.

Heping District has historically been the center of culture, commerce, and finance in Tianjin. The Tianjin CBD, shopping centres, and banks are concentrated in this District.

From 2006 to 2008, the leader of the district is Li Runlan (李润兰).

Yaohua High School is located in the district. All Nippon Airways has its Tianjin Office in Tower 2 of The Exchange in the district.

== History ==
During the Song dynasty, the lands of today's Heping District was under Qingchi count of Cangzhou. Following the Jingkang incident, Qingchi county, along with most of Song territories north of Yellow River was occupied by Jin dynasty. Jin renamed the county as Jinghai in 1193.

In 1730, Jinghai county was combined into Tianjin. Due to its long distance from the originally city center, the district was sparsely populated and underdeveloped. Since 1860, many part of the district was given to Britain, United States, France and Japan as concessions. With the return of the concessions following the end of World War II, former Japanese and French concessions were grouped into the First District, and the former British concessions was changed into the Tenth District. After the founding of People's Republic of China, the District was divided into the First and Fifth Districts on October 10, 1952. On the first day of 1956, the First and Fifth Districts were renamed to Heping (lit. 'Peace') District and Xinhua (lit. 'New China') District respectively, and the Xinhua District was later combined into Heping District on September 9, 1958.

== Administrative divisions ==
There are six subdistricts in the district:

Name	Chinese (S)	Hanyu Pinyin	Population (2010)	Area (km^{2})
Xiaobailou Subdistrict	小白楼街道	Xiǎobáilóu Jiēdào	30,982	2.134
Quanyechang Subdistrict	劝业场街道	Quànyèchǎng Jiēdào	59,551	1.737
Wudadao Subdistrict	五大道街道	Wǔdàdào Jiēdào	41,421	1.738
Xinxing Subdistrict	新兴街道	Xīnxīng Jiēdào	60,343	1.77
Nanyingmen Subdistrict	南营门街道	Nányíngmén Jiēdào	47,306	1.25
Nanshi Subdistrict	南市街道	Nánshì Jiēdào	33,874	1.22

== Transportation ==
=== Metro ===
Heping District is currently served by two metro lines operated by Tianjin Metro:

- Line 1 - Xiaobailou, Yingkoudao, Anshandao
- Line 3 - Xikanglu, Yingkoudao, Hepinglu, Jinwan'guangchang

== See also ==
- Yaohua High School
