= Wudadao Subdistrict =

Wudadao Subdistrict 五大道街道
- Subdistrict
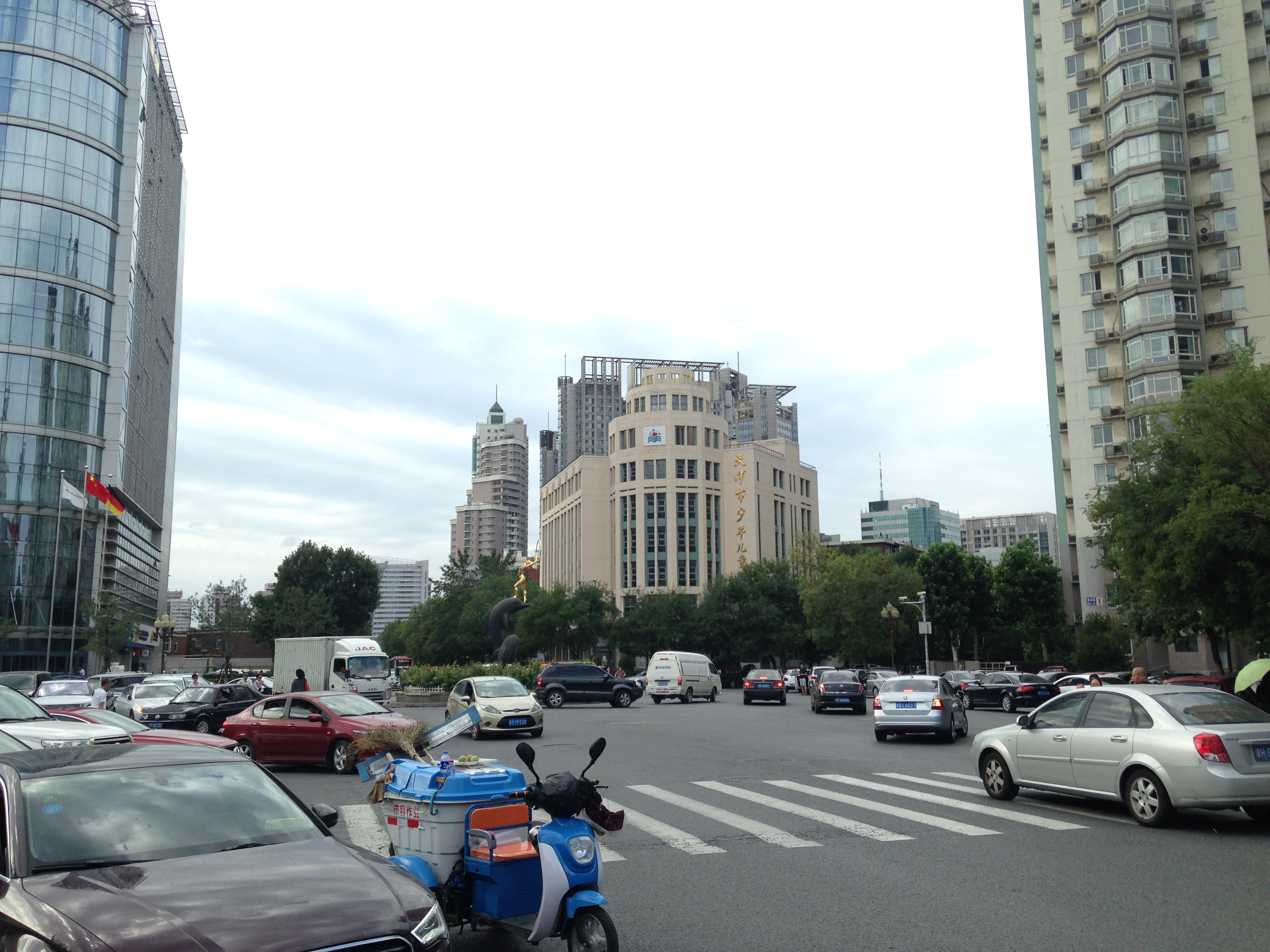
- Intersection near Tianjin City Children's Library, 2016

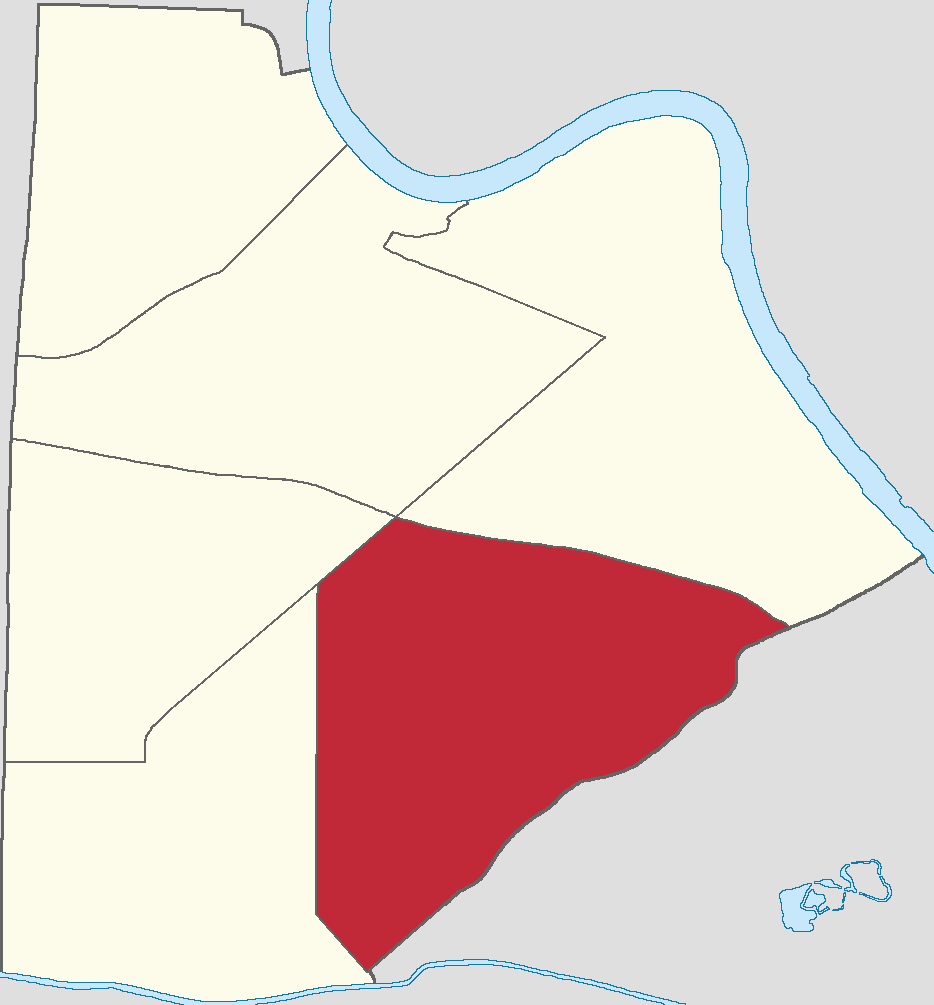
- Location of in Heping District

- Location within Tianjin Location within China
- Coordinates: 39°06′34″N 117°11′40″E
- Country: China
- Municipality: Tianjin
- District: Heping
- Village-level Divisions: 13 communities

Area
  - Total: 1.92 km^{2} (0.74 sq mi)
- Elevation: 9 m (30 ft)

Population (2010)
  - Total: 41,421
  - Density: 21,600/km^{2} (55,900/sq mi)
- Time zone: UTC+8 (China Standard)
- Postal code: 300050
- Area code: 022

Wudadao Subdistrict (Chinese: 五大道街道; pinyin: Wǔdàdào Jiēdào) is a subdistrict on the southeastern side of Heping District, Tianjin. it borders Xiaobailou Subdistrict in its north, Dayingmen and Taoyuan Subdistricts in its southeast, as well as Xinxing and Nanyingmen Subdistricts in its west. In 2010, the census counter 41,521 residents for this subdistrict.

Prior to 2014, this subdistrict was known as Tiyuguan Subdistrict. The current name literally means "Fifth Avenue".

== History ==
Timeline of Wudadao Subdistrict
Year	Status	Under
1952 - 1956		5th District, Tianjin
1956 - 1958	Huangjia Huayuan Subdistrict Changdedao Subdistrict Hanyangdao Subdistrict	Xinhua District, Tianjin
1958 - 1960	Huangjia Huayuan Subdistrict Changdedao Subdistrict Hanyangdao Subdistrict	Heping District, Tianjin
1960 - 1962	Minayuan People's Commune Tiyuguan People's Commune	Heping District, Tianjin
1962 - 1998	Minyuan Subdistrict Tiyuguan Subdistrict	Heping District, Tianjin
1998 - 2014	Wudadao Subdistirct	Heping District, Tianjin

== Administrative divisions ==
In the year 2021, There were a total of 13 communities under Wudadao Subdistrict. They are listed in the table below:

Subdivision names	Name transliterations
育文坊	Yuwenfang
友谊里	Youyili
文化里	Wenhuali
福林里	Fulinli
尚友里	Shangyouli
泰来里	Tailaili
湖南路	Hunanlu
澳门路	Aomenlu
三盛里	Sanshengli
安乐村	Anlecun
国际公寓第一	Guoji Gongyu Diyi
华荫南里	Huayin Nanli
国际公寓第二	Guoji Gongyu Di'er

== Gallery ==
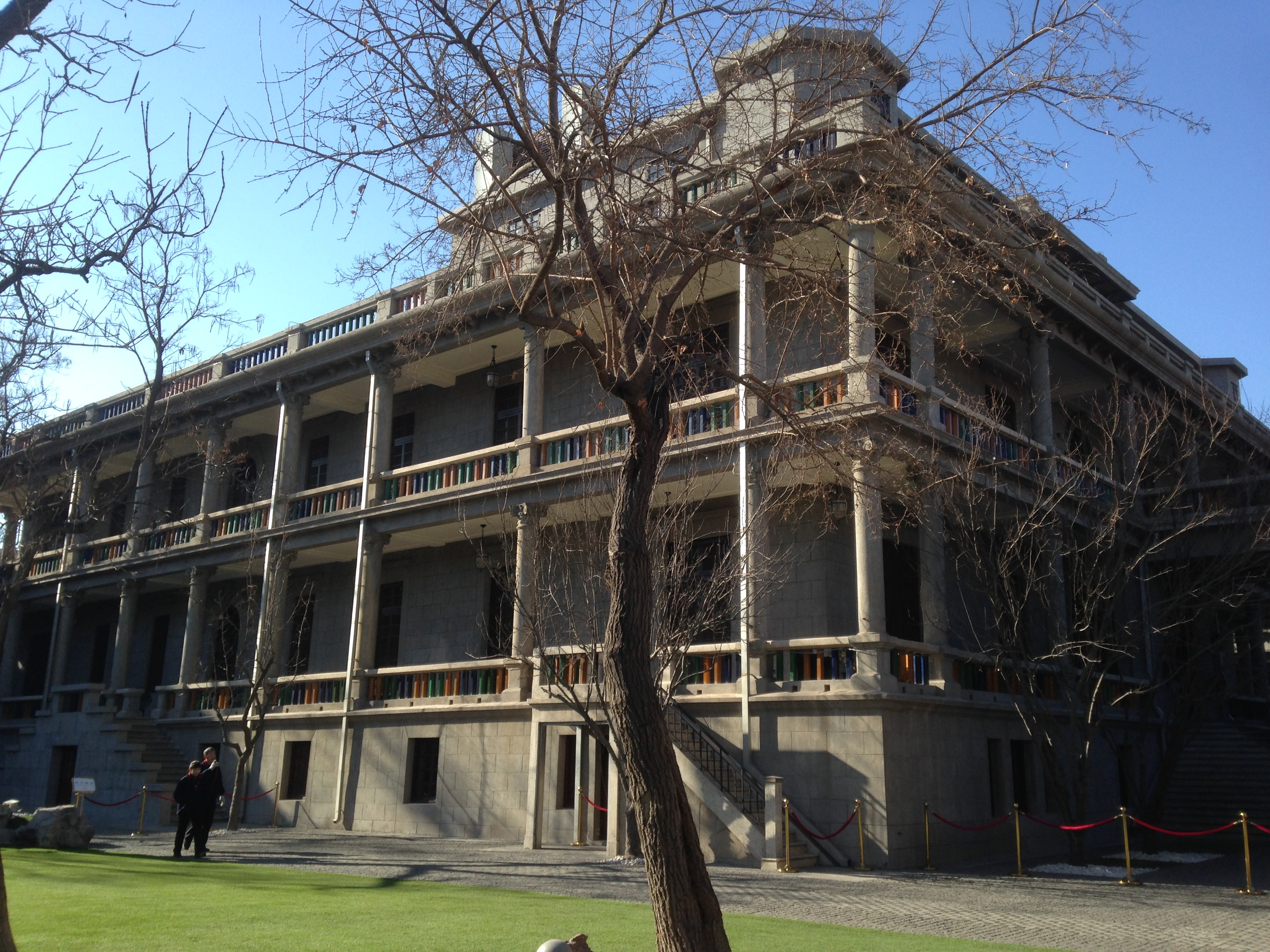
Former Residence of Prince Qing, 2014

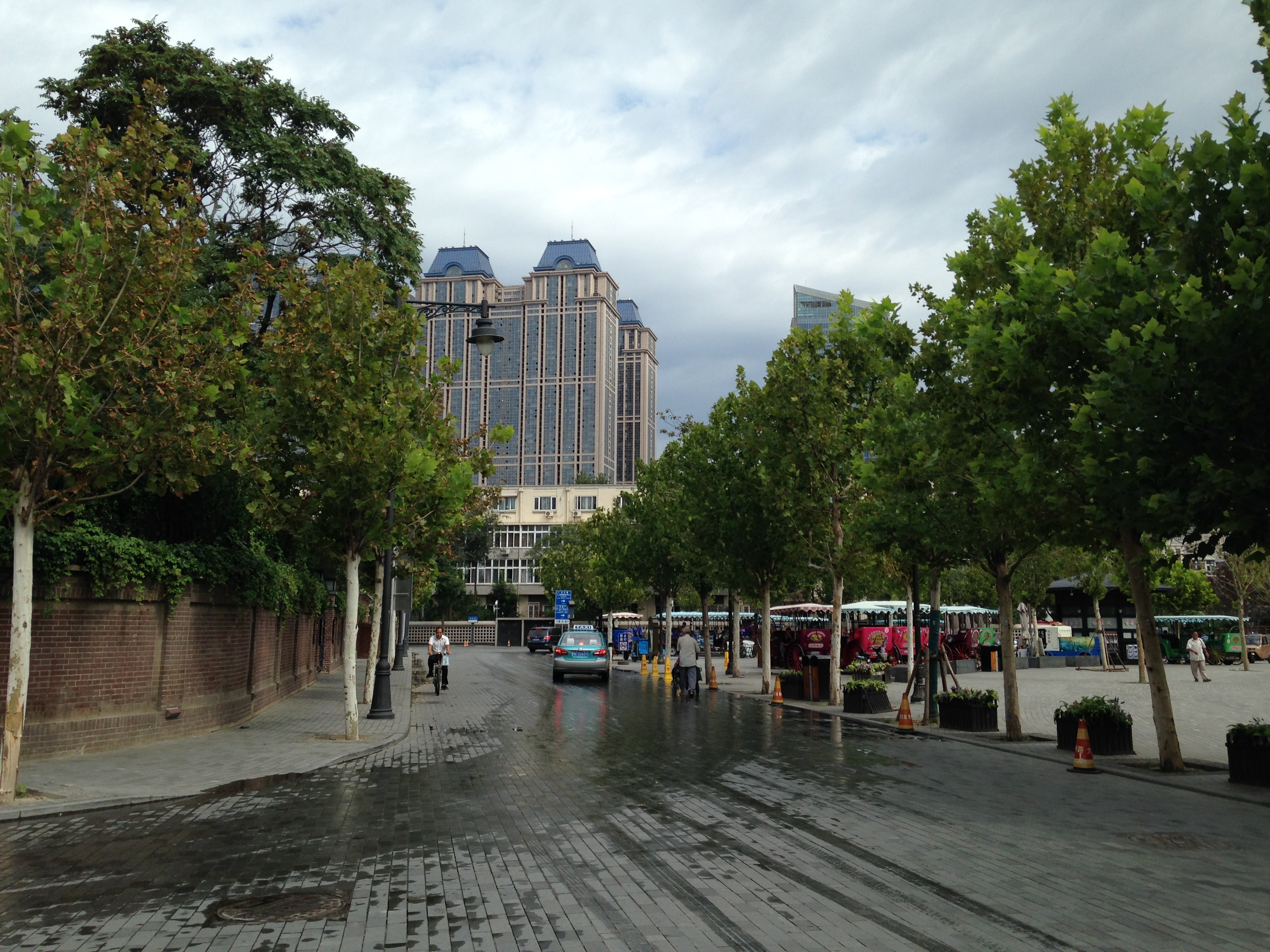
Hengyang Road near Minyuan Stadium, 2016
