= Quanyechang Subdistrict =

Quanyechang Subdistrict 劝业场街道
- Subdistrict
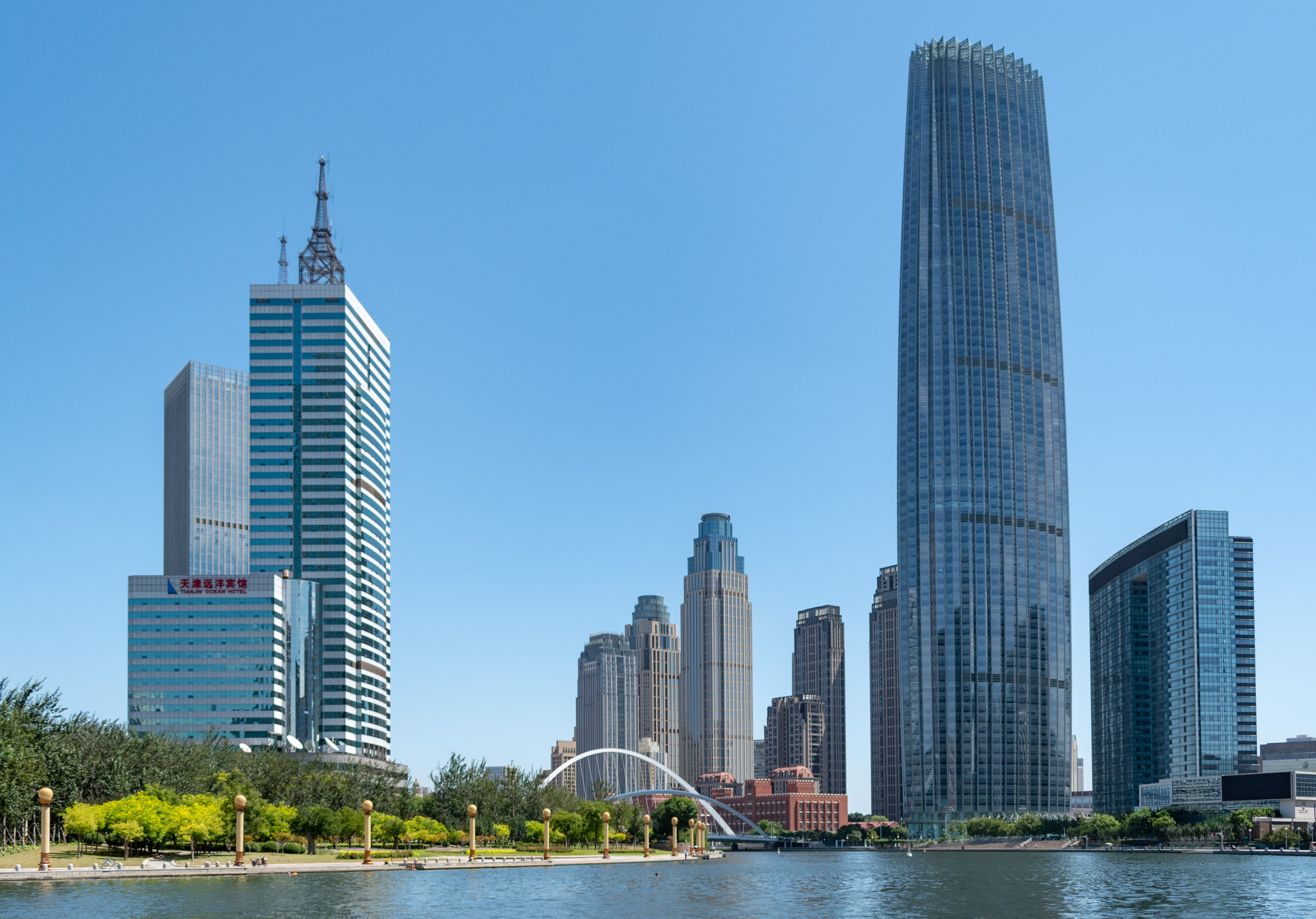
- West bank of Hai River. 2018

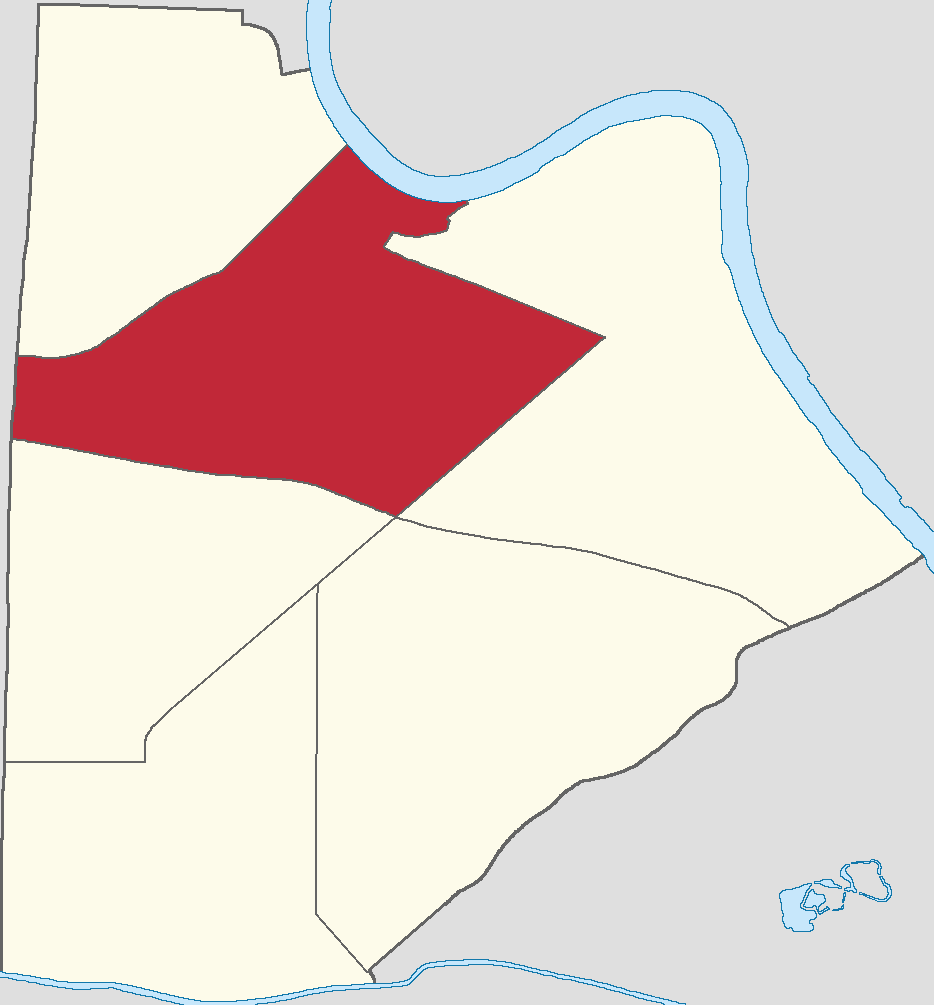
- Location of Quanyechang Subdistrict in Heping District

- Location within Tianjin Location within China
- Coordinates: 39°07′21″N 117°11′43″E
- Country: China
- Municipality: Tianjin
- District: Heping
- Village-level Divisions: 12 communities

Area
  - Total: 1.77 km^{2} (0.68 sq mi)
- Elevation: 8 m (26 ft)

Population (2010)
  - Total: 59,551
  - Density: 33,600/km^{2} (87,100/sq mi)
- Time zone: UTC+8 (China Standard)
- Postal code: 300041
- Area code: 022

Quanyechang Subdistrict (simplified Chinese: 劝业场街道; traditional Chinese: 勸業場街道; pinyin: Quànyèchǎng Jiēdào) is a subdistrict located within Heping District, Tianjin. it shares border with Guangfudao Subdistrict in its north, Xiaobailou Subdistrict in its east, Nanyingmen Subdistrict in its south, as well as Xingnan and Nanshi Subdistricts in its west. In 2010, it had a total population of 59,551.

The subdistrict was named after Quanyechang Shopping Center, which has been operating continuously since 1928.

== History ==
Timeline of Quanyechang's History
Year	Status	Within
1952 - 1955	11 Street Offices	1st District, Tianjin
1955 - 1956	11 Subdistricts	1st District, Tianjin
1956 - 1958	Gansu Road Subdistrict Quanyechang Subdistrict Binjiangdao Subdistrict Nenjiang Road Subdistrict Menggu Road Subdistrict	Heping District, Tianjin
1958 - 1960	Gansu Road Subdistrict Quanyechang Subdistrict	Heping District, Tianjin
1960 - 1962	Gansu Road People's Commune Quanyechang People's Commune	Heping District, Tianjin
1962 - 1998	Gansu Road Subdistrict Simianzhong Subdistrict Quanyechang Subdistrict	Heping District, Tianjin
1998–present	Quanyechang Subdistrict	Heping District, Tianjin

== Administrative divisions ==
In 2021, Quanyechang Subdistrict consisted of 12 communities.They are, by the order of their Administrative Division Codes:

Subdivision names	Name transliterations
花园路	Huayuanlu
滨西	Binxi
兆丰路	Zhaofenglu
林泉	Linquan
新疆路	Xinjianglu
南京路	Nanjinglu
宁夏路	Ningxialu
福明	Fuming
百货大楼	Baihuo Dalou
新津	Xinjin
蒙古路	Menggulu
静园	Jingyuan

== Gallery ==
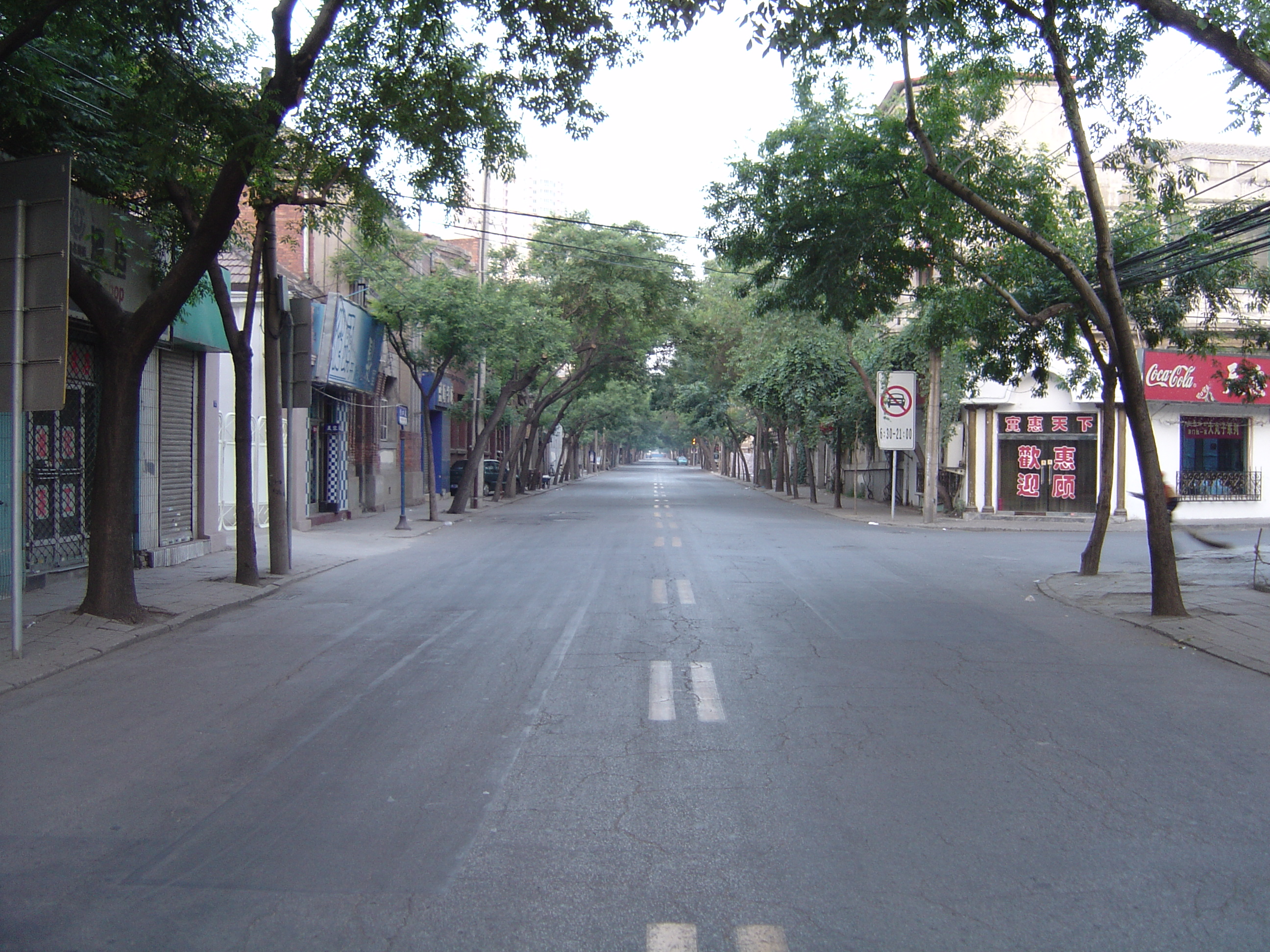
Jinjie Street within the subdistrict, 2004

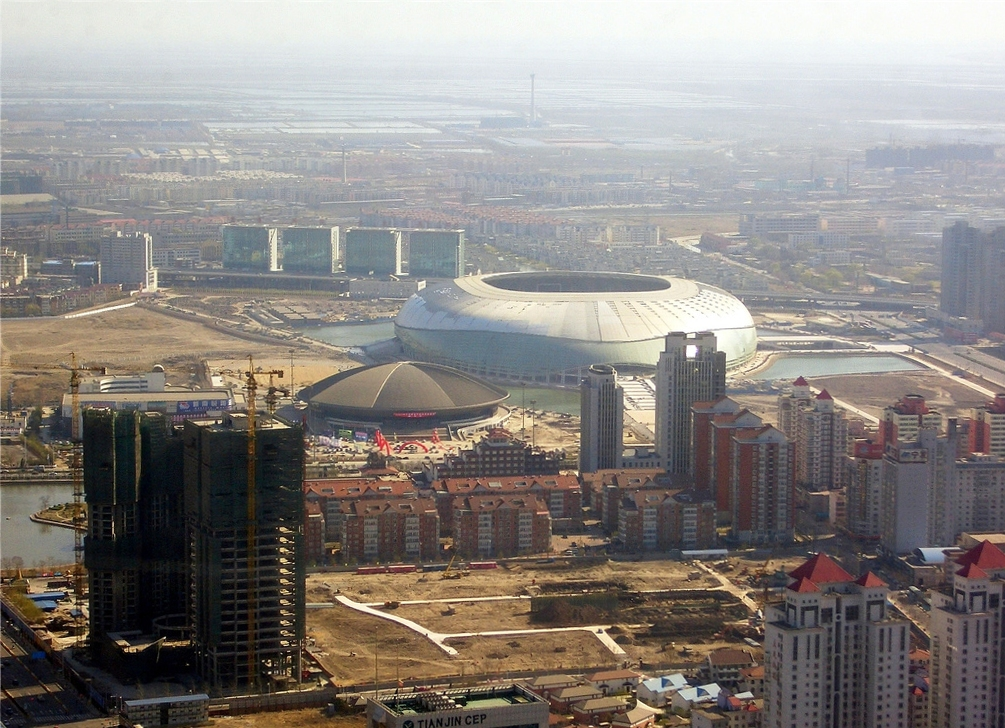
Tianjin Olympic Center Stadium, 2007

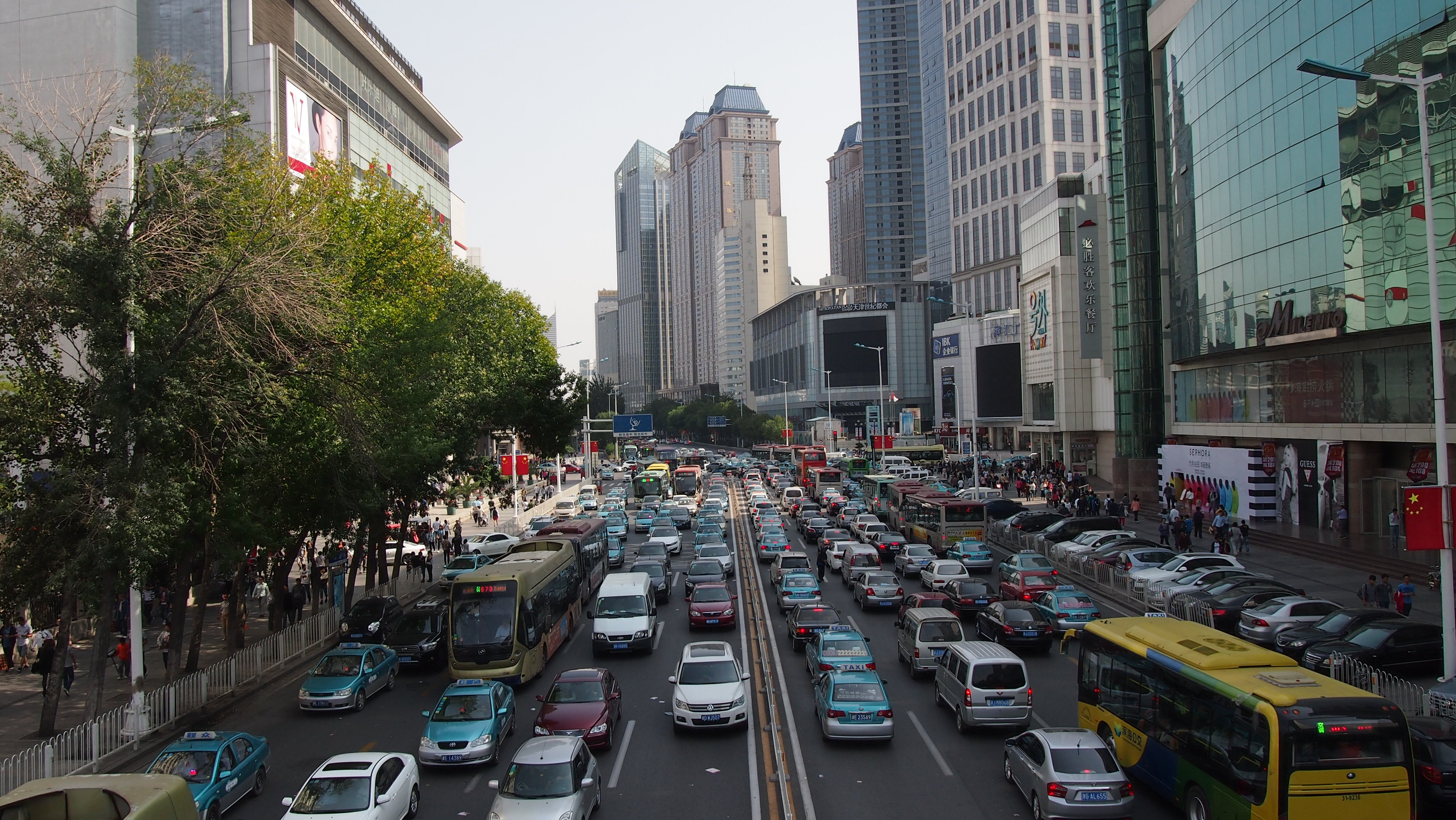
Nanjing Road on the south of the subdistrict, 2012

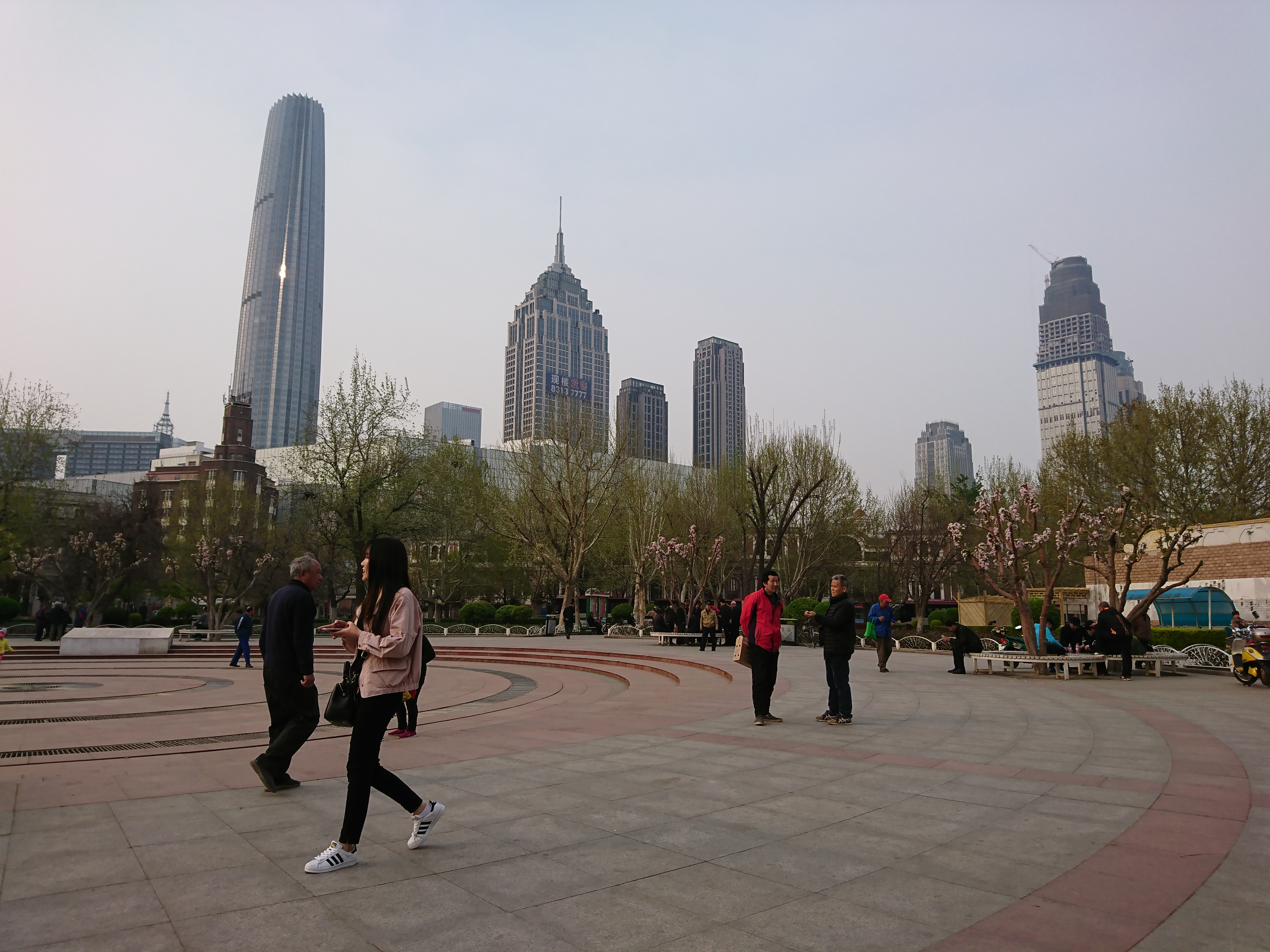
Tianjin World Financial Center, 2017
