= Xuefu Subdistrict =

Xuefu Subdistrict 学府街道
- Subdistrict
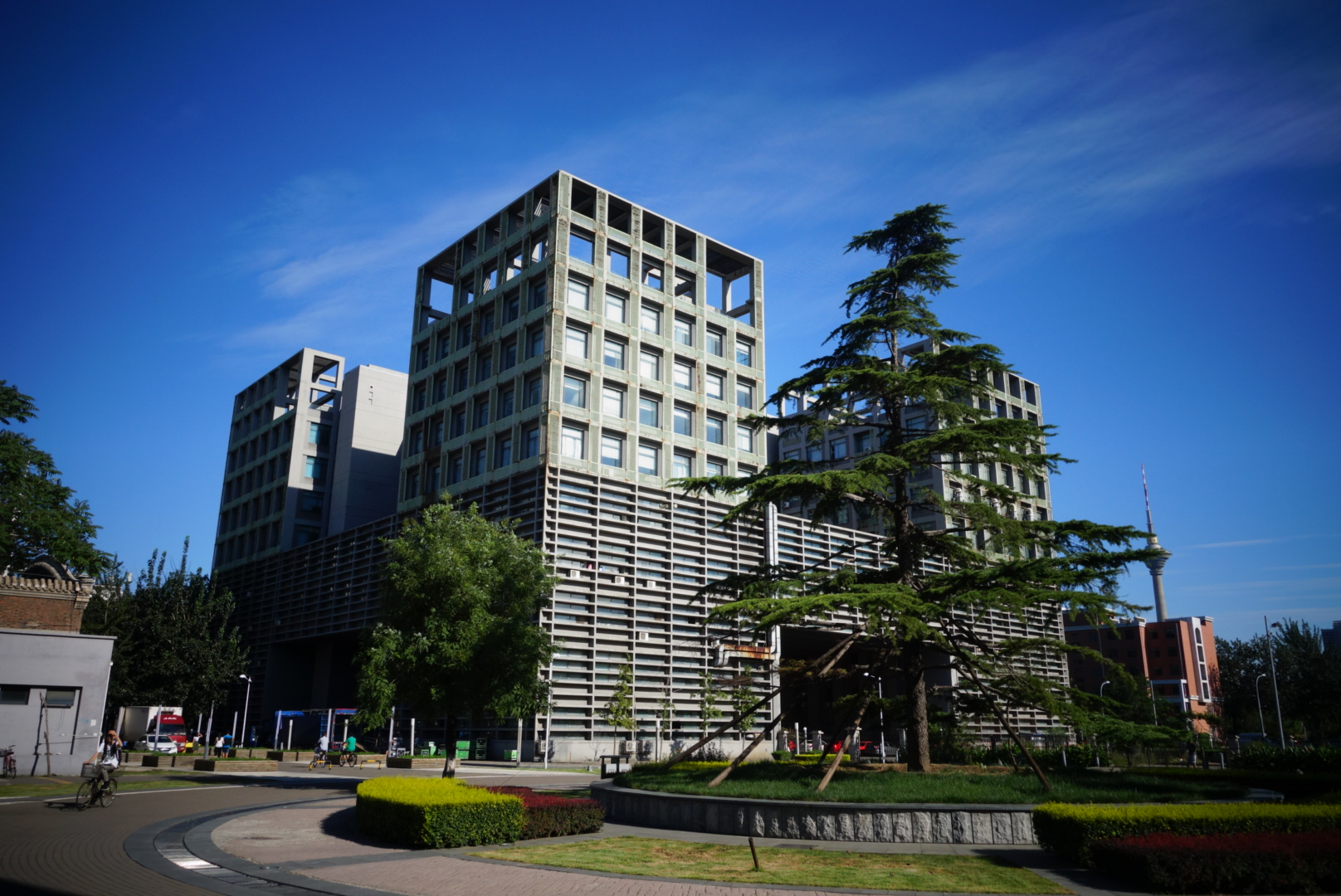
- United Research Building of Tianjin University and Nankai University, 2016

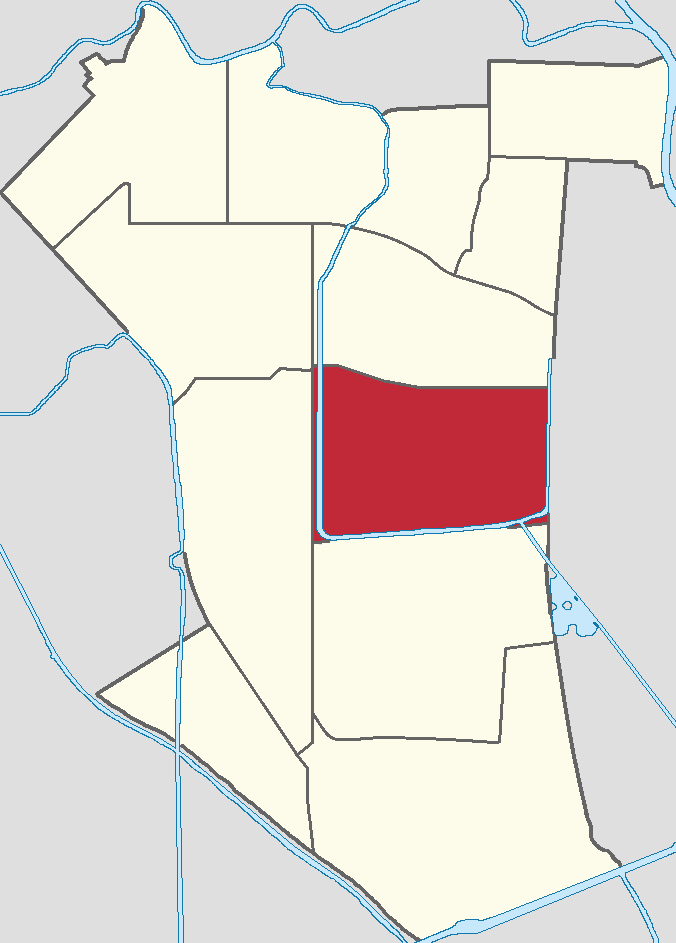
- Location inside of Nankai District

- Location within Tianjin Location within China
- Coordinates: 39°06′42″N 117°09′35″E
- Country: China
- Municipality: Tianjin
- District: Nankai
- Village-level Divisions: 14 communities

Area
  - Total: 4.35 km^{2} (1.68 sq mi)
- Elevation: 8 m (26 ft)

Population (2010)
  - Total: 103,319
  - Density: 23,800/km^{2} (61,500/sq mi)
- Time zone: UTC+8 (China Standard)
- Postal code: 300192
- Area code: 022

Xuefu Subdistrict (simplified Chinese: 学府街道; traditional Chinese: 學府街道; pinyin: Xuéfǔ Jiēdào) is a subdistrict located in the eastern portion of Nankai District, Tianjin, China. It borders Wanxing Subdistrict in the north, Nanyingmen and Xinxing Subdistricts in the east, Machang Subdistrict in the southeast, Shuishanggongyuan Subdistrict in the south, as well as Wangdingdi and Jialing Avenue Subdistricts in the west. In 2010, its total population was 103-319.

This subdistrict was created in 1989 from the former Balitai and part of Xingyeli Subdistricts. It is named Xuefu (Chinese: 学府; lit. 'Academic Institution') for the famous Tianjin University and Nankai University within the subdistrict.

== Geography ==
Xuefu subdistrict is bounded by Jin River on the west, Fukang River on the south, and Weijin River on the east.

== Administrative divisions ==
In 2021, Xuefu Subdistrict was subdivided into 14 residential communities. They can be seen in the following table:

Subdivision names	Name transliterations
学湖里	Xuehuli
府湖里	Fuhuli
照湖里	Zhaohuli
风湖里	Fenghuli
美湖里	Meihuli
龙兴里	Longxingli
月环里	Yuehuanli
荣迁西里	Rongqian Xili
航天北里	Hangtian Beili
南大西南二	Nanda Xinan Er
南大西南一	Nanda Xinan Yi
天大六村	Tianda Liucun
天大四季村	Tianda Sijicun
新园村	Xinyuancun

== Gallery ==
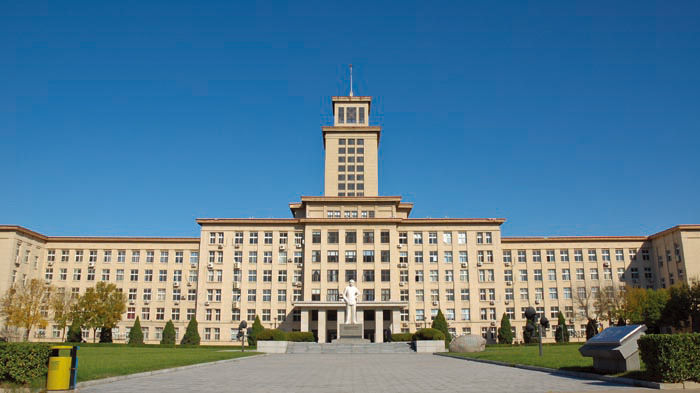
Main building of Nankai University, 2010

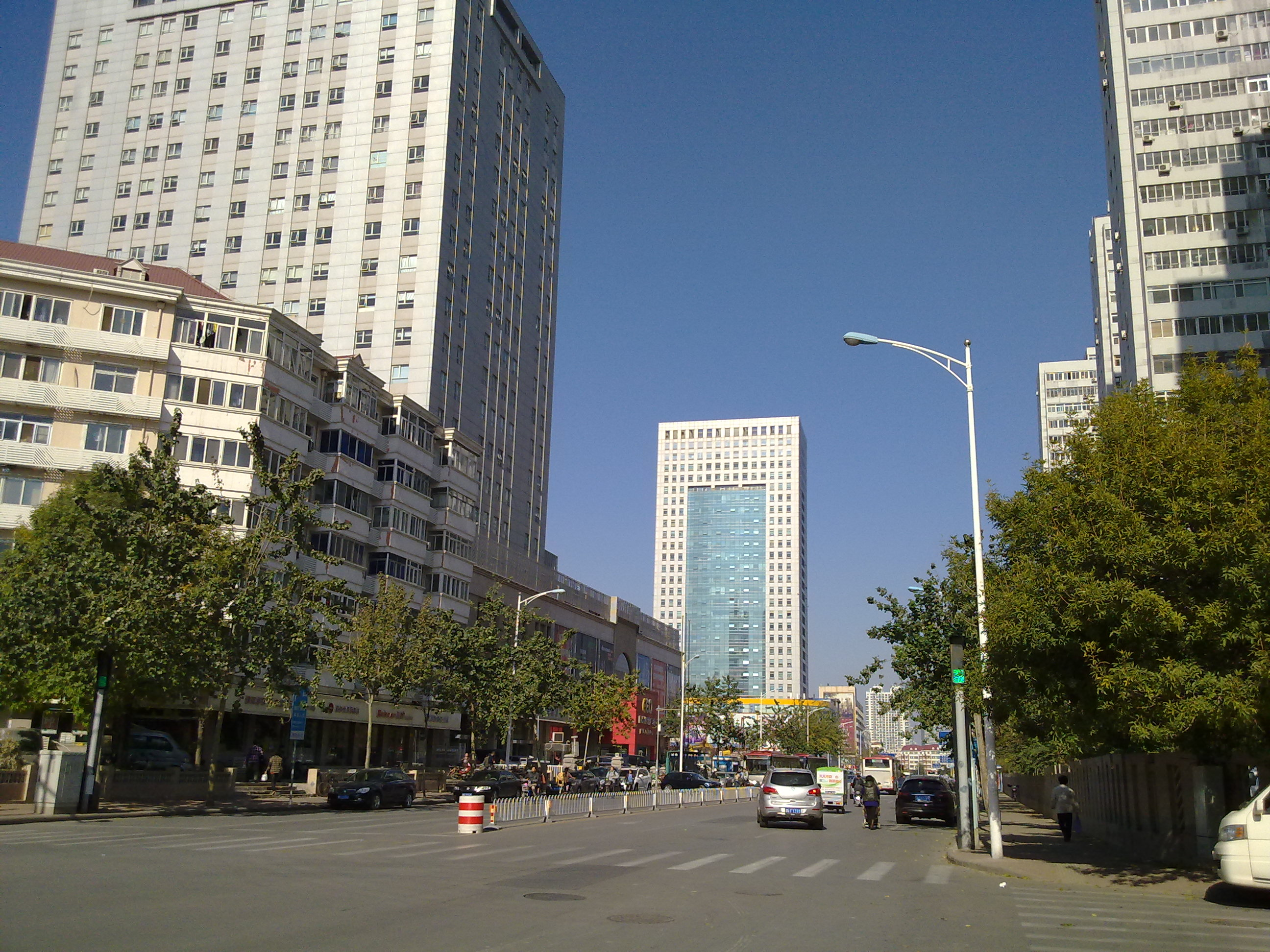
Intersection of Baidi Road and Hujing Avenue, 2013

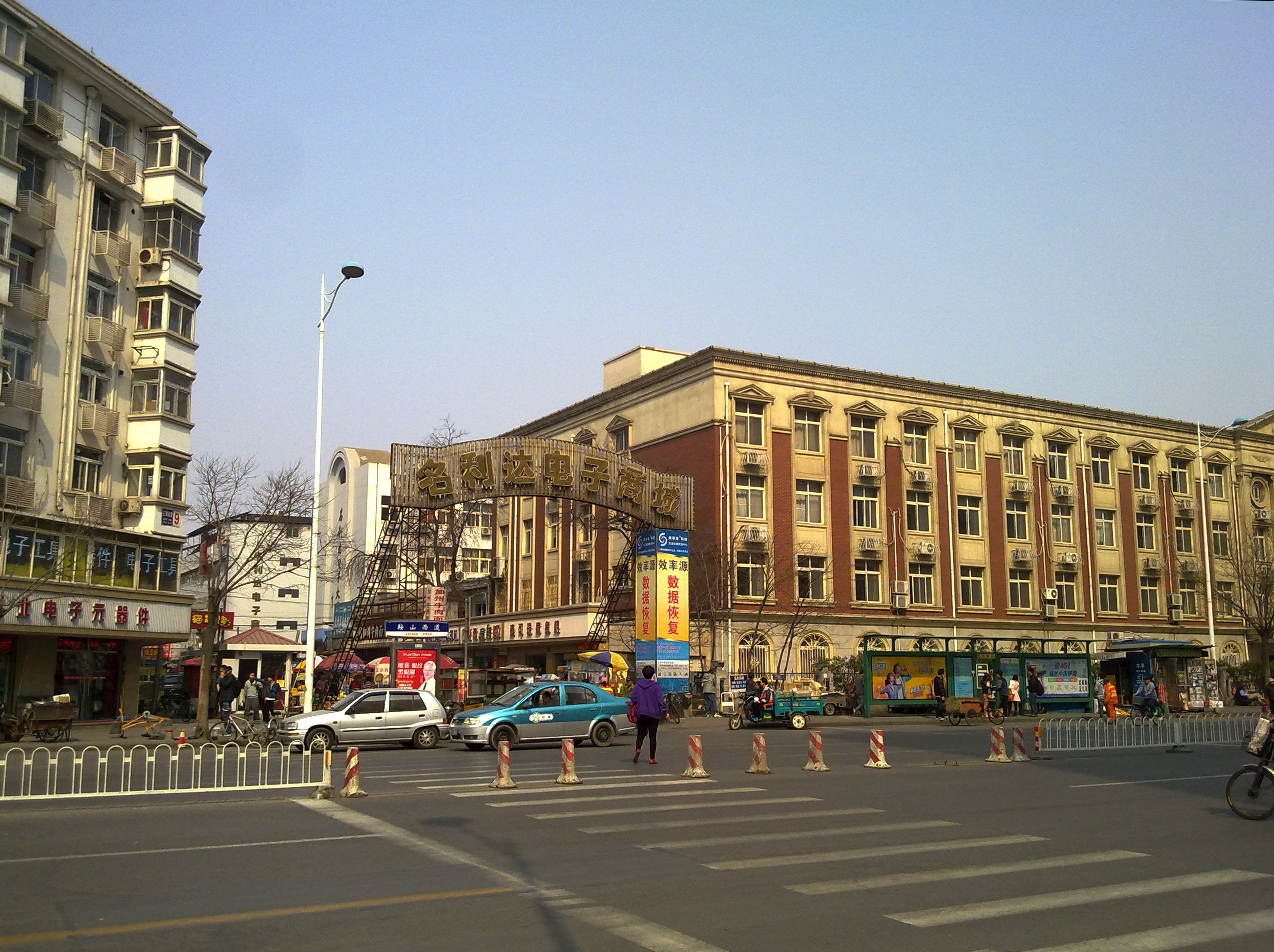
Entrance of Minglida Electronic Market, 2014

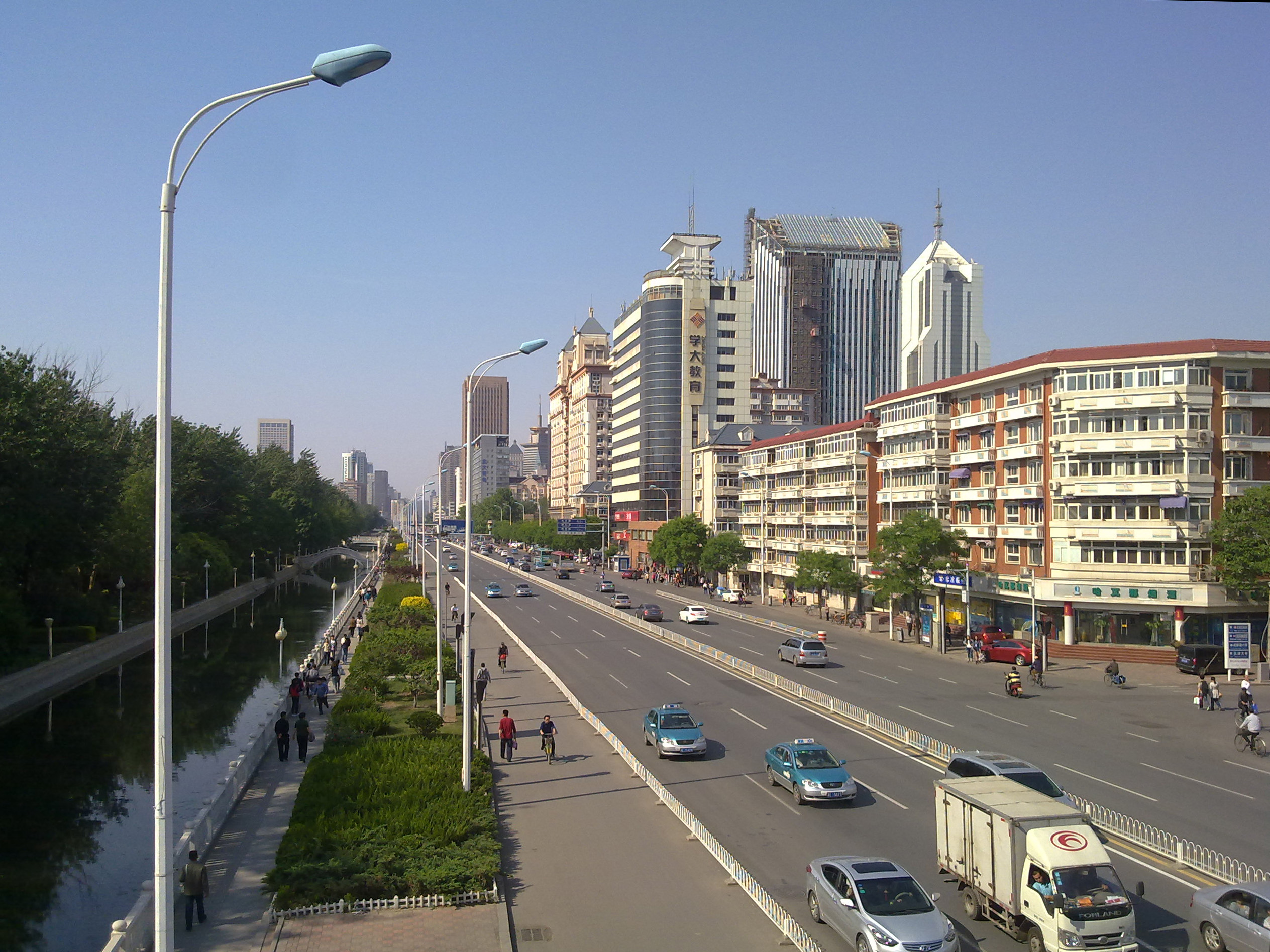
Weijin River and Weijin Road on the east of the subdistrict, 2014
