= Youyi Road Subdistrict, Tianjin =

Youyi Road Subdistrict 友谊路街道
- Subdistrict
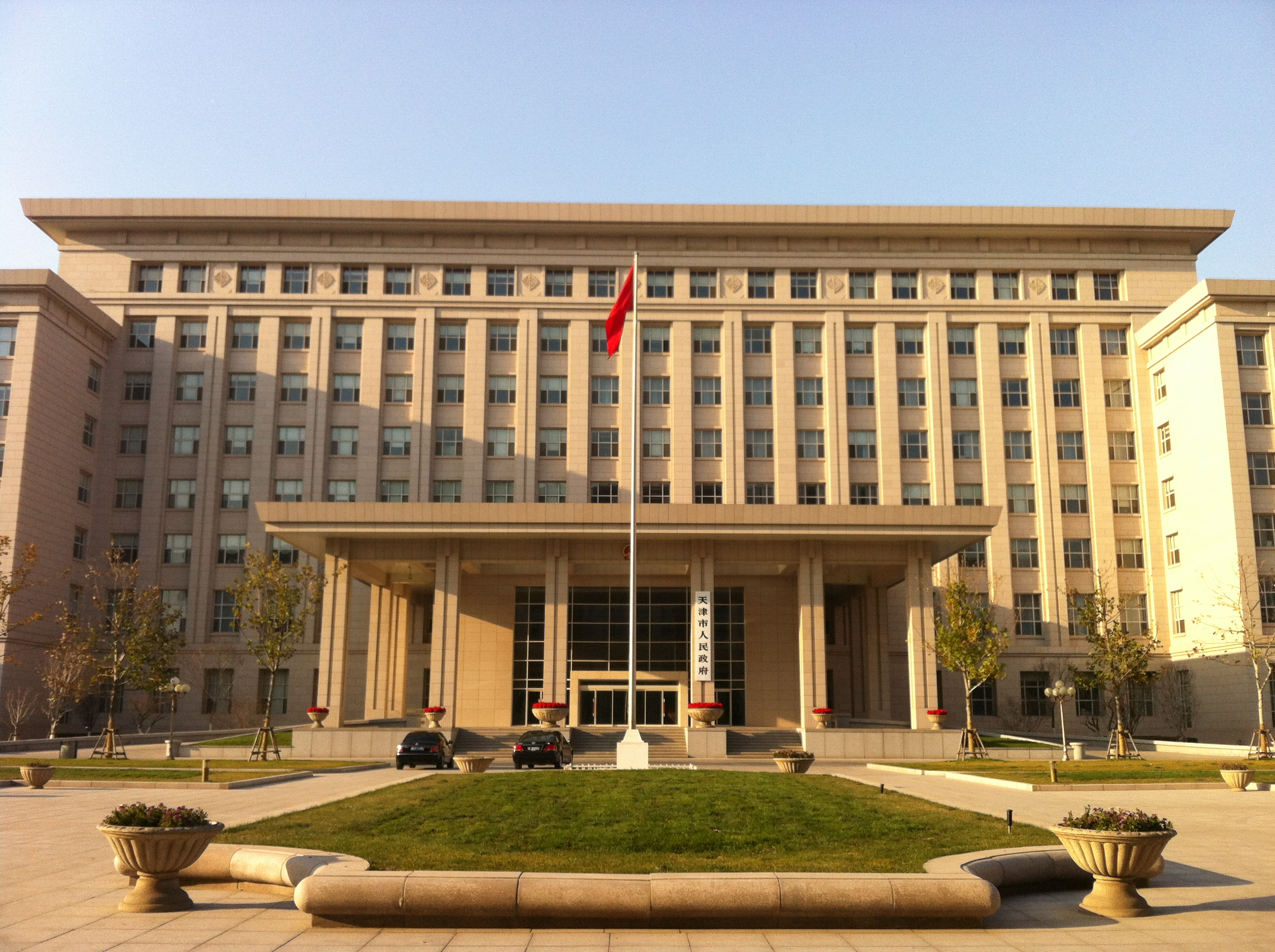
- Headquarter of Tianjin People's Government on the north of the subdistrict, 2011

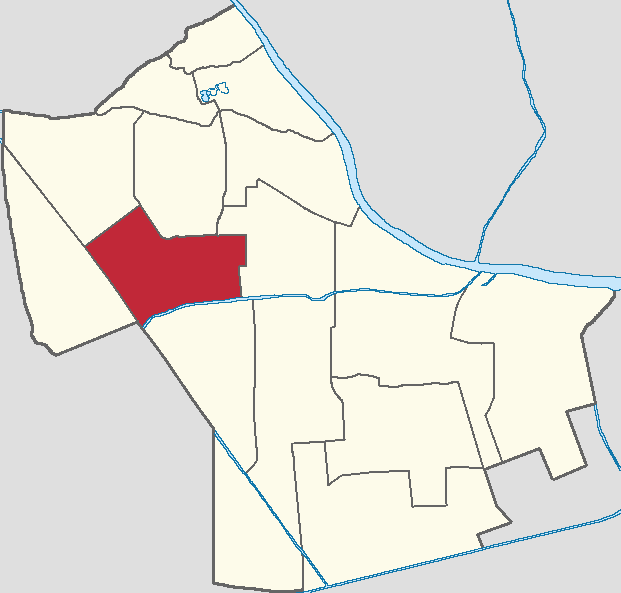
- Location within Hexi District

- Location within Tianjin Location within China
- Coordinates: 39°04′36″N 117°11′52″E
- Country: China
- Municipality: Tianjin
- District: Hexi
- Village-level Divisions: 13 communities

Area
  - Total: 2.8 km^{2} (1.1 sq mi)
- Elevation: 7 m (23 ft)

Population (2010)
  - Total: 77,883
  - Density: 28,000/km^{2} (72,000/sq mi)
- Time zone: UTC+8 (China Standard)
- Postal code: 300200
- Area code: 022

Youyi Road Subdistrict (simplified Chinese: 友谊路街道; traditional Chinese: 友誼路街道; pinyin: Yǒuyìlù Jiēdào) is a subdistrict located on western Hexi District, Tianjin, China. It is located to the south of Yuexiu Road and Machang Subdistricts, west of Jianshan Subdistrict, north of Meijiang Subdistrict, and east of Tianta Subdistrict. According to the 2020 census, it had 77,883 people residing within its borders.

The subdistrict was formed in 1984, and incorporated Heixiucheng Subdistrict in 2000. It was named after Youyi (Chinese: 友谊; lit. 'Friendship') Road that passes through it.

== Geography ==
Youyi Road Subdistrict was bounded by Weijin and Fuxing Rivers to the west and south respectively. Dongnan Banhuan Expressway runs east-west through the subdistrict.

== Administrative divisions ==
In the year 2021, 13 residential communities constituted Youyi Road Subdistrict. They are, by the order of their Administrative Division Codes:

Subdivision names	Name transliterations
寿园里	Shouyuanli
柳江里	Liujiangli
文苑楼	Wenyuanlou
宾西楼	Binxilou
西园西里	Xiyuan Xili
西园南里	Xiyuan Nanli
浏阳里	Liuyangli
纯正里	Chunzhengli
纯皓家园	Chunhao Jiayuan
平江南里	Pingjiang Nanli
文玥里	Wenyueli
谊景村	Yijingcun
谊城公寓	Yicheng Gongyu

== Gallery ==
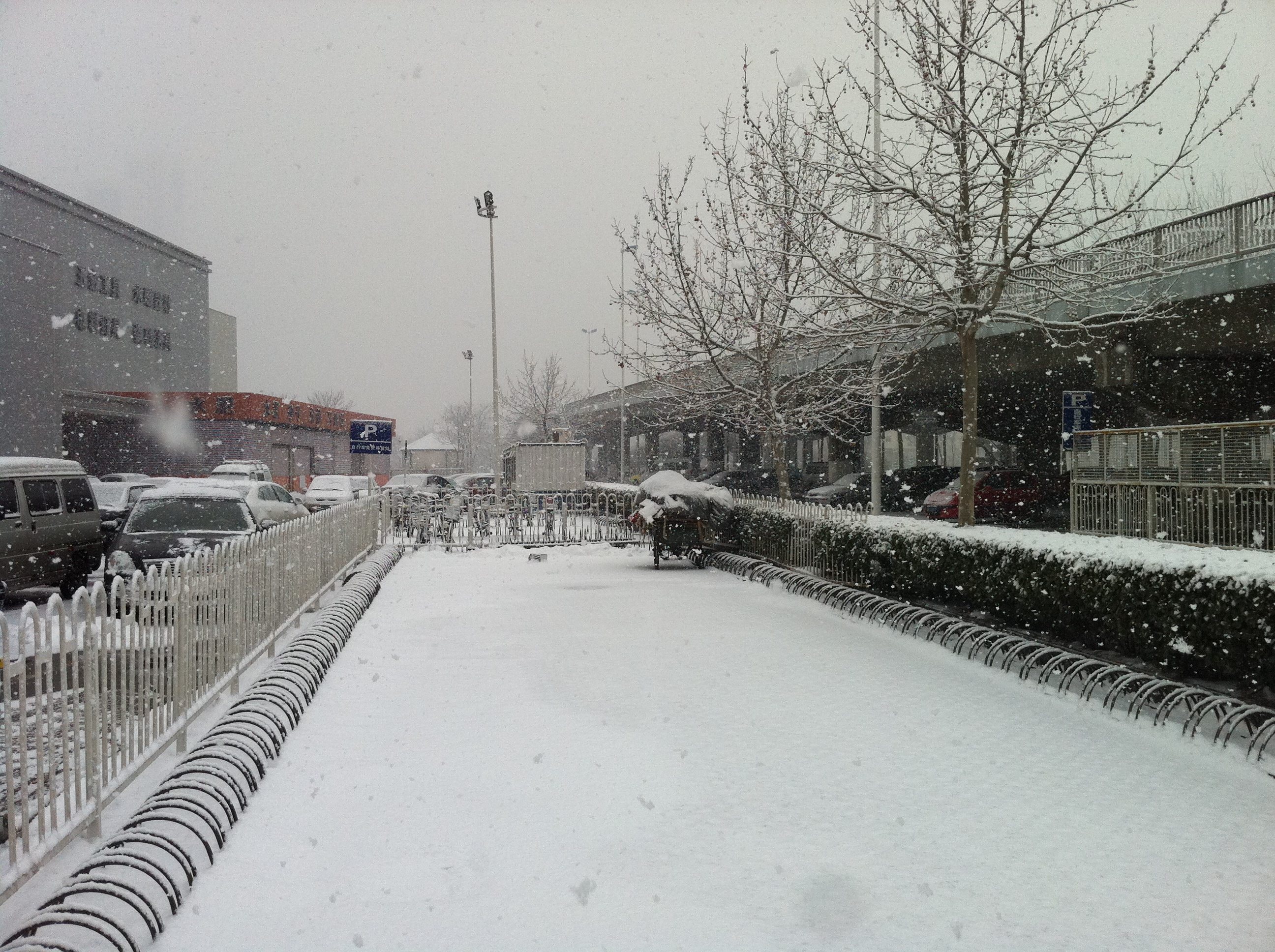
Snowday around Xinye Plaza, 2011

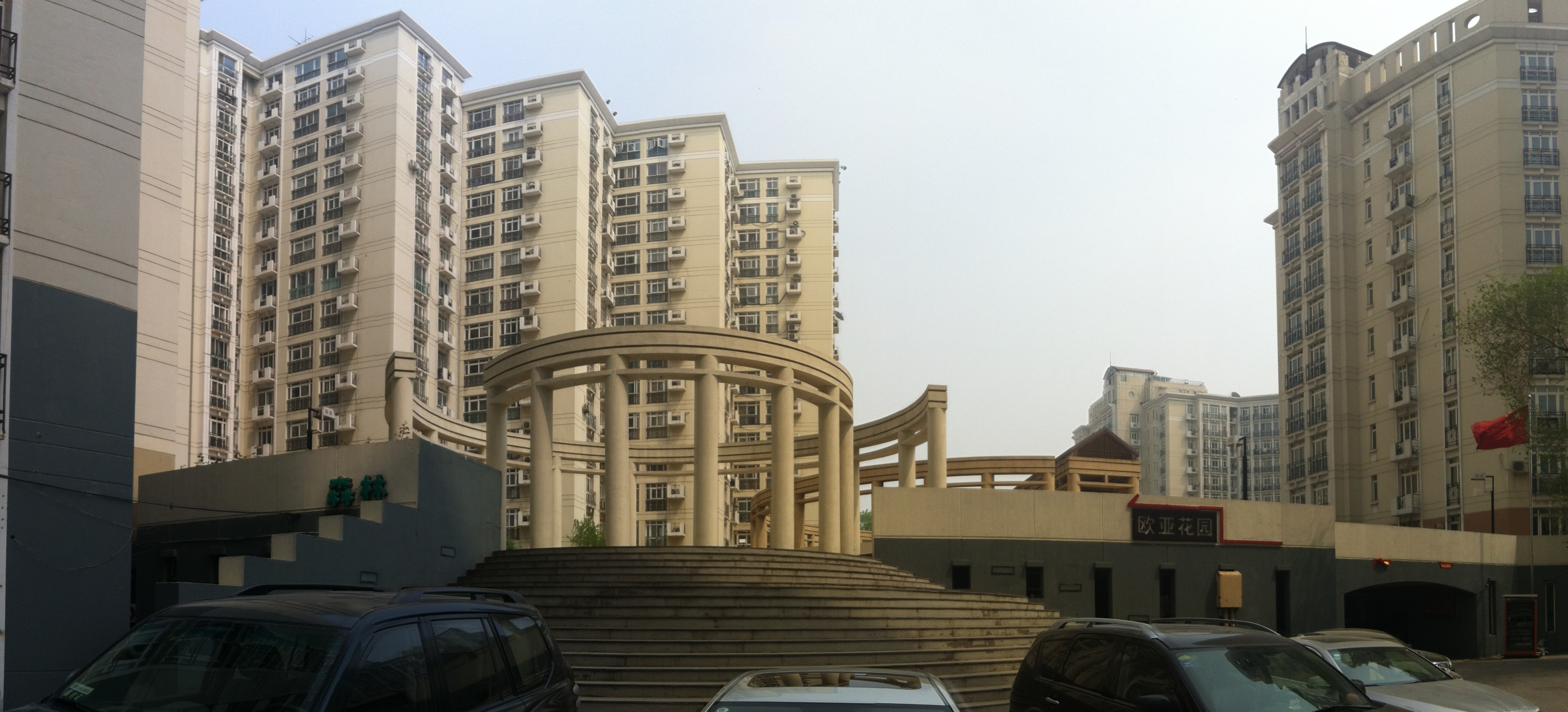
Residential community north of Binguan South Avenue, 2012

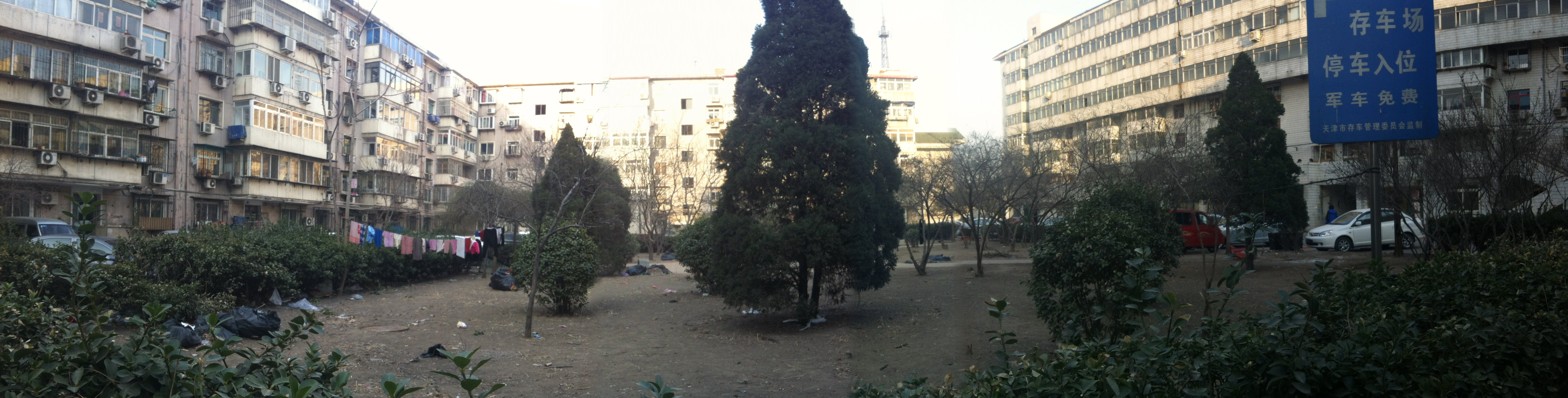
Shouyuanli Microdistrict near Weijin River, 2012

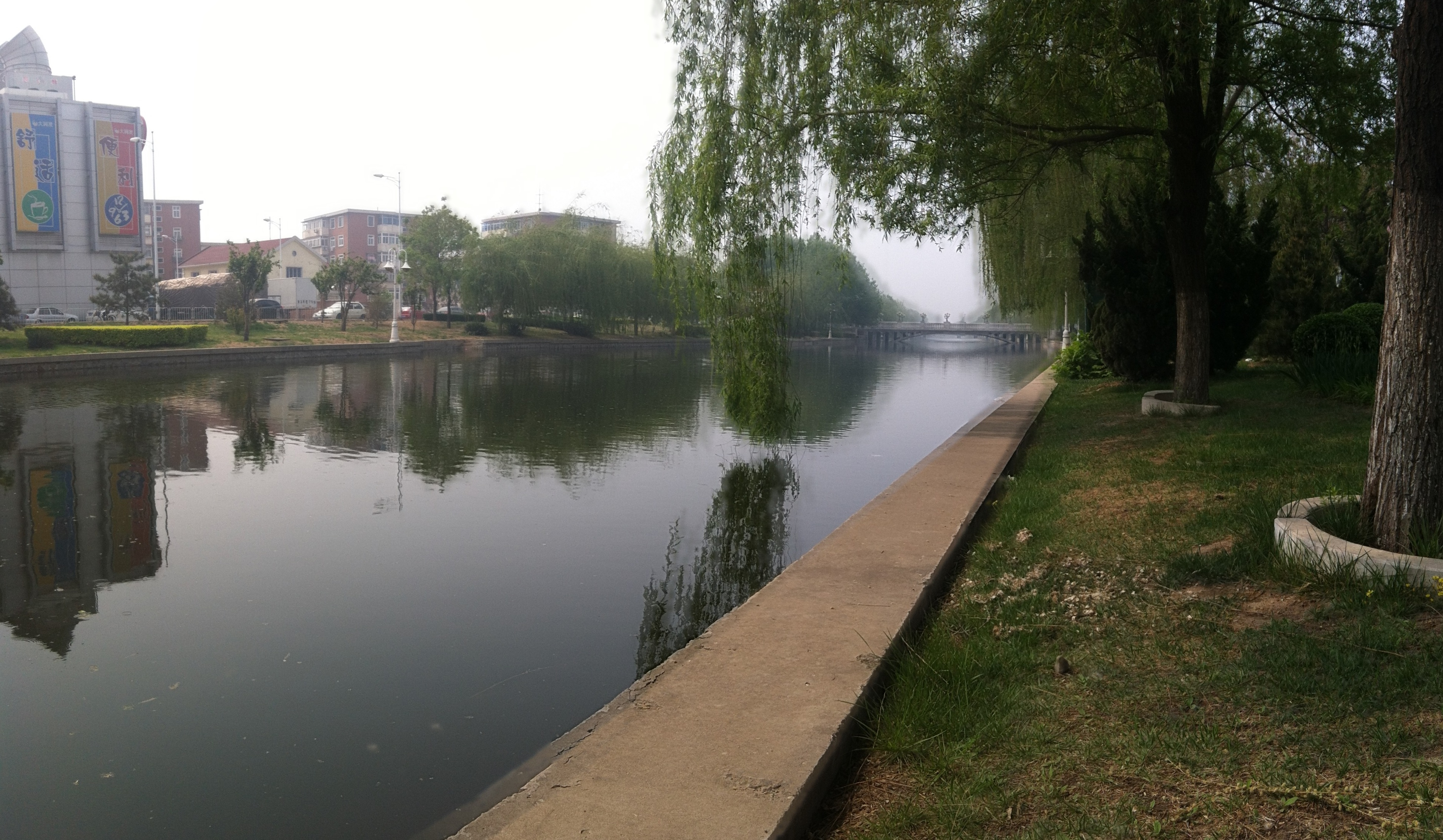
Section of Weijin River on the southwest of the subdistrict, 2012
