= Wanxing Subdistrict =

Wanxing Subdistrict 万兴街道
- Subdistrict
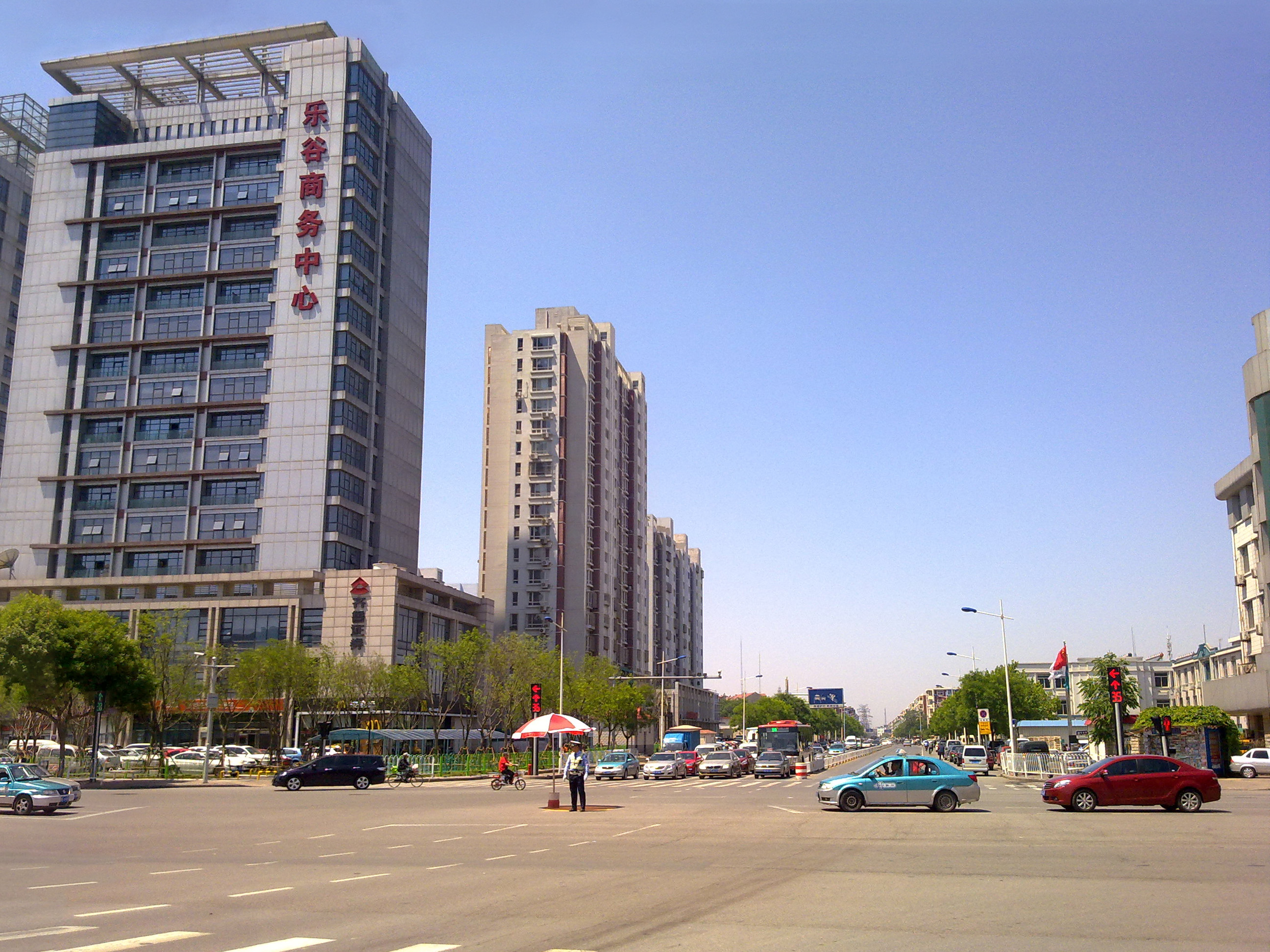
- Intersection of Hongqi Road and Xihu Avenune within the subdistrict, 2014

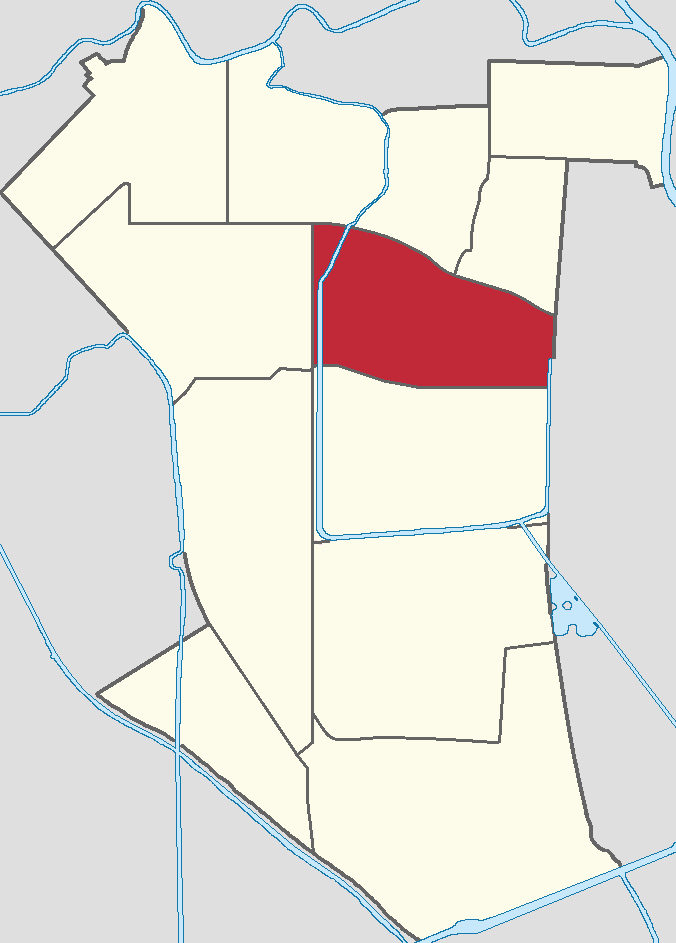
- Location within Nankai District

- Location within Tianjin Location within China
- Coordinates: 39°07′16″N 117°09′29″E
- Country: China
- Municipality: Tianjin
- District: Nankai
- Village-level Divisions: 22 communities

Area
  - Total: 3.41 km^{2} (1.32 sq mi)
- Elevation: 7 m (23 ft)

Population (2010)
  - Total: 140,684
  - Density: 41,300/km^{2} (107,000/sq mi)
- Time zone: UTC+8 (China Standard)
- Postal code: 300193
- Area code: 022

Wanxing Subdistrict (simplified Chinese: 万兴街道; traditional Chinese: 萬興街道; pinyin: Wànxìng Jiēdào) is a subdistrict situated within Nankai District, Tianjin, China. It borders Changhong Subdistrict to the northwest, Guangkai and Xingnan Subdistricts to the north, Nanyingmen Subdistrict to the east, Xuefu Subdistrict to the south, and Jialing Avenue Subdistrict to the west. It had 140,684 residents as of 2010.

Its name Wanxing (Chinese: 万兴; lit. 'Ten Thousand Prosper') is a combination of the first characters of Wandezhuang and Xingyeli, two former subdistricts within the region.

== Geography ==
Wanxing subdistrict is located on the west of Weijin River, and is bypassed by the Jin River on the west.

== History ==
Timetable of Wanxing Subdistrict
Year	Status	Belong to
1954 - 1956	Wandezhuang Subdistrict; Xingyeli Subdistrict	7th District, Tianjin
1956 - 1958	Wandezhuang Subdistrict; Xingyeli Subdistrict	Nankai District, Tianjin
1958 - 1960	Wandezhuang Subdistrict	Nankai District, Tianjin
1960 - 1962	Wandezhuang People's Commune	Nankai District, Tianjin
1962 - 1966	Wandezhuang Subdistrict Xingyeli Subdistrict	Nankai District, Tianjin
1966 - 1968	Wandezhuang Subdistrict Xingyeli Subdistrict	Dongfanghong District, Tianjin
1968 - 1978	Xingyeli Subdistrict	Nankai District, Tianjin
1978 - 1999	Wandezhuang Subdistrict Xingyeli Subdistrict	Nankai District, Tianjin
1999–present	Wanxing Subdistrict	Nankai District, Tianjin

== Administrative divisions ==
As of 2021, Wanxing Subdistrict was formed from 22 residential communities. They are, by the order of their Administrative Division Codes:

Subdivision names	Name transliterations
同富	Tongfu
长江里	Changjiangli
长宁里	Changningli
天环里	Tianhuanli
三潭西里	Santan Xili
华章里	Huazhangli
卧龙	Wolong
三潭东里	Santan Dongli
风荷园	Fengheyuan
金融街	Jinrongjie
兴泰路	Xingtailu
义兴里	Yixingli
南丰里	Nanfengli
龙井里	Longjingli
玉皇里	Yuhuangli
紫云里	Ziyunli
万德	Wande
双峰里	Shuangfengli
玉泉里	Yuquanli
佳音里	Jiayinli
天大北五村	Tiandabei Wucun
苏堤路	Wudilu

== Gallery ==
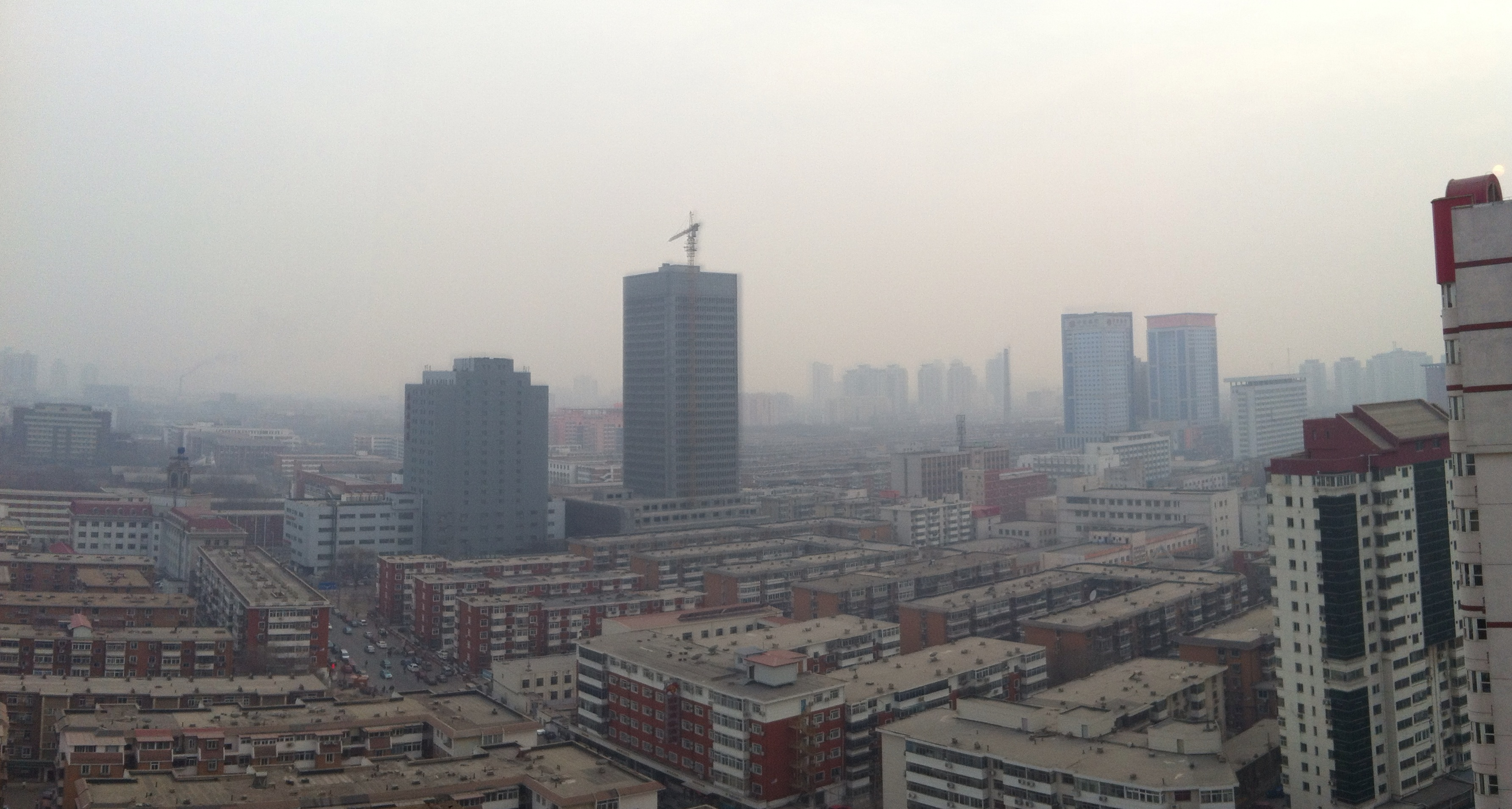
Aerial view of Wanxing Subdistrict, 2012

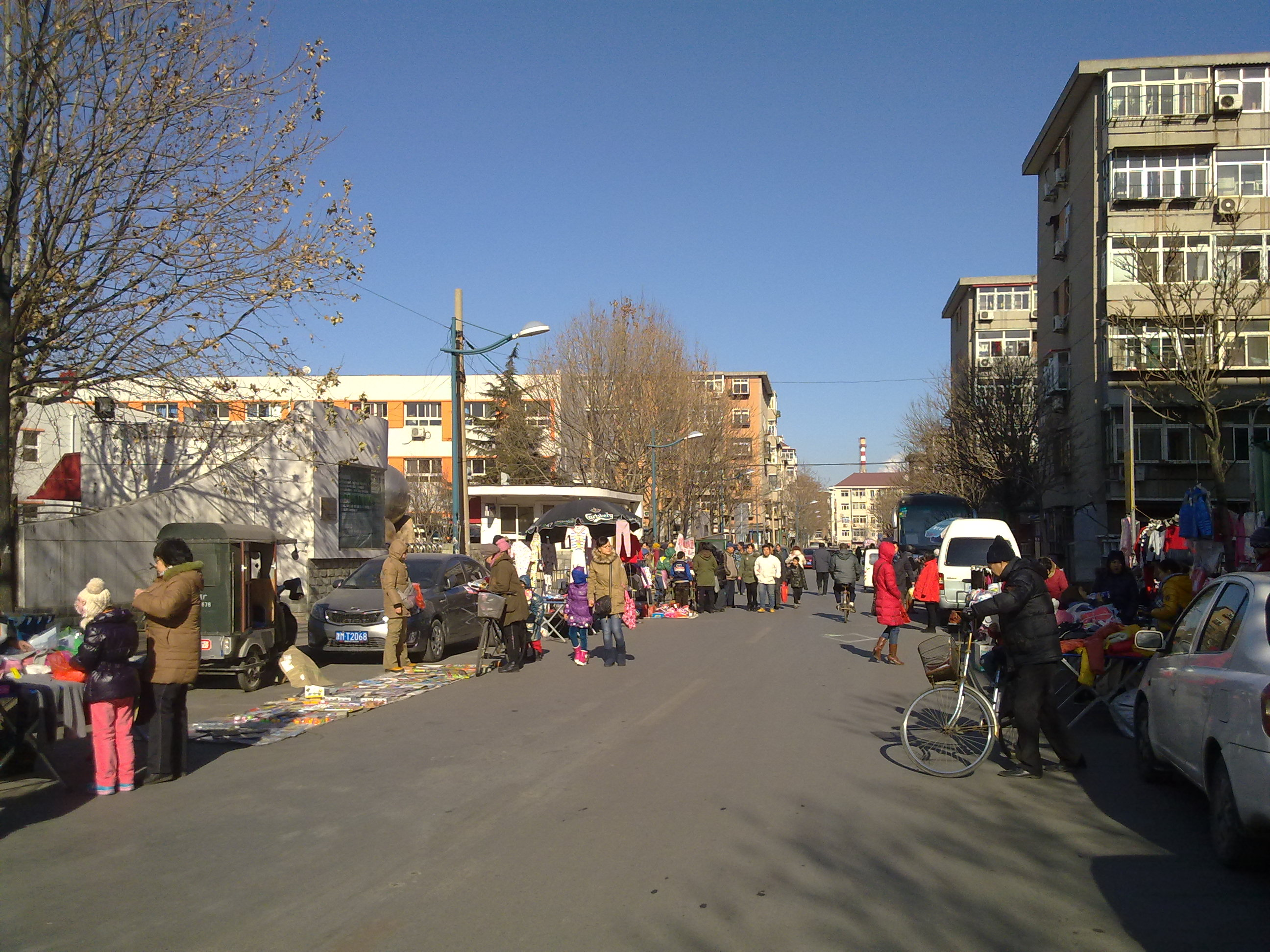
Pinglu Road, 2013

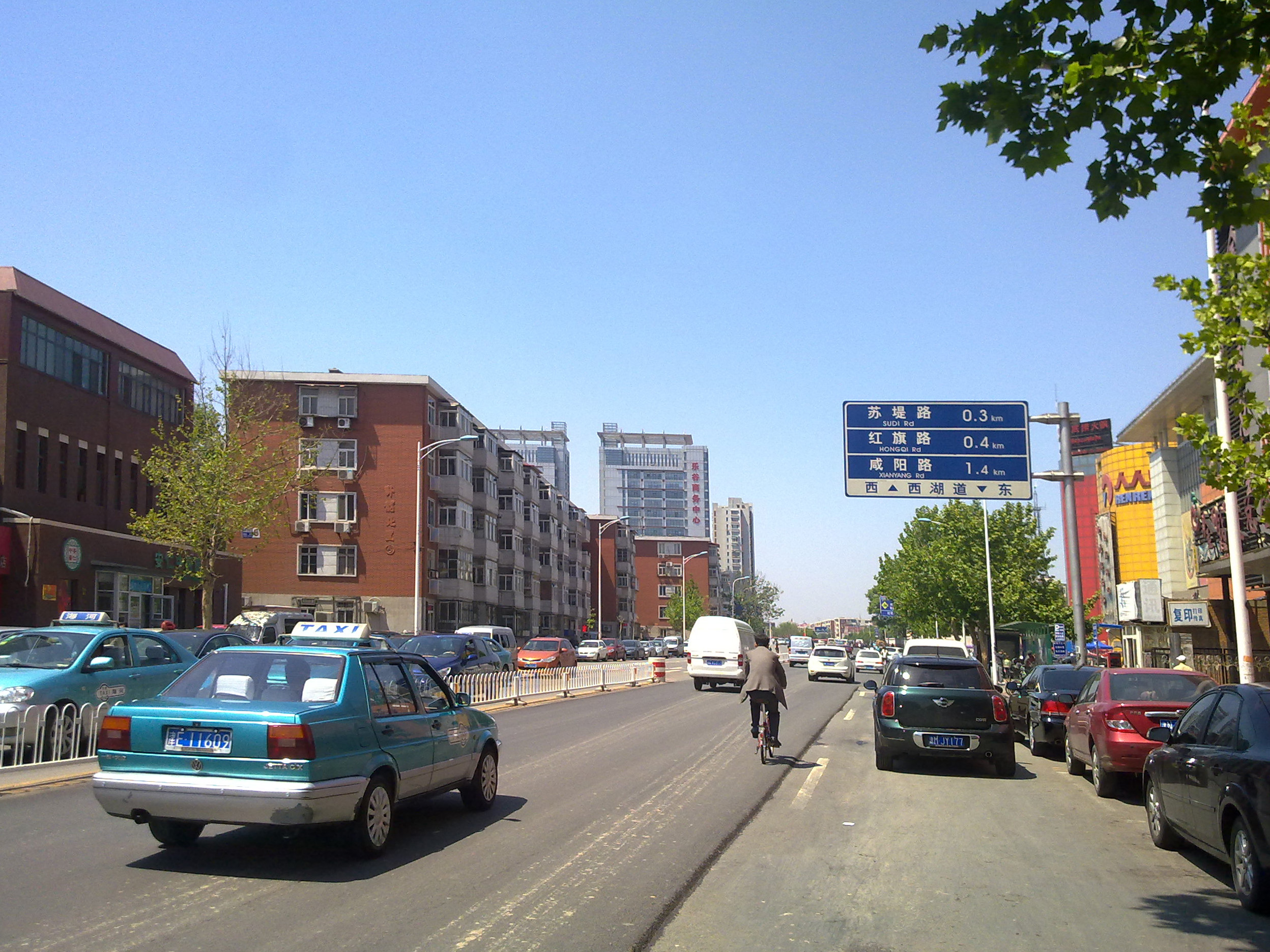
Street view of Xihu Avenue, 2014

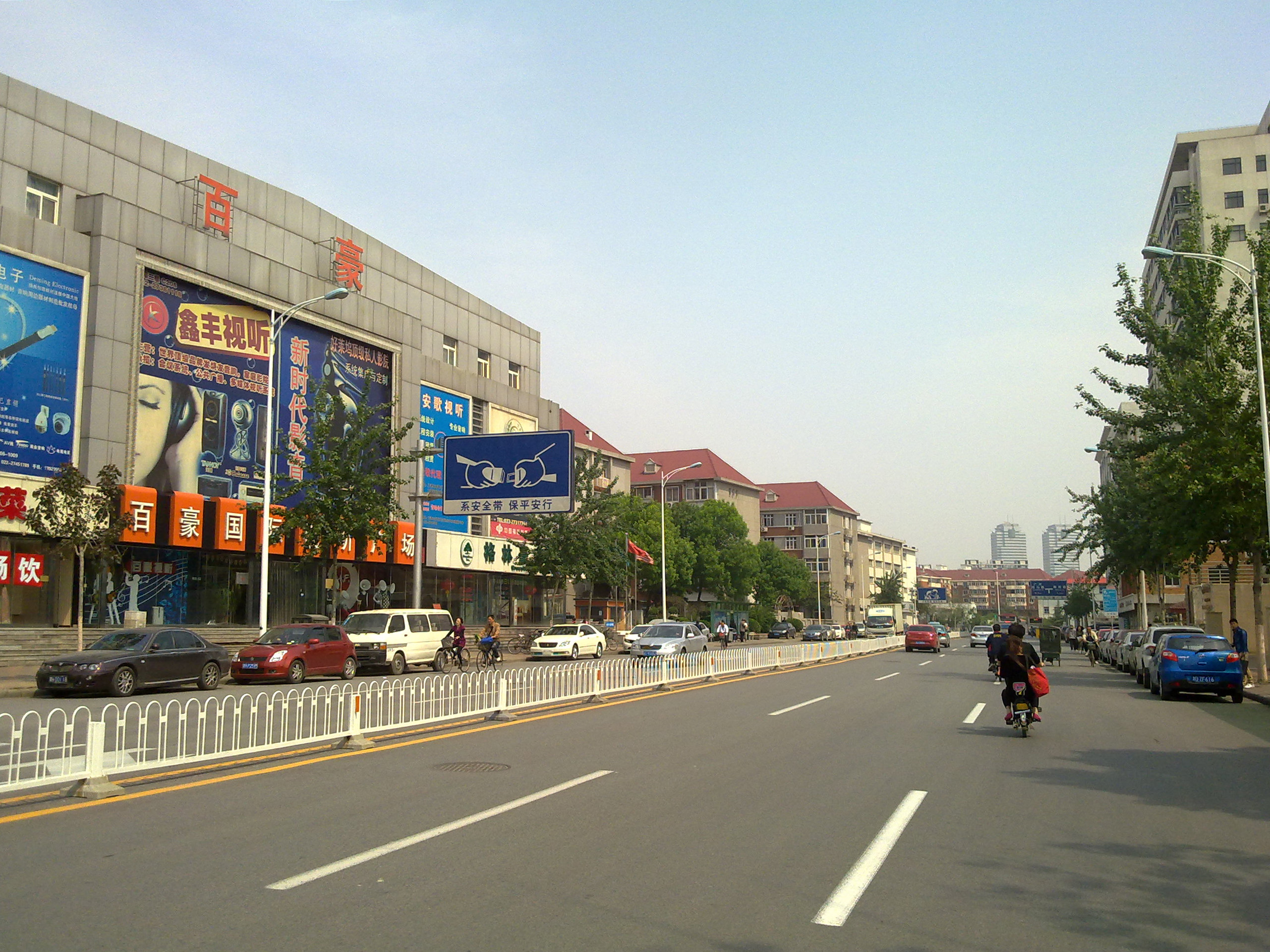
Northern section of Baidi Road, 2014
