= Gulou Subdistrict, Tianjin =

Gulou Subdistrict 鼓楼街道
- Subdistrict
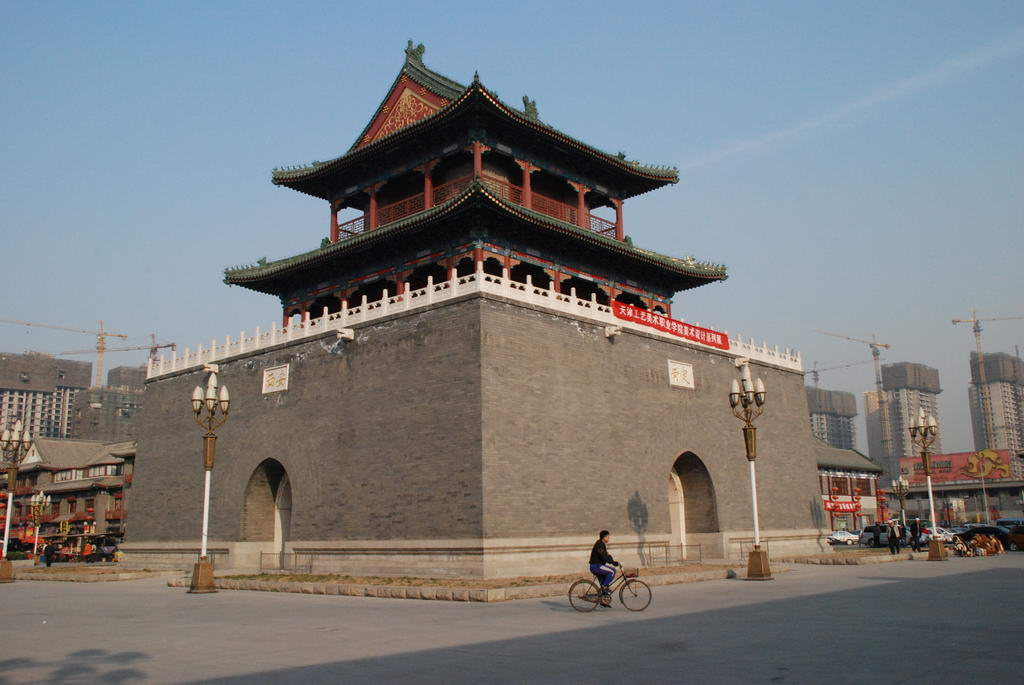
- Drum Tower of Tianjin, 2007

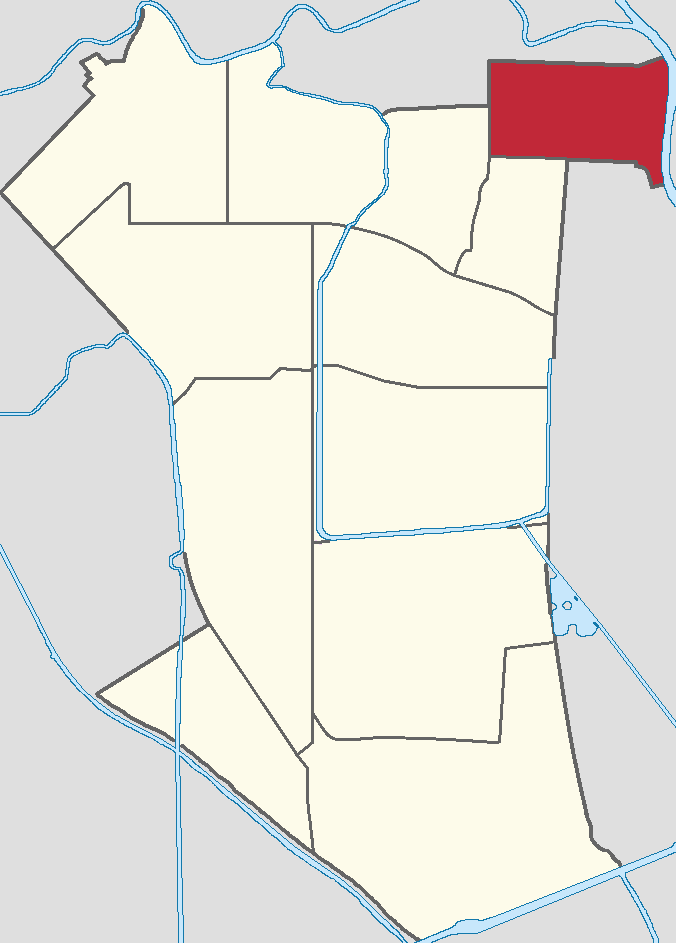
- Location in Nankai District

- Location within Tianjin Location within China
- Coordinates: 39°08′34″N 117°10′32″E
- Country: China
- Municipality: Tianjin
- District: Nankai
- Village-level Divisions: 9 communities

Area
  - Total: 2.05 km^{2} (0.79 sq mi)
- Elevation: 8 m (26 ft)

Population (2010)
  - Total: 28,788
  - Density: 14,000/km^{2} (36,400/sq mi)
- Time zone: UTC+8 (China Standard)
- Postal code: 300120
- Area code: 022

Gulou Subdistrict (simplified Chinese: 鼓楼街道; traditional Chinese: 鼓樓街道; pinyin: Gǔlóu Jiēdào) is a subdistrict situated on the northeast corner of Nankai District, Tianjin, China. It borders Jieyuan and Dahongtong Subdistricts to its north, Guangfudao Subdistrict to its east, Nanshi and Xingnan Subdistricts to its south, as well as Lingdangge and Guangkai Subdistricts to its west. In 2010, its total population was 28,788.

The name Gulou (Chinese: 鼓楼; lit. 'Drum Tower') is referring to a drum tower that was first constructed in the region around 1493.

== Geography ==
Gulou subdistrict is on western bank of Hai River and southern bank of Nanyun River.

== History ==
Timeline of Gulou's History
Year	Status	Part of
1952 - 1954	Four People's Communes: Dongbeijiaojie; Dongnanjiaojie; Xibeijiaojie; Xinanjiaojie	2nd District, Tianjin
1954 - 1958	Dongbeijiao Subdistrict Dongnanjiao Subdistrict Xibeijiao Subdistrict Xinanjiao Subdistrict	2nd District, Tianjin
1958 - 1960	Dongbeijiao Subdistrict Dongnanjiao Subdistrict Gulouxi Subdistrict	Heping District, Tianjin
1960 -	Dongbeijiao People's Commune Dongnanjiao People's Commune Gulouxi People's Commune	Nankai District, Tianjin
1962 - 1966	Dongbeijiao Subdistrict Dongnanjiao Subdistrict Gulouxi Subdistrict	Nankai District, Tianjin
1966 - 1968	Dongbeijiao Subdistrict Dongnanjiao Subdistrict Gulouxi Subdistrict	Dongfanghong District, Tianjin
1968 - 1993	Dongbeijiao Subdistrict Dongnanjiao Subdistrict Gulouxi Subdistrict	Nankai District, Tianjin
1993–present	Gulou Subdistrict	Nankai District, Tianjin

== Administrative divisions ==
As of 2023, Gulou Subdistrict has subdivided 9 residential communities. They are listed as follows:

Subdivision names	Name transliterations
天越园	Tianyueyuan
天霖园	Tianlinyuan
后现代广场	Houxiandai Guangchang
壹街区	Yijiequ
铜锣湾	Tongluowan
海河广场	Haihe Guangchang
尚佳新苑	Shangjia Xinyuan
龙亭家园	Longting Jiayuan
祥丰	Xiangfeng

== Gallery ==
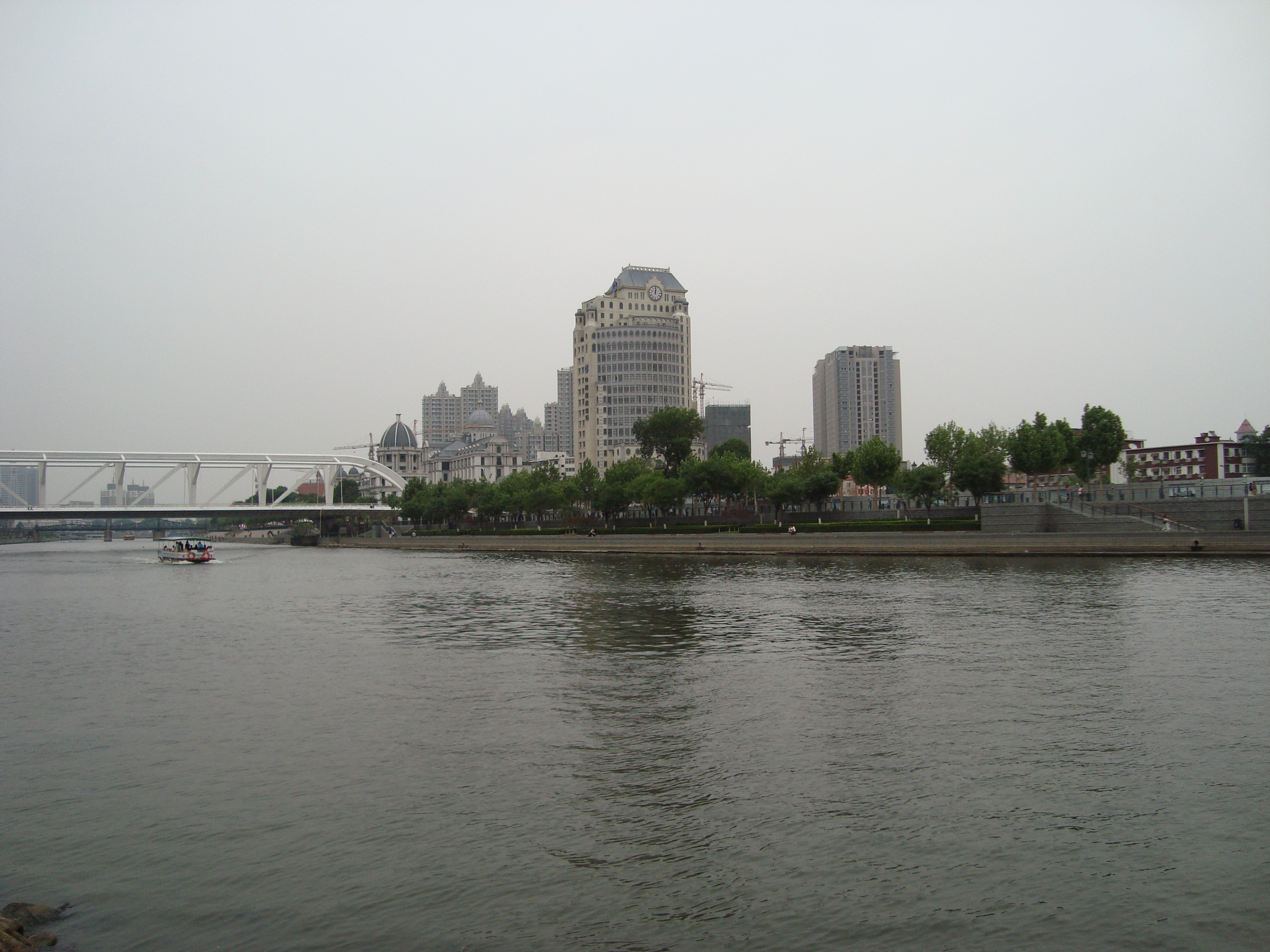
Section of Hai River near the subdistirct, 2009

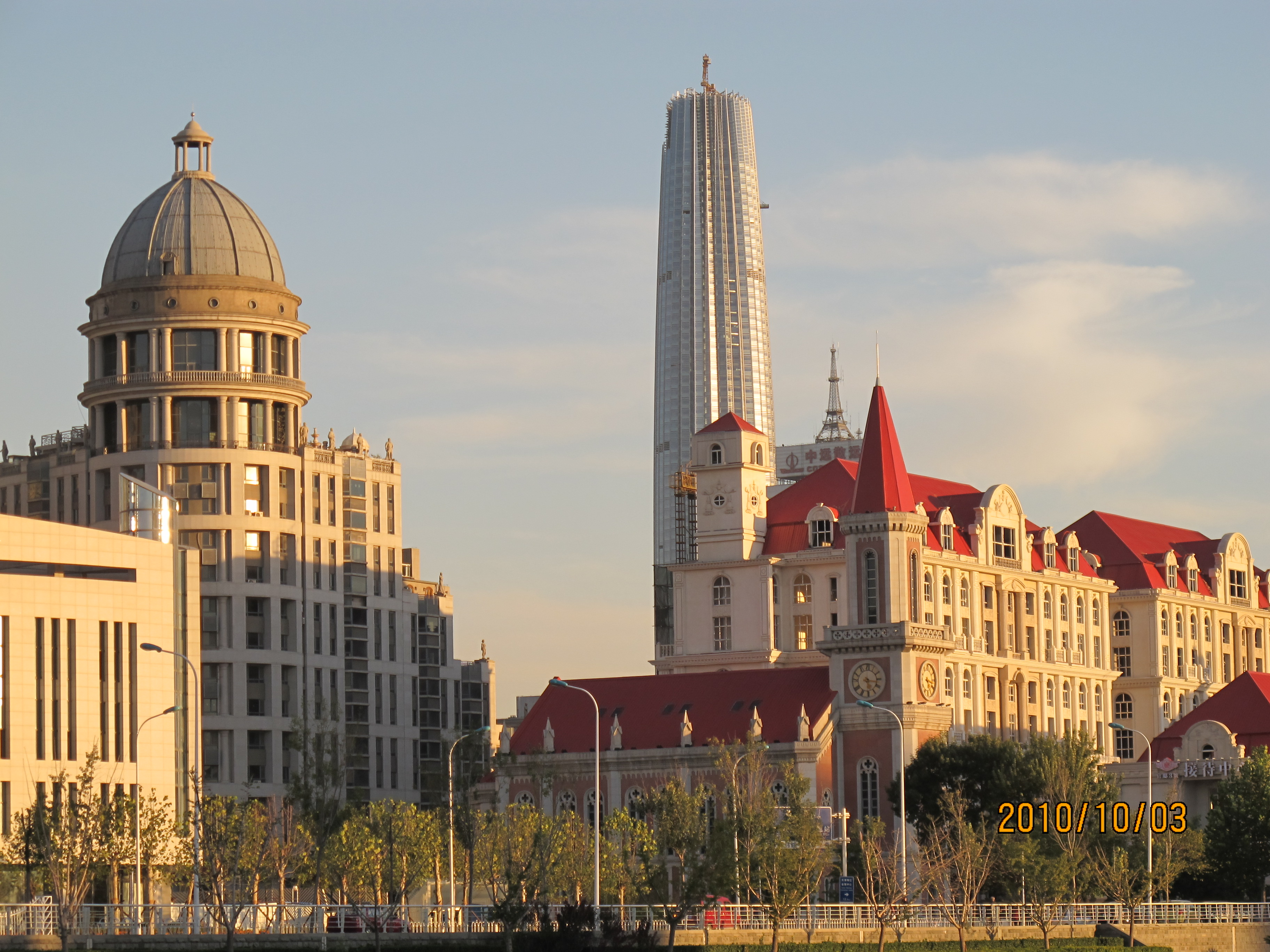
Tianjin Tower, 2010

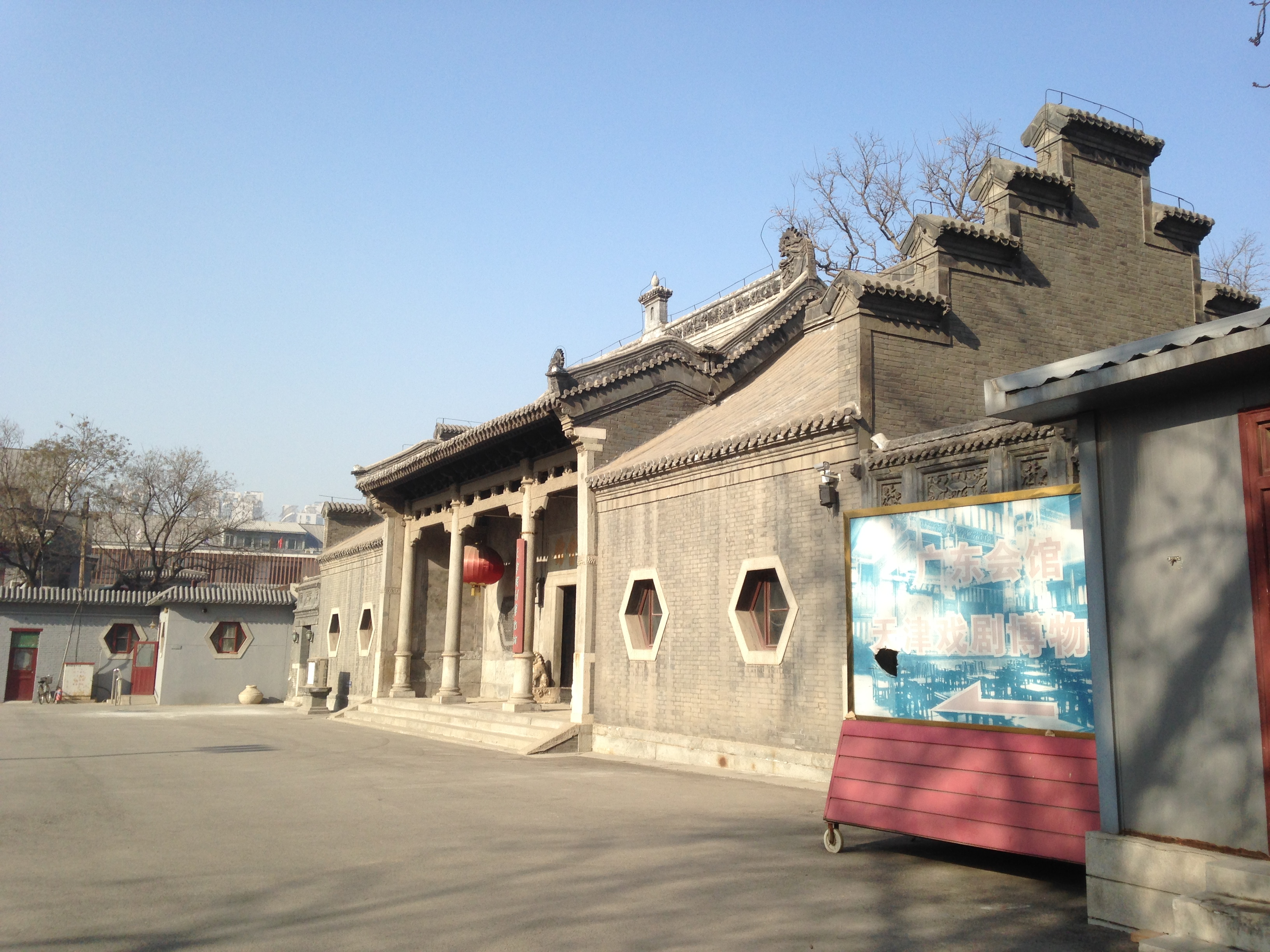
Guangdong Guild Hall, 2014

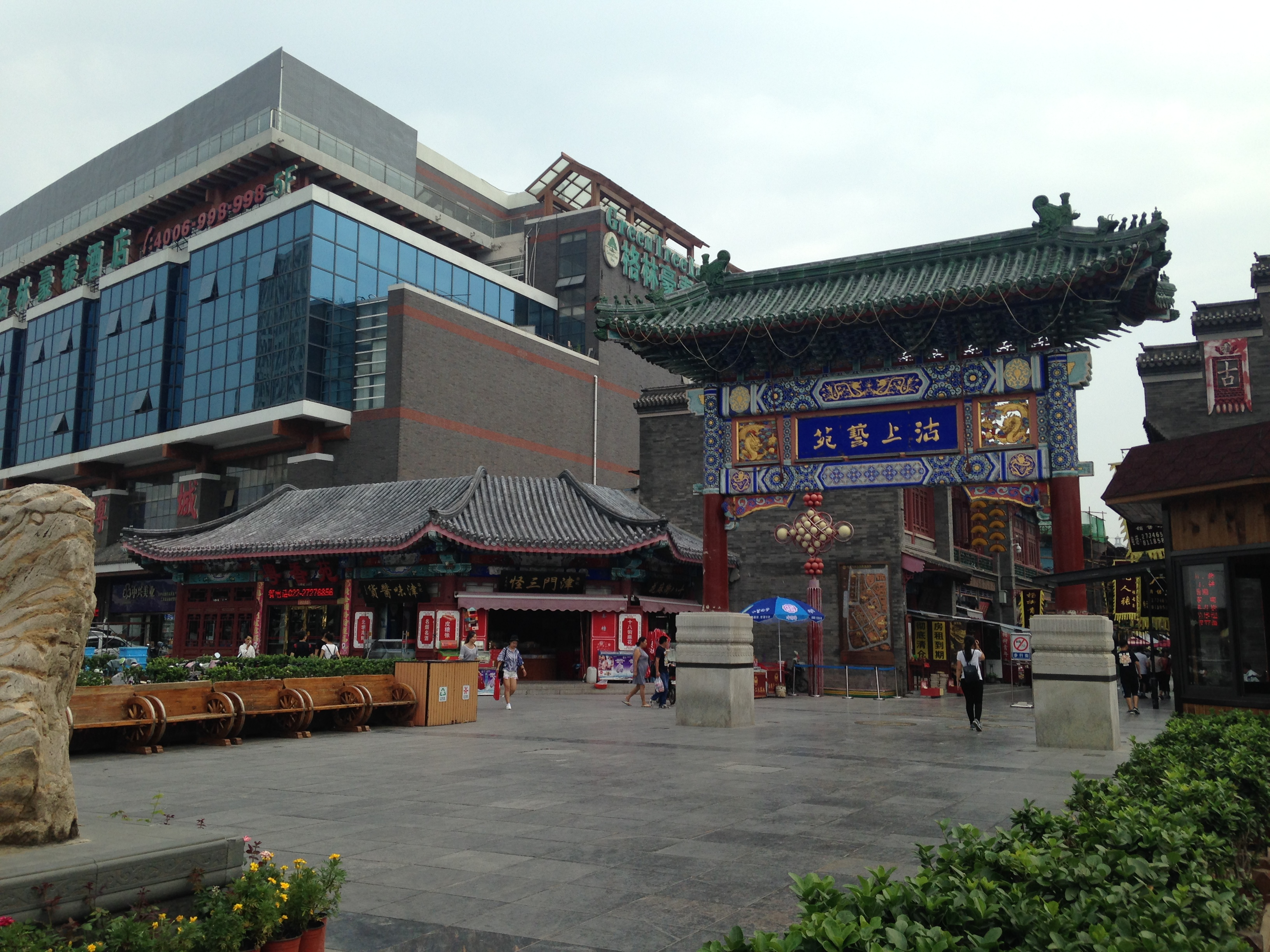
North entrance of Guwenhuajie Street, 2016
