= Nanyingmen Subdistrict =

Nanyingmen Subdistrict 南营门街道
- Subdistrict
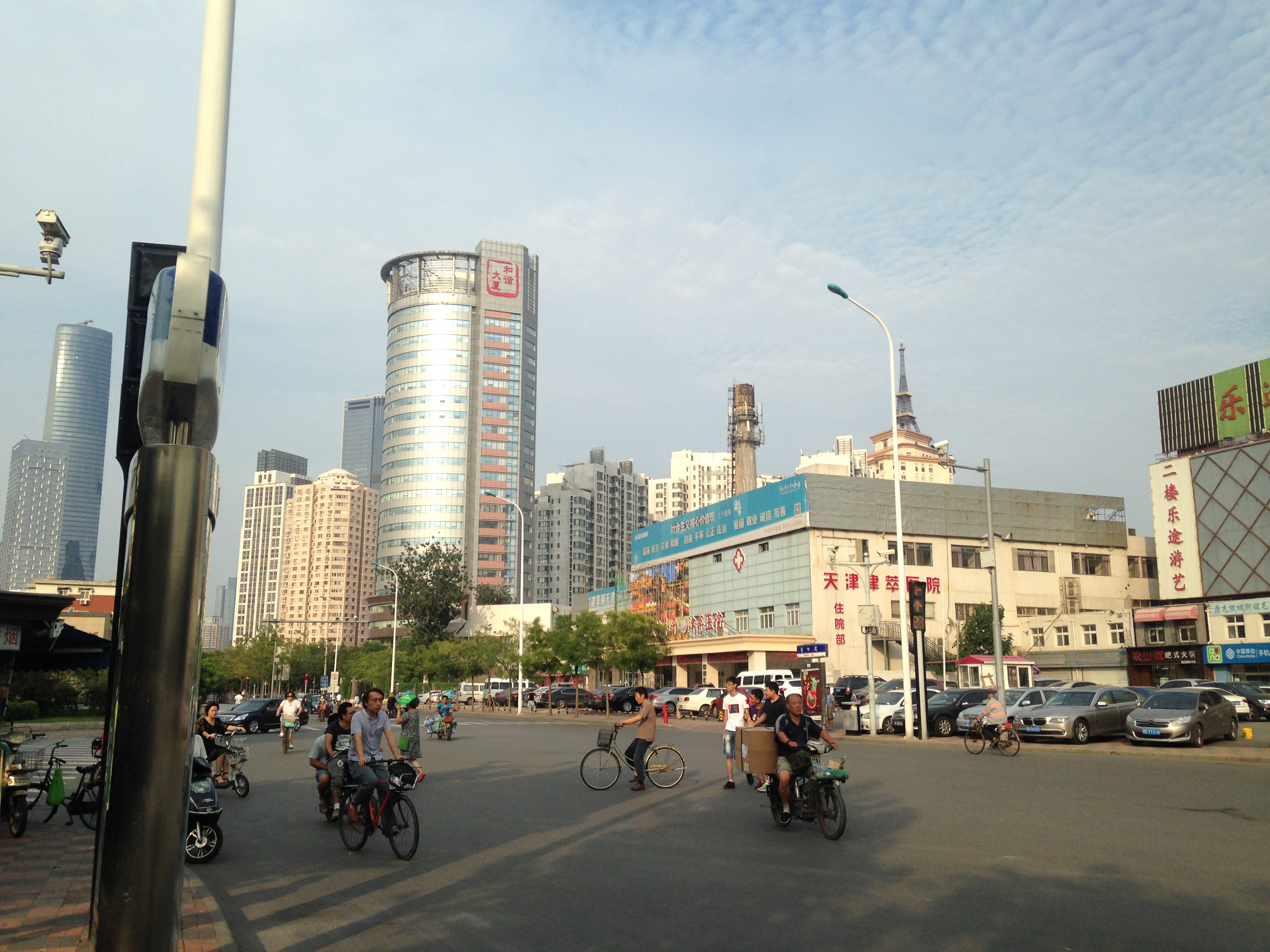
- Yingkou Avenue on the southeastern side of the subdistrict, 2016

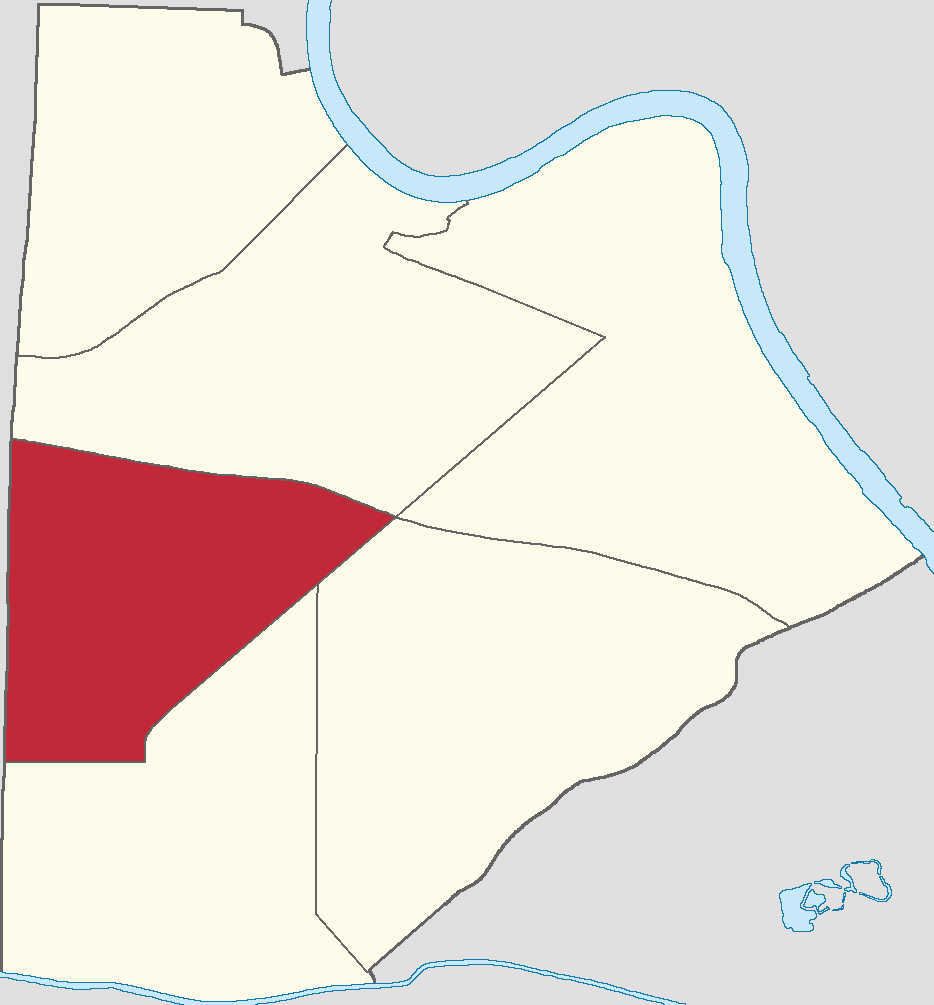
- Location of Nanyingmen Subdistrict in Heping District

- Location within Tianjin Location within China
- Coordinates: 39°07′05″N 117°10′42″E
- Country: China
- Municipality: Tianjin
- District: Heping
- Village-level Divisions: 10 communities

Area
  - Total: 1.26 km^{2} (0.49 sq mi)
- Elevation: 9 m (30 ft)

Population (2010)
  - Total: 47,306
  - Density: 37,500/km^{2} (97,200/sq mi)
- Time zone: UTC+8 (China Standard)
- Postal code: 300041
- Area code: 022

Nanyingmen Subdistrict (simplified Chinese: 南营门街道; traditional Chinese: 南營門街道; pinyin: Nányíngmén Jiēdào) is a subdistrict situated on the west of Heping District, Tianjin. it shares border with Quanyechang Subdistrict in its north, Wudadao Subdistrict in its east, Xinxing Subdistrict in its south, as well as Xuefu and Wanxing Subdistricts in its west. In 2010, It had a population of 47,306.

The name Nanyingmen literally translates to "South Camp Gate".

== History ==
History of Nanyingmen Subdistrict
Year	Status	Within
1955 - 1956	Nanyingmen Subdistrict Dihuadao Subdistrict Tongtaili Subdistrict	5th District, Tianjin
1956 - 1958	Nanyingmen Subdistrict Guiyang Road Subdistrict	Xinua District, Tianjin
1958 - 1960	Nanyingmen Subdistrict	Heping District, Tianjin
1960 - 1962	Nanyingmen People's Commune	Heping District, Tianjin
1962 - 1964	Nanyingmen Subdistrict Guiyang Road Subdistrict	Heping District, Tianjin
1964–present	Nanyingmen Subdistrict (Part of Xinxing Subdistrict joined in 1998)	Heping District, Tianjin

== Administrative divisions ==
At the time of writing, Nanyingmen Subdistrict is composed of 10 communities, which are listed as follows:

Subdivision names	Name transliterations
昆明路	Kunminglu
西宁道	Xiningdao
天兴里	Tianxingli
竞业里	Jingyeli
绵阳道	Jinyangdao
世昌里	Shichangli
香榭里	XInagxieli
天新里	Tianxinli
文化村	Wenhuacun
海光寺	Haiguangsi

== Landmark ==
- St. Joseph Cathedral

== Gallery ==
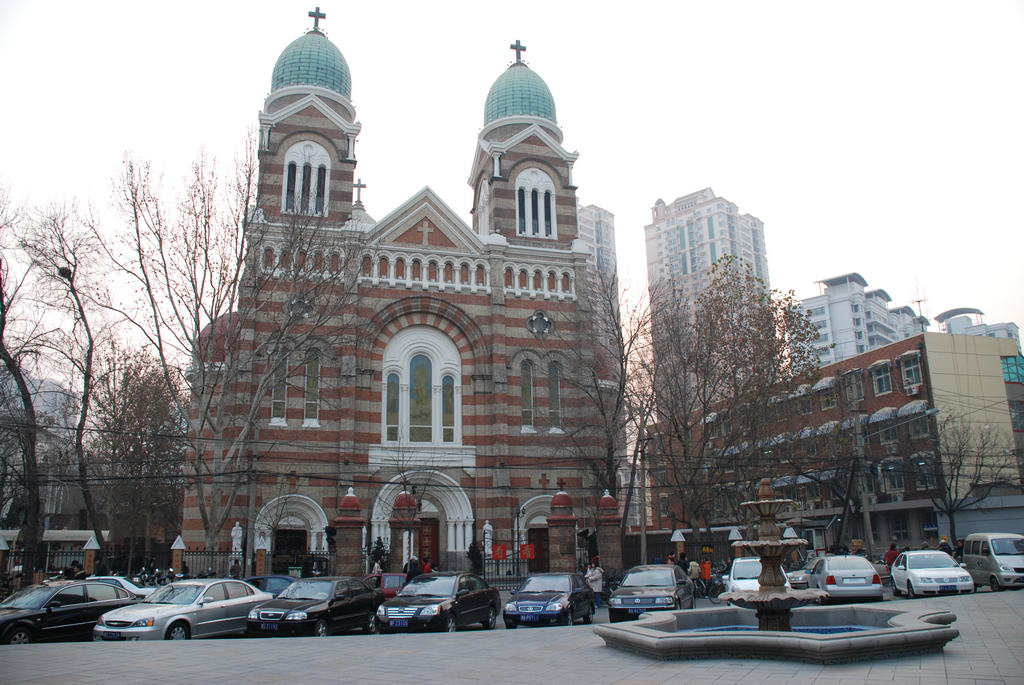
Xikai Church, 2007

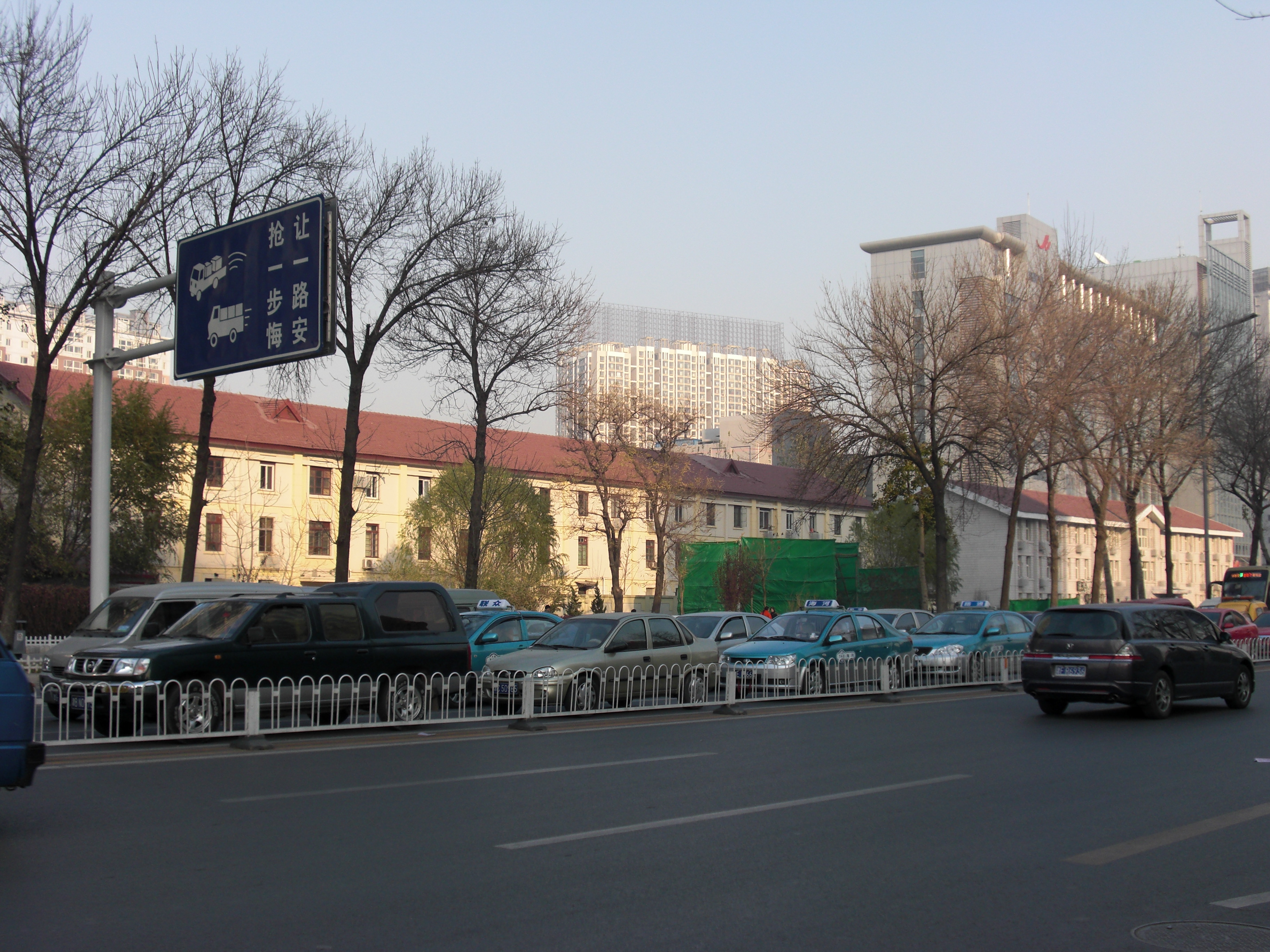
Haiguangsi Residential Community northwest of the subdistrict, 2009

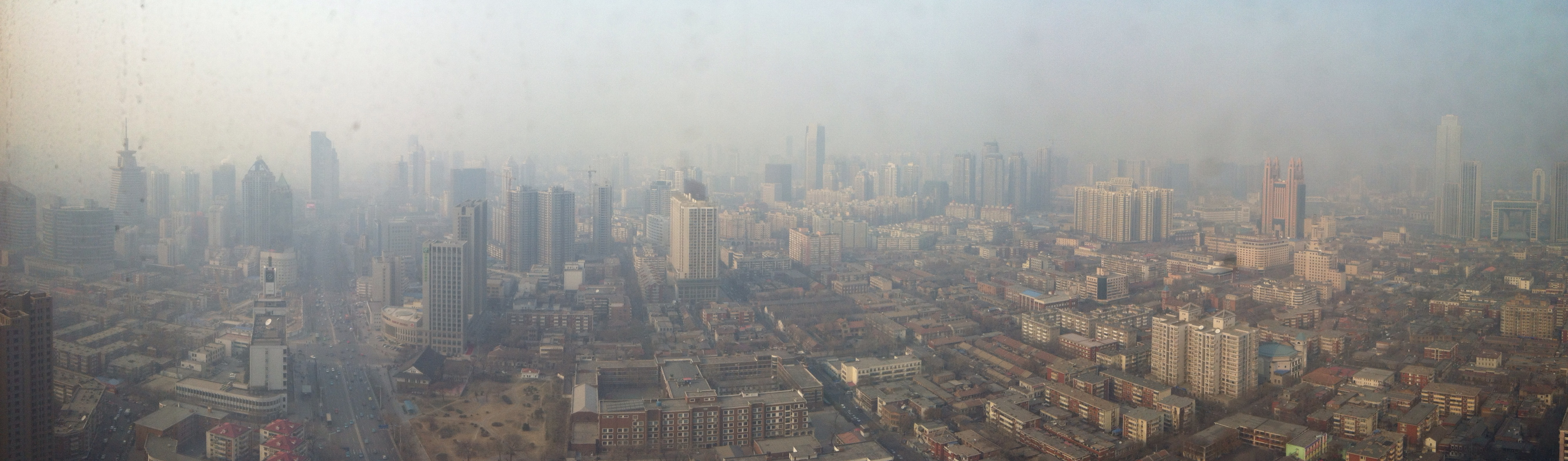
Aerial view of the subdistrict, 2011

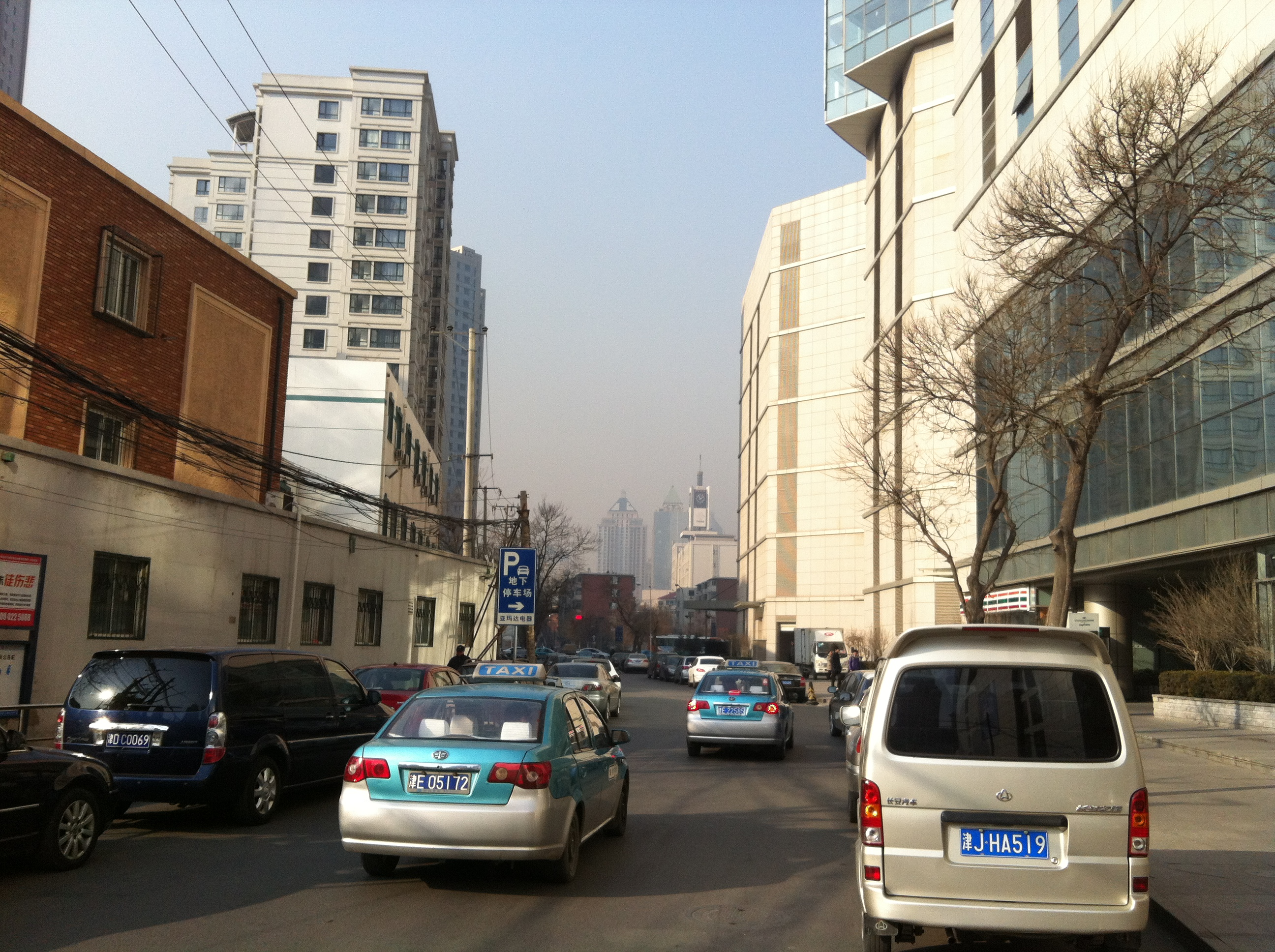
Xining Avenue, 2011
