= Machang Subdistrict =

Machang Subdistrict 马场街道
- Subdistrict
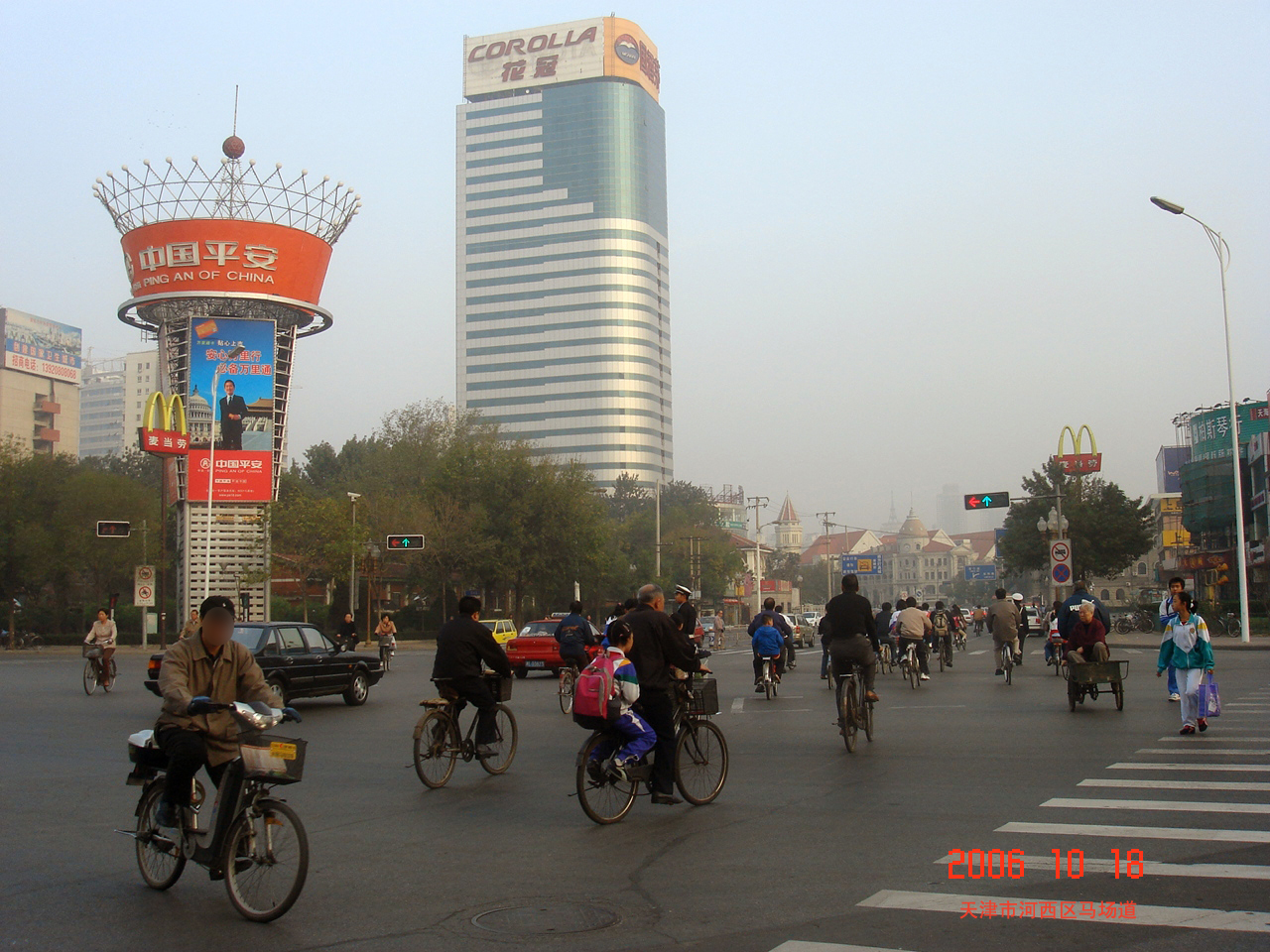
- Machang Avenue on the north of the subdistrict, 2006

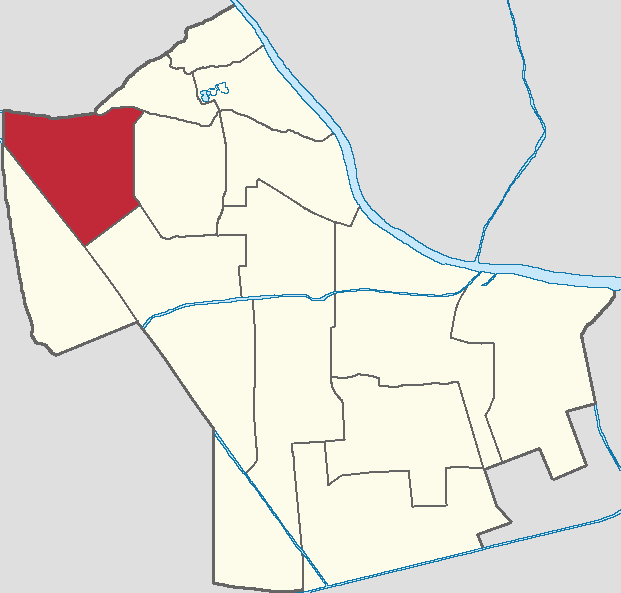
- Location within Hexi District

- Location within Tianjin Location within China
- Coordinates: 39°05′40″N 117°10′57″E
- Country: China
- Municipality: Tianjin
- District: Hexi
- Village-level Divisions: 10 communities

Area
  - Total: 4.12 km^{2} (1.59 sq mi)
- Elevation: 8 m (26 ft)

Population (2010)
  - Total: 54,949
  - Density: 13,300/km^{2} (34,500/sq mi)
- Time zone: UTC+8 (China Standard)
- Postal code: 300200
- Area code: 022

Machang Subdistrict (simplified Chinese: 马场街道; traditional Chinese: 馬場街道; pinyin: Mǎchǎng Jiēdào) is a subdistrict located on the northwestern corner of Hexi District, Tianjin, China. It shares border with Xinxing and Taoyuan Subdistricts to its north, Xiuyue Road Subdistrict to its east, Tianta and Youyi Road Subdistricts to its south, as well as Shuishang Gongyuan and Xuefu Subdistrict to its west. Its population was 54,949 as of 2010.

The subdistrict was established in 1954. Its name (Chinese: 马场; lit. 'Horse Racing Venue') came from a horse racing venue that was constructed here in 1890s, back when this region was a part of the British concession of Tianjin.

== Administrative divisions ==
So far in 2021, Machang Subdistrict consists of 10 communities, which are listed as follows:

Subdivision names	Name transliterations
三合里	Sanheli
四化里	Sihuali
新闻里	Xinwenli
文静里	Wenjingli
先进里	Xianjinli
德才里	Decaili
金山里	Jinshanli
气象里	Qixiangli
君禧华庭	Junxi Huating
卫星雅苑	Weixing Yayuan

== Gallery ==
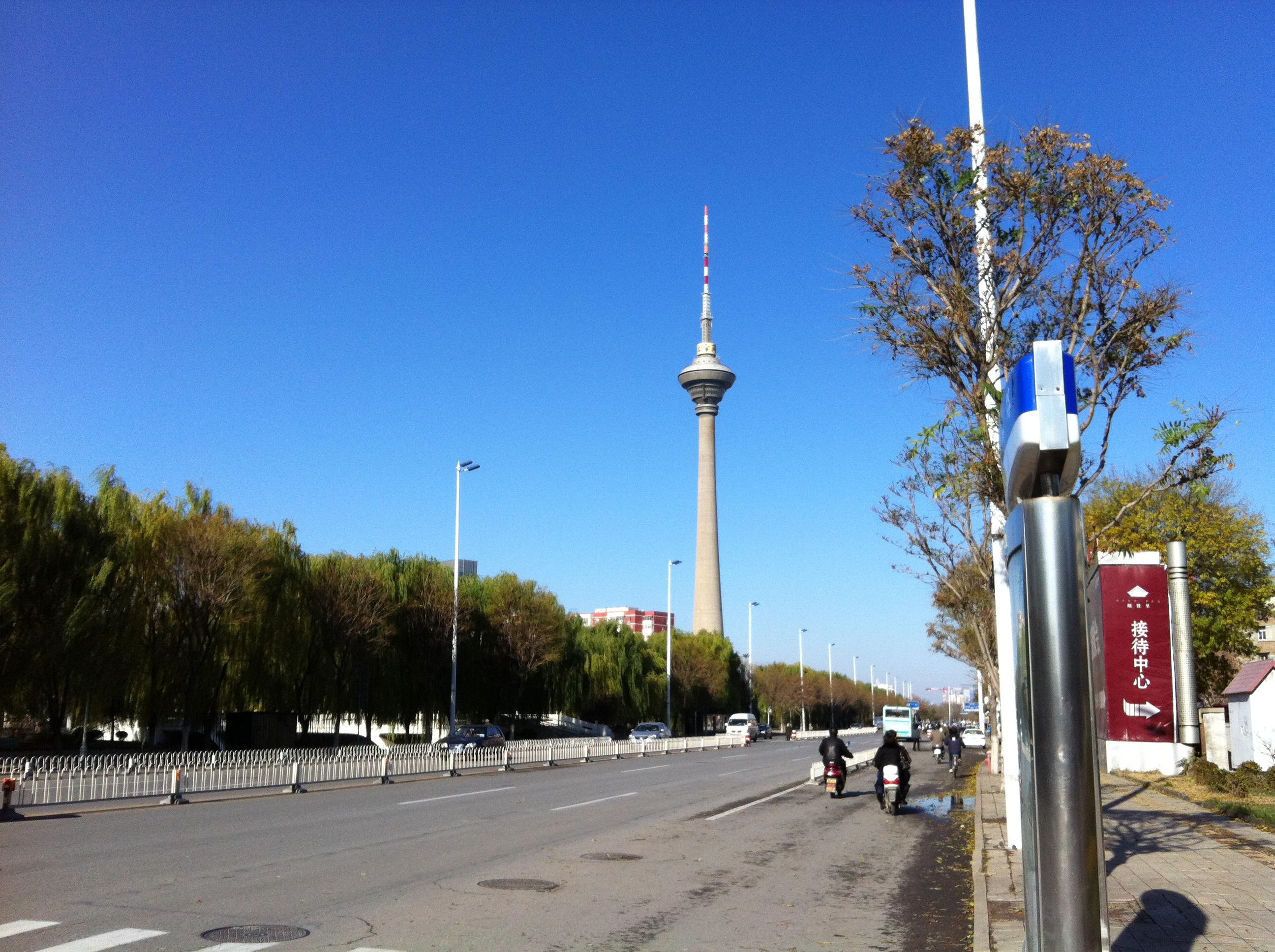
View of the Tianjin TV Tower from the northern bank of Wenjin River, 2011

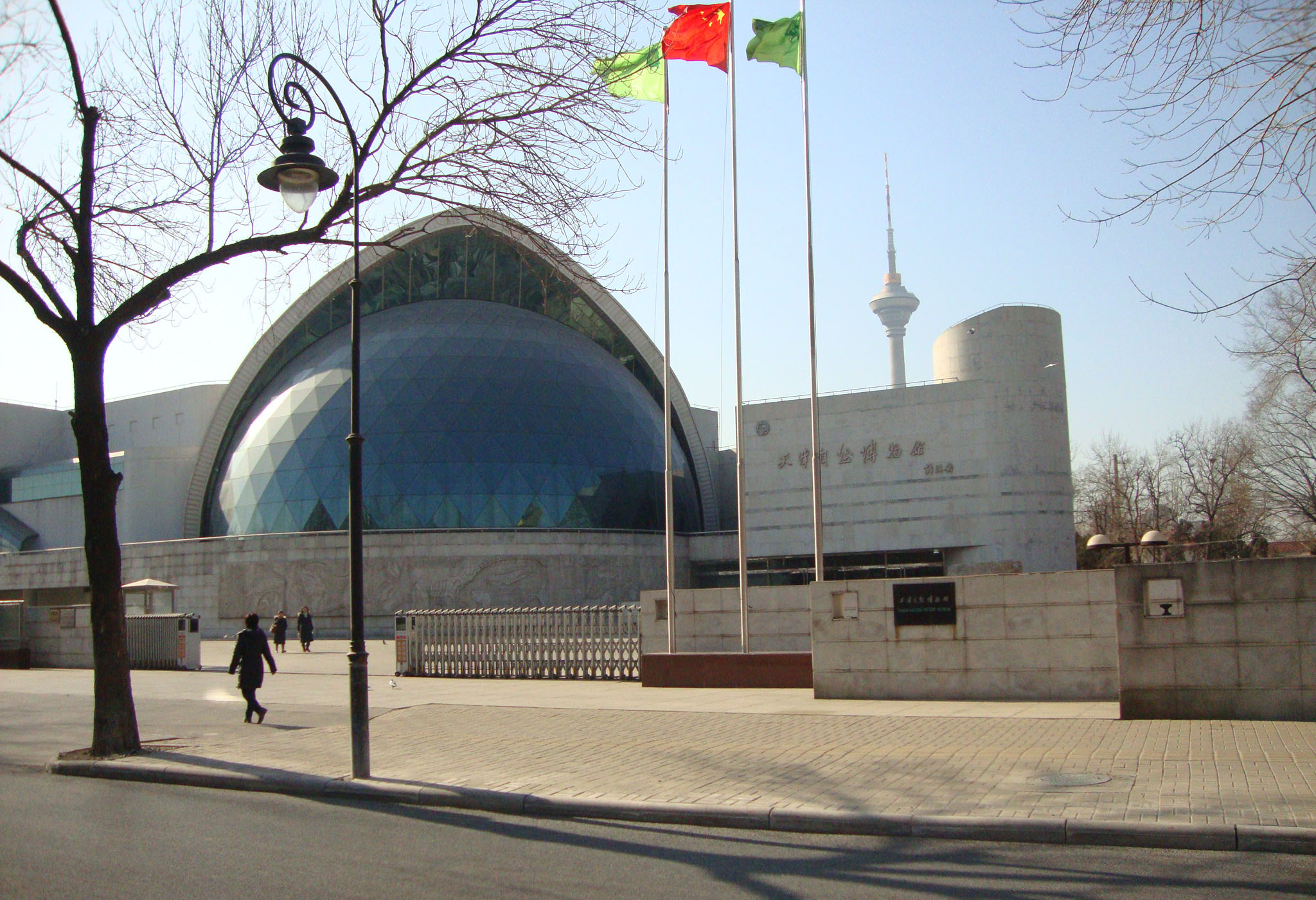
Tianjin Natural History Museum, 2011

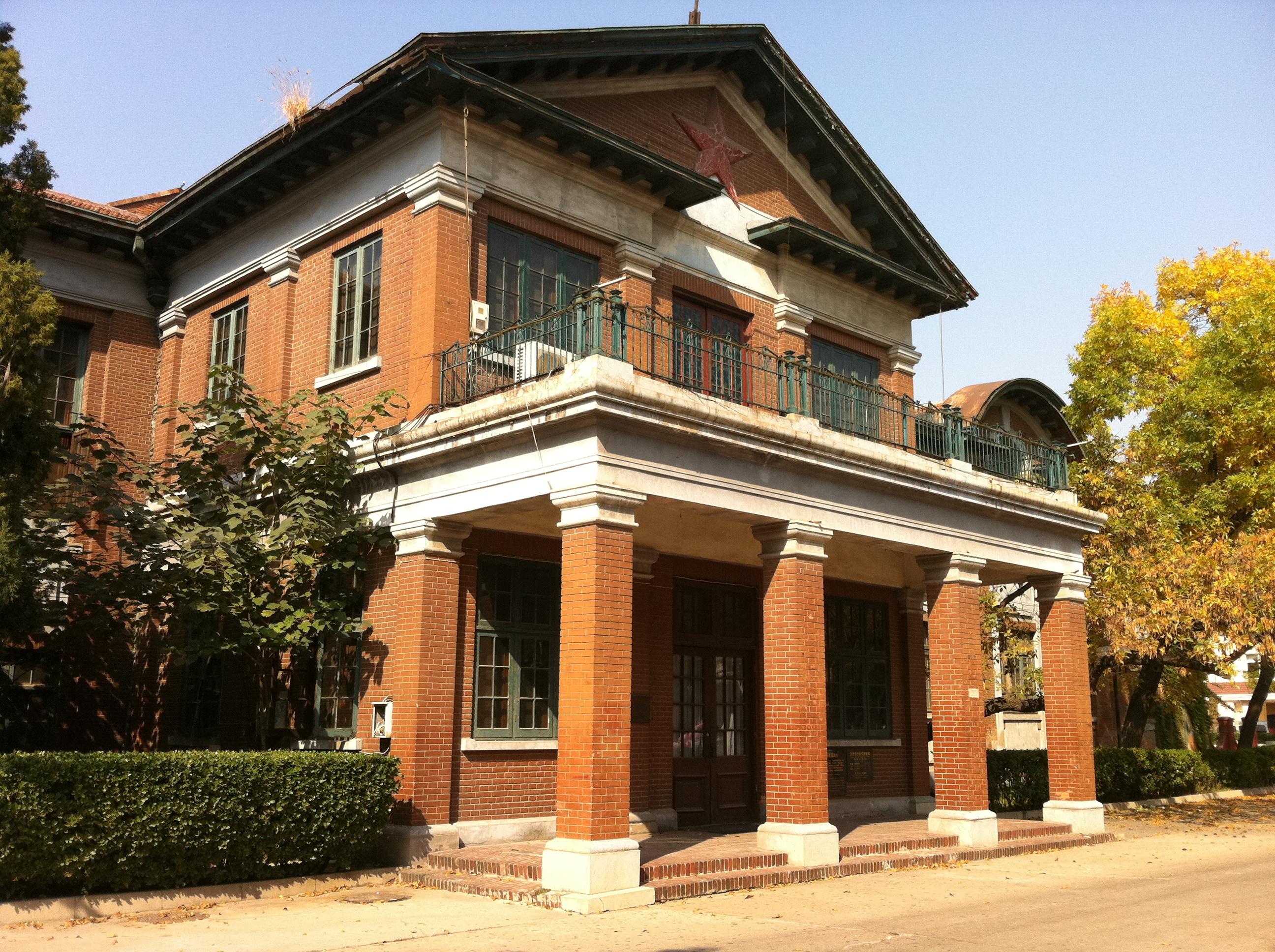
Building of the former British Race Club, 2011

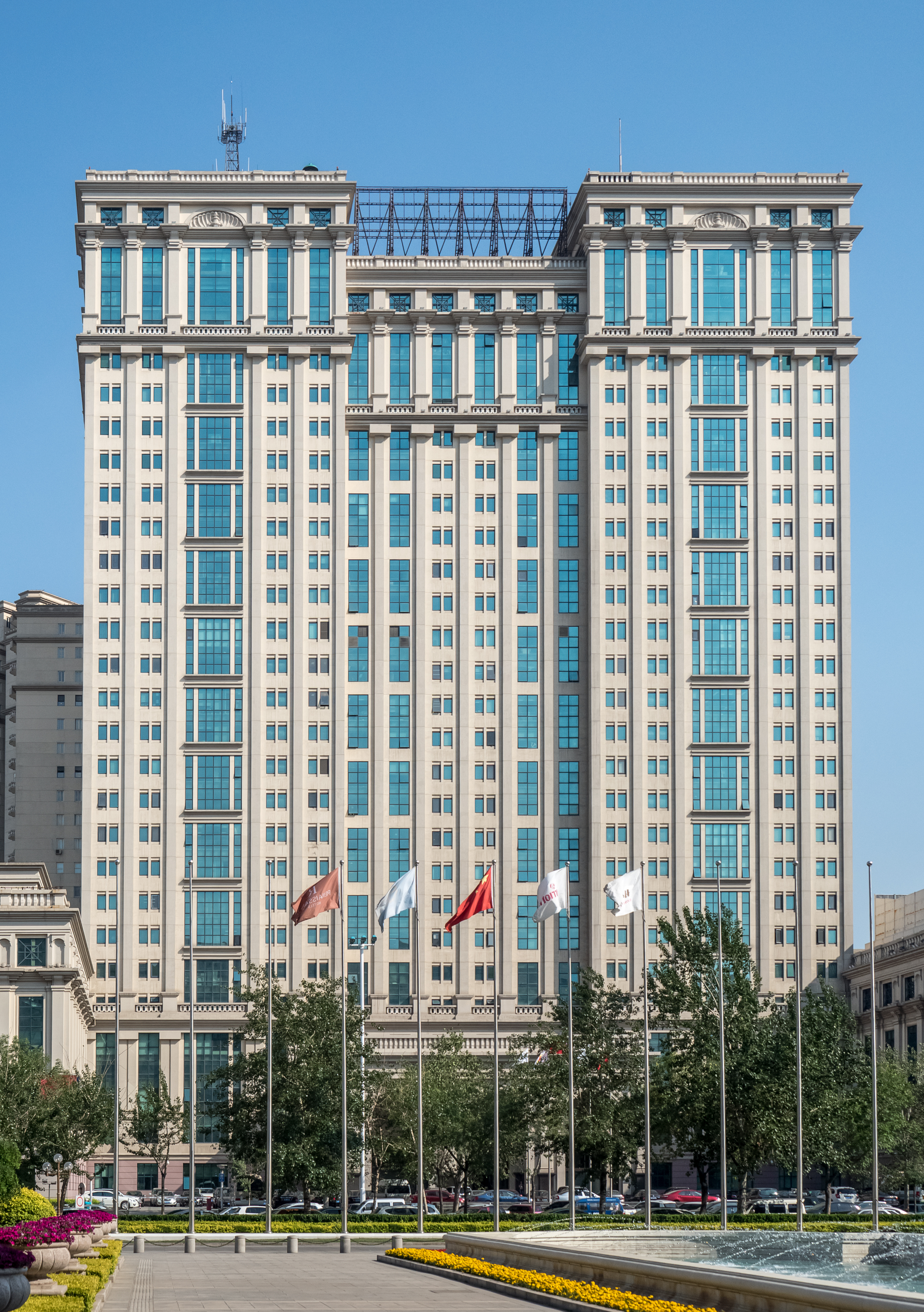
China Tianjin Binshui Dongli Apartment, 2015
