= Taihu Road station =

Metro station in Tianjin, China

Taihu Road 太湖路
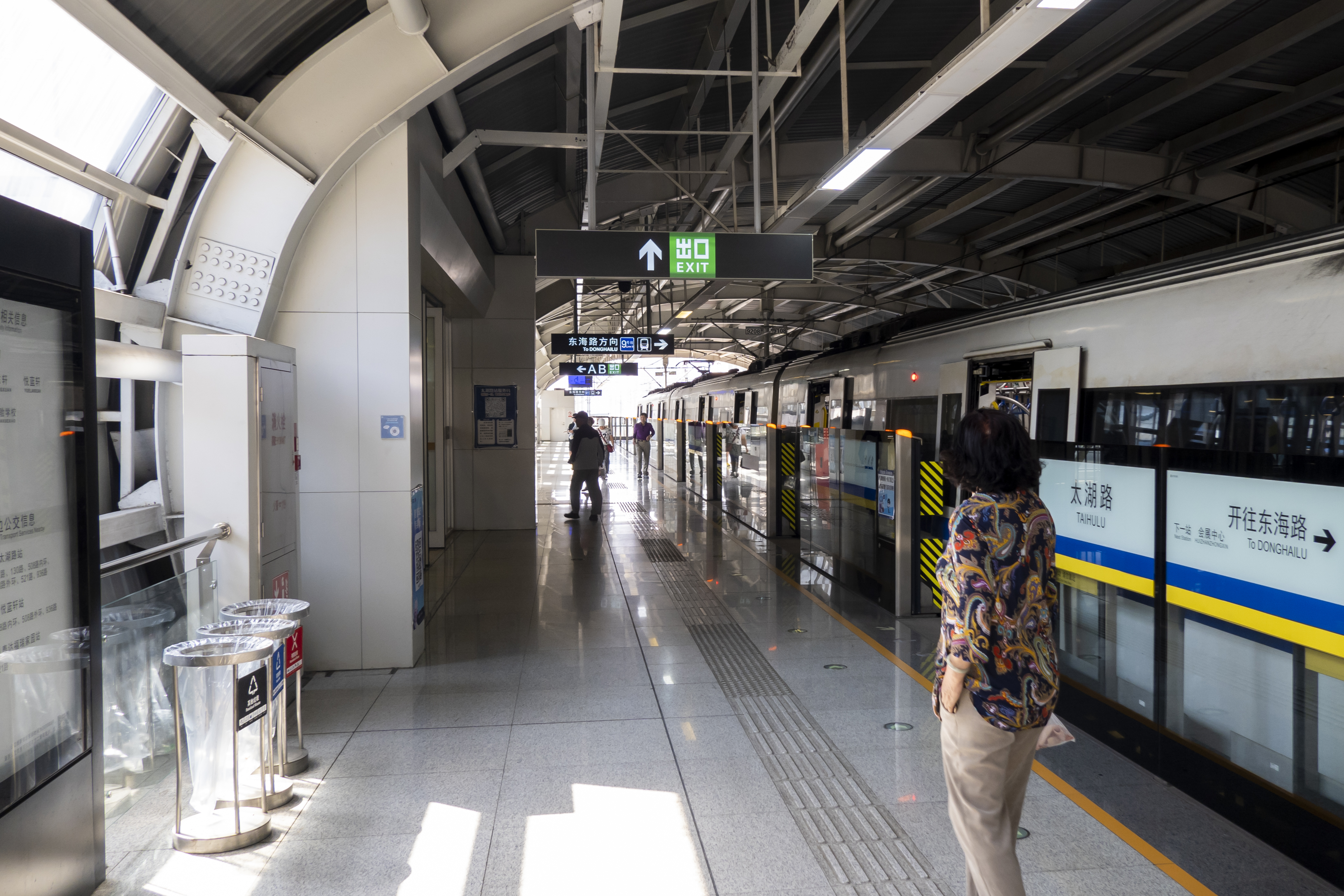
- Station platform in 2023

General information
- Location: Binhai District, Tianjin; China
- Coordinates: 39°1′8.17″N 117°43′2.4″E
- System: Tianjin Metro
- Operated by: Binhai Mass Transit Co. Ltd.
- Line: Line 9
- Platforms: 2

Construction
- Structure type: Elevated

History
- Opened: 31 December 2016
- Previous names: Binhai University station

Services
Preceding station	Tianjin Metro	Following station
Shiminguangchang towards Tianjinzhan	Line 9	Huizhanzhongxin towards Donghailu
Location

Taihu Road station (Chinese: 太湖路站), also known as Taihulu station, is a station on Line 9 of the Tianjin Metro. The infill station, planned under the name Binhai University station, opened on December 31, 2016.
