= Xinli station =

Metro station in Tianjin, China

Coordinates: 39°4′42″N 117°21′3″E

Xinli 新立
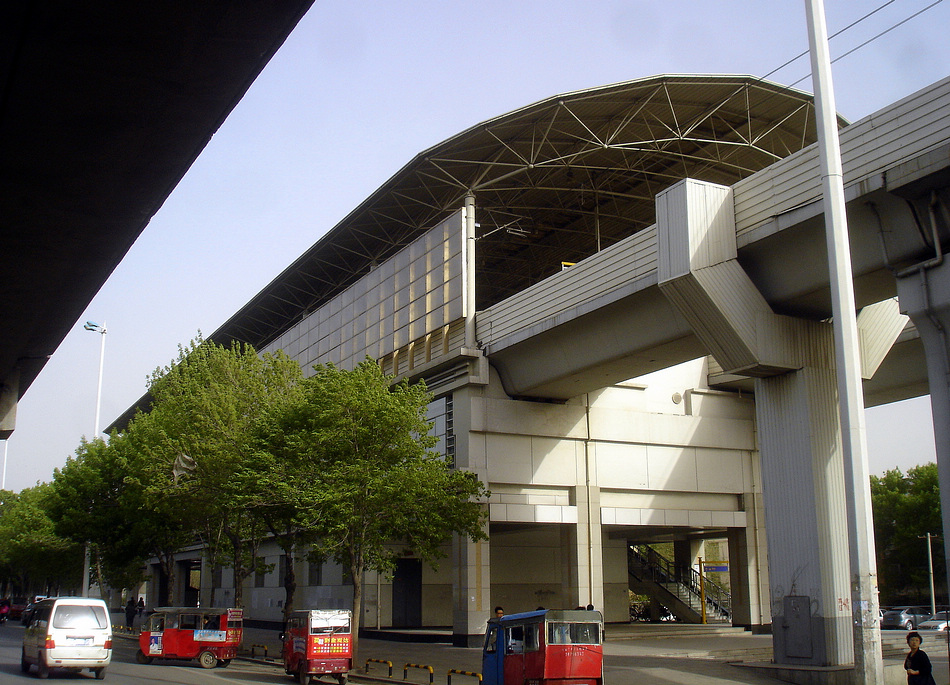

General information
- Location: Dongli District, Tianjin; China
- Operator: Binhai Mass Transit Co. Ltd.
- Line: Line 9

Construction
- Structure type: Elevated

History
- Opened: 28 March 2004

Services
Preceding station	Tianjin Metro	Following station
Zhangguizhuang towards Tianjinzhan	Line 9	Donglikaifaqu towards Donghailu
Location

Xinli Station (Chinese: 新立站) is a station of Line 9 of the Tianjin Metro. It started operations on 28 March 2004.
