= Tianjin Pipe Corporation station =

Metro station in Tianjin, China

Coordinates: 39°2′20″N 117°29′51″E

Tianjin Pipe Corp. 钢管公司
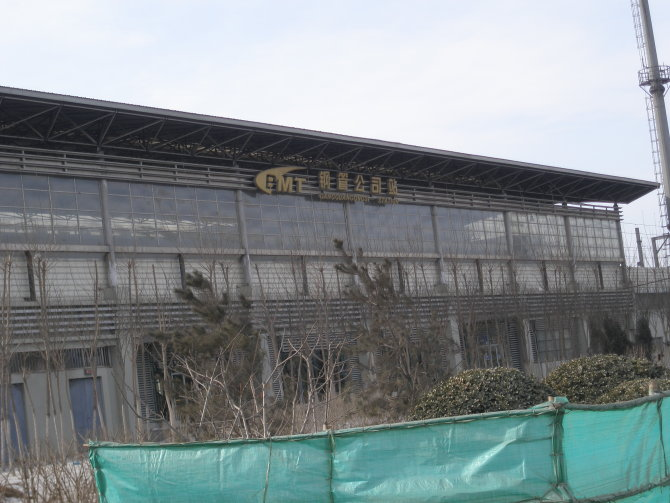

General information
- Location: Dongli District, Tianjin; China
- Operated by: Binhai Mass Transit Co. Ltd.
- Line(s): Line 9

Construction
- Structure type: Elevated

History
- Opened: 28 March 2004

Services
Preceding station	Tianjin Metro	Following station
Junliangcheng towards Tianjinzhan	Line 9	Hujiayuan towards Donghailu

Tianjin Pipe Corporation Station (Chinese: 钢管公司站), also known as Gangguangongsi Station, is a station of Line 9 of the Tianjin Metro. It started operations on 28 March 2004.

After the 2015 Tianjin explosions, all service to this station was suspended. The station resumed operations as the temporary terminus of Line 9 on December 16, 2015. On June 27, 2016, service was extended to Citizen Plaza Station.

The station was named after Tianjin Pipe Corporation.
