= Dongli Economic Development Area station =

Metro station in Tianjin, China

Dongli Economic Development Area 东丽开发区
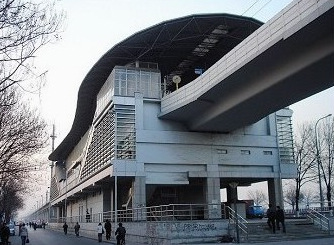

General information
- Location: Dongli District, Tianjin; China
- Coordinates: 39.0783°N 117.3510°E
- Operator: Binhai Mass Transit Co. Ltd.
- Line: Line 9

Construction
- Structure type: Elevated

History
- Opened: 28 March 2004

Services
Preceding station	Tianjin Metro	Following station
Xinli towards Tianjinzhan	Line 9	Xiaodongzhuang towards Donghailu
Location

Dongli Economic Development Area Station (Chinese: 东丽开发区站), also known as Donglikaifaqu Station, is a station of Line 9 of the Tianjin Metro. It started operations on 28 March 2004.
