= Hujiayuan station =

Metro station in Tianjin, China

Hujiayuan 胡家园
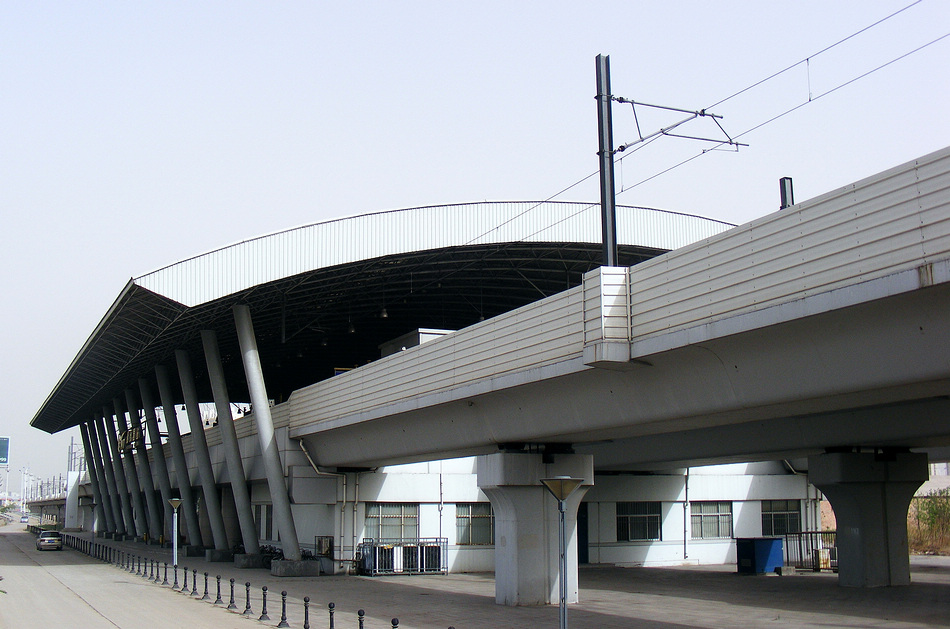

General information
- Location: Binhai District, Tianjin; China
- Coordinates: 39°2′23″N 117°36′4″E
- Operated by: Binhai Mass Transit Co. Ltd.
- Line(s): Line 9

Construction
- Structure type: Elevated

History
- Opened: 28 March 2004 (as employee commuter service); March 1, 2006 (as passenger service)

Services
Preceding station	Tianjin Metro	Following station
Gangguangongsi towards Tianjinzhan	Line 9	Tanggu towards Donghailu

Hujiayuan Station (simplified Chinese: 胡家园站; traditional Chinese: 胡家園站; pinyin: Hújiāyuán Zhàn) is a Chinese station of Line 9 of the Tianjin Metro. It started operations for employees commuter service on March 28, 2004, and begins started passenger service on March 31, 2006.
