= Xiaodongzhuang station =

Metro station in Tianjin, China

Xiaodongzhuang 小东庄
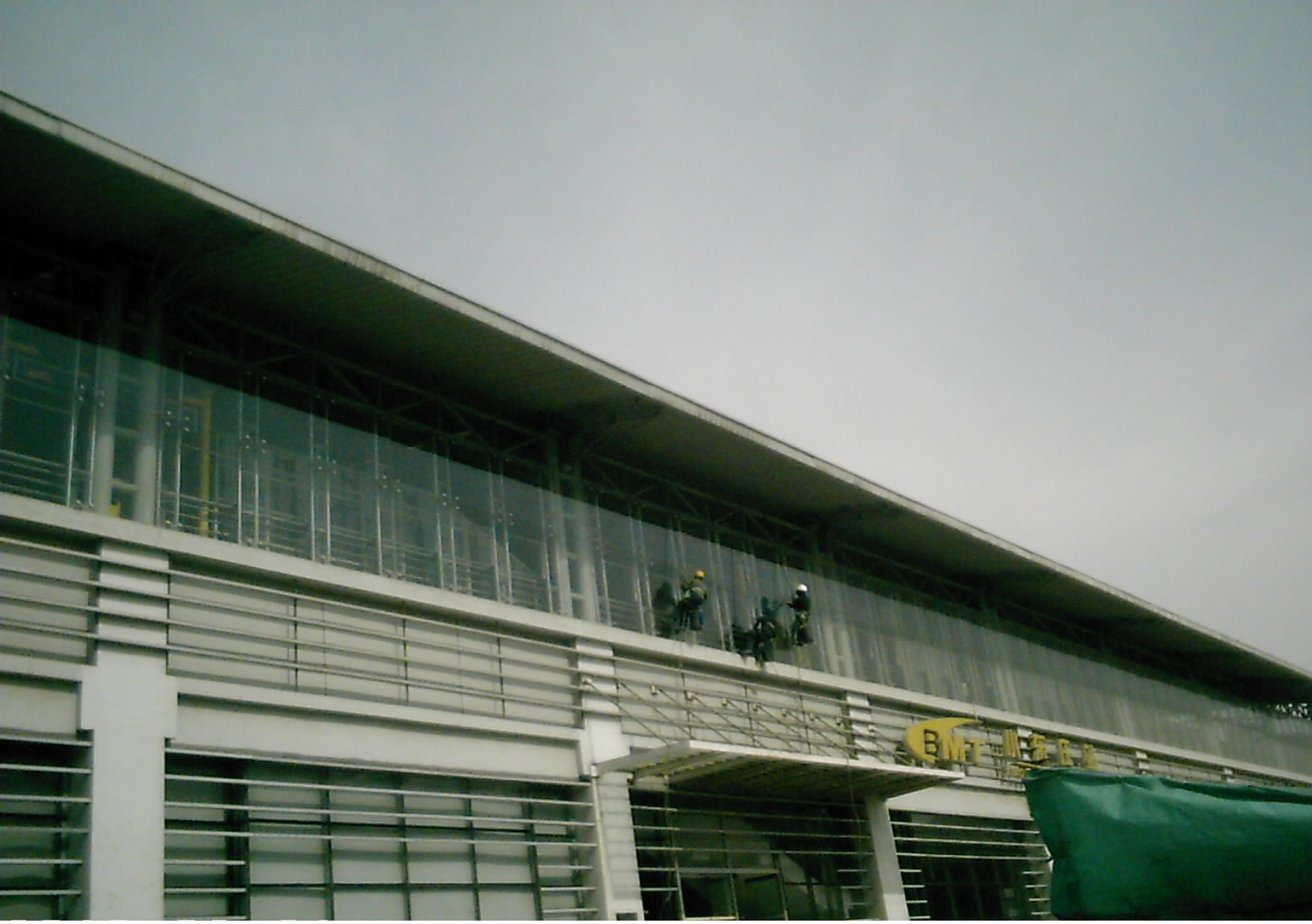

General information
- Location: Dongli District, Tianjin; China
- Coordinates: 39°3′48″N 117°23′48″E
- Operator: Binhai Mass Transit Co. Ltd.
- Line: Line 9

Construction
- Structure type: Elevated

History
- Opened: 28 March 2004

Services
Preceding station	Tianjin Metro	Following station
Donglikaifaqu towards Tianjinzhan	Line 9	Junliangcheng towards Donghailu
Location

Xiaodongzhuang Station (Chinese: 小东庄站) is a station of Line 9 of the Tianjin Metro. It started operations on 28 March 2004.
