= Junliangcheng station =

Metro station in Tianjin, China

Junliangcheng 军粮城
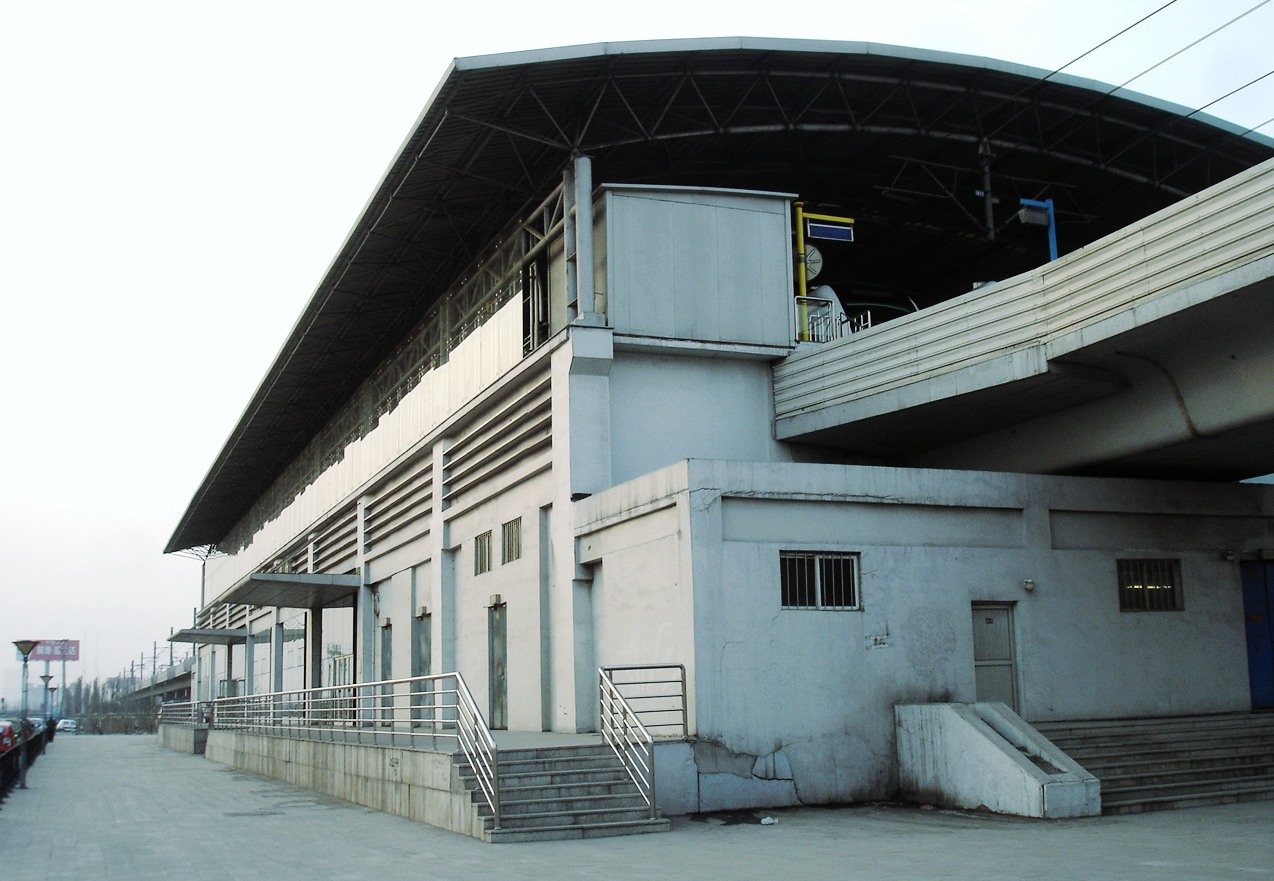

General information
- Location: Dongli District, Tianjin; China
- Coordinates: 39.0469°N 117.4490°E
- Operated by: Binhai Mass Transit Co. Ltd.
- Line: Line 9

Construction
- Structure type: Elevated

History
- Opened: 28 March 2004

Services
Preceding station	Tianjin Metro	Following station
Xiaodongzhuang towards Tianjinzhan	Line 9	Gangguangongsi towards Donghailu
Location

Junliangcheng Station (Chinese: 军粮城站) is a station of Line 9 of the Tianjin Metro. It started operations on 28 March 2004.
