= Dongxing Road station =

Metro station in Tianjin, China

Dongxing Road 东兴路
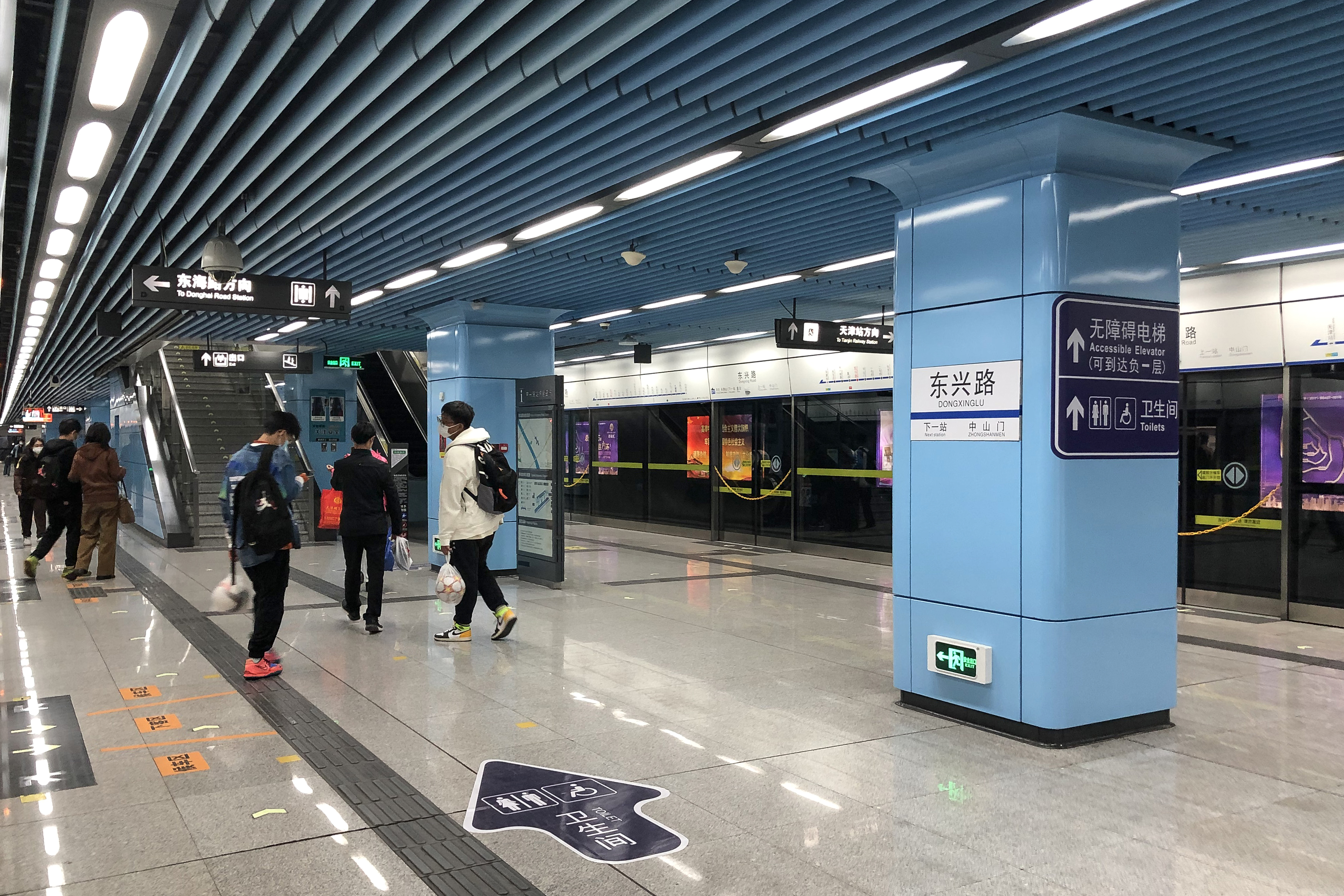

General information
- Location: Hedong District, Tianjin; China
- Coordinates: 39.1006°N 117.2386°E
- Operator: Binhai Mass Transit Co. Ltd.
- Line: Line 9

Construction
- Structure type: Underground

History
- Opened: 1 May 2011

Services
Preceding station	Tianjin Metro	Following station
Zhigu towards Tianjinzhan	Line 9	Zhongshanmen towards Donghailu
Location

Dongxing Road Station (Chinese: 东兴路站), also known as Dongxinglu Station, is a station of Line 9 of the Tianjin Metro. It started operations on 1 May 2011.
