= Yihaoqiao station =

Metro station in Tianjin, China

Yihaoqiao 一号桥
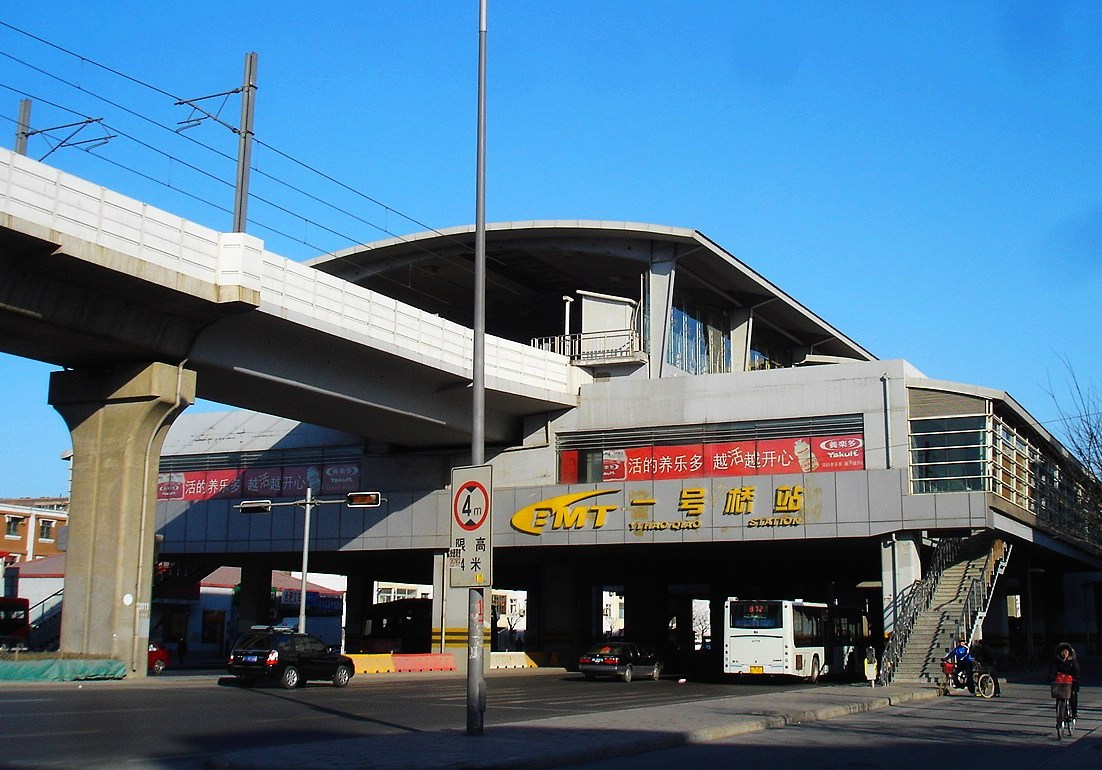

General information
- Location: Hedong District, Tianjin; China
- Coordinates: 39.0951°N 117.2766°E
- Operator: Binhai Mass Transit Co. Ltd.
- Line: Line 9

Construction
- Structure type: Elevated

History
- Opened: 28 March 2004

Services
Preceding station	Tianjin Metro	Following station
Zhongshanmen towards Tianjinzhan	Line 9	Erhaoqiao towards Donghailu
Location

Yihaoqiao Station (Chinese: 一号桥站) is a station of Line 9 of the Tianjin Metro. It started operations on 28 March 2004.
