= TEDA station =

Metro station in Tianjin, China

TEDA 泰达
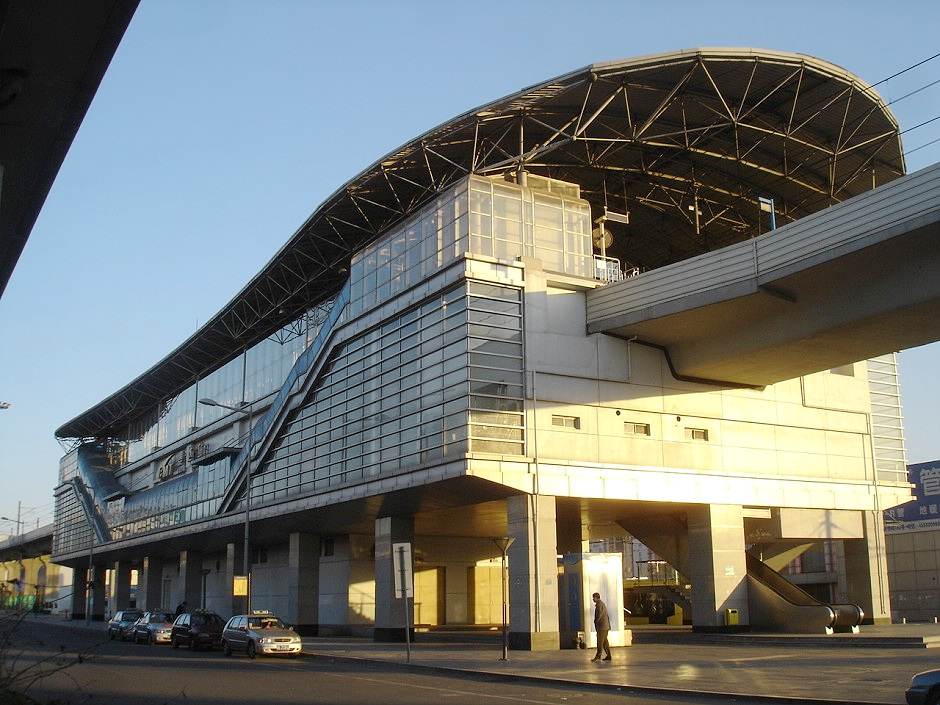

General information
- Location: Binhai District, Tianjin; China
- Coordinates: 39°1′29.0″N 117°40′23.1″E
- Operated by: Binhai Mass Transit Co. Ltd.
- Lines: Line 9; TEDA Tram; (formerly)

Construction
- Structure type: Elevated

History
- Opened: 28 March 2004

Services
Preceding station	Tianjin Metro	Following station
Tanggu towards Tianjinzhan	Line 9	Shiminguangchang towards Donghailu
Former services (closed 2023)
Terminus	TEDA Tram	First Avenue towards North of College District
Location

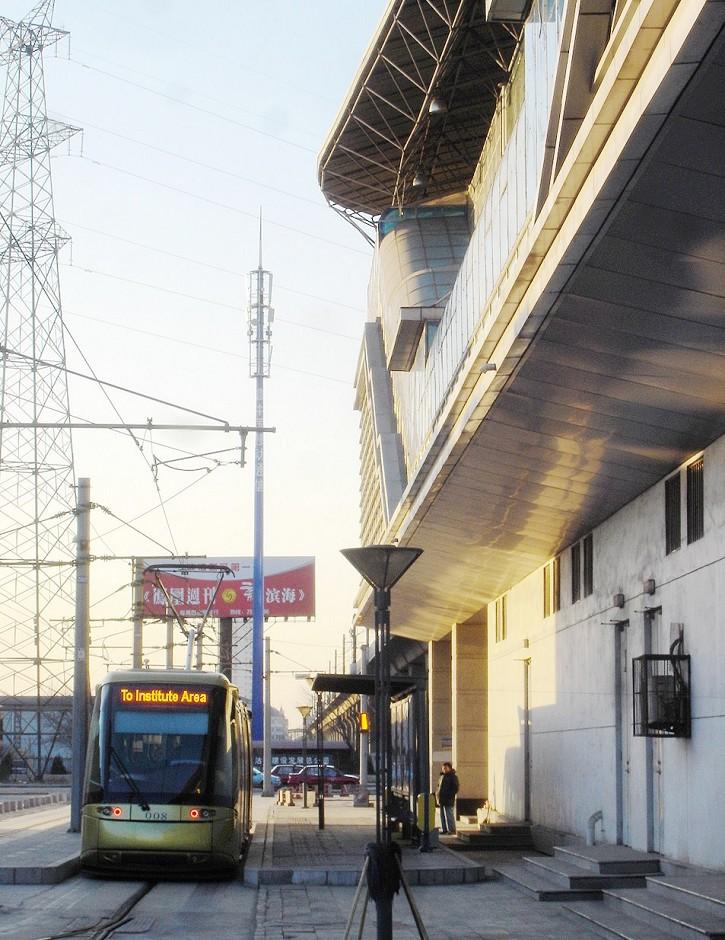
Train Line 1 interchange station outside TEDA Station

TEDA Station (Chinese: 泰达站), also known as Tianjin Economic-Technological Development Area Station and Taida Station, is a station of Line 9 of the Tianjin Metro. It started operations on 28 March 2004.
