= Tanggu station =

Metro station in Tianjin, China

Tanggu 塘沽
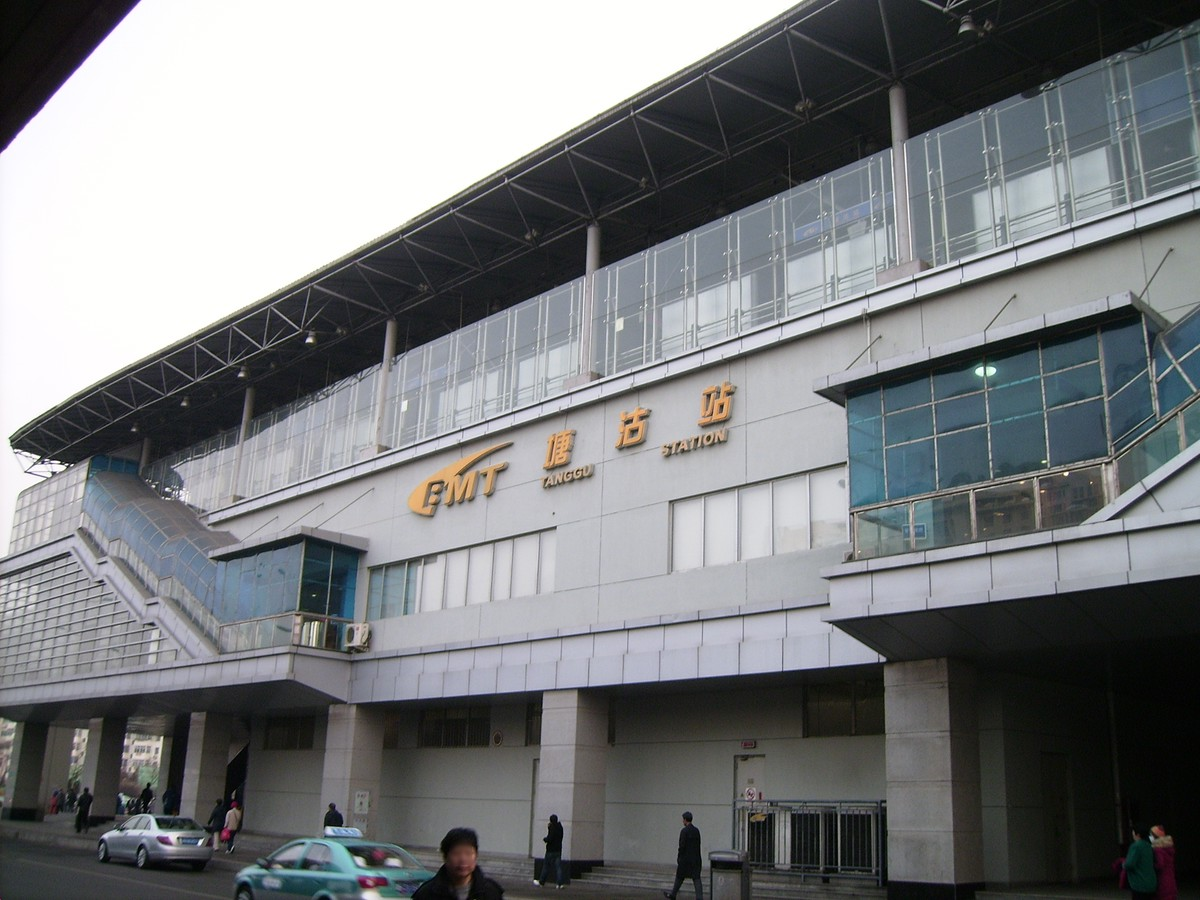

General information
- Location: Binhai District, Tianjin; China
- Coordinates: 39.0287°N 117.6550°E
- Operated by: Binhai Mass Transit Co. Ltd.
- Line: Line 9

Construction
- Structure type: Elevated

History
- Opened: 28 March 2004

Services
Preceding station	Tianjin Metro	Following station
Hujiayuan towards Tianjinzhan	Line 9	TEDA towards Donghailu
Location

Tanggu Station (Chinese: 塘沽站) is a station of Line 9 of the Tianjin Metro. It started operations on 28 March 2004.
