= Dawangzhuang station =

Metro station in Tianjin, China

Dawangzhuang 大王庄
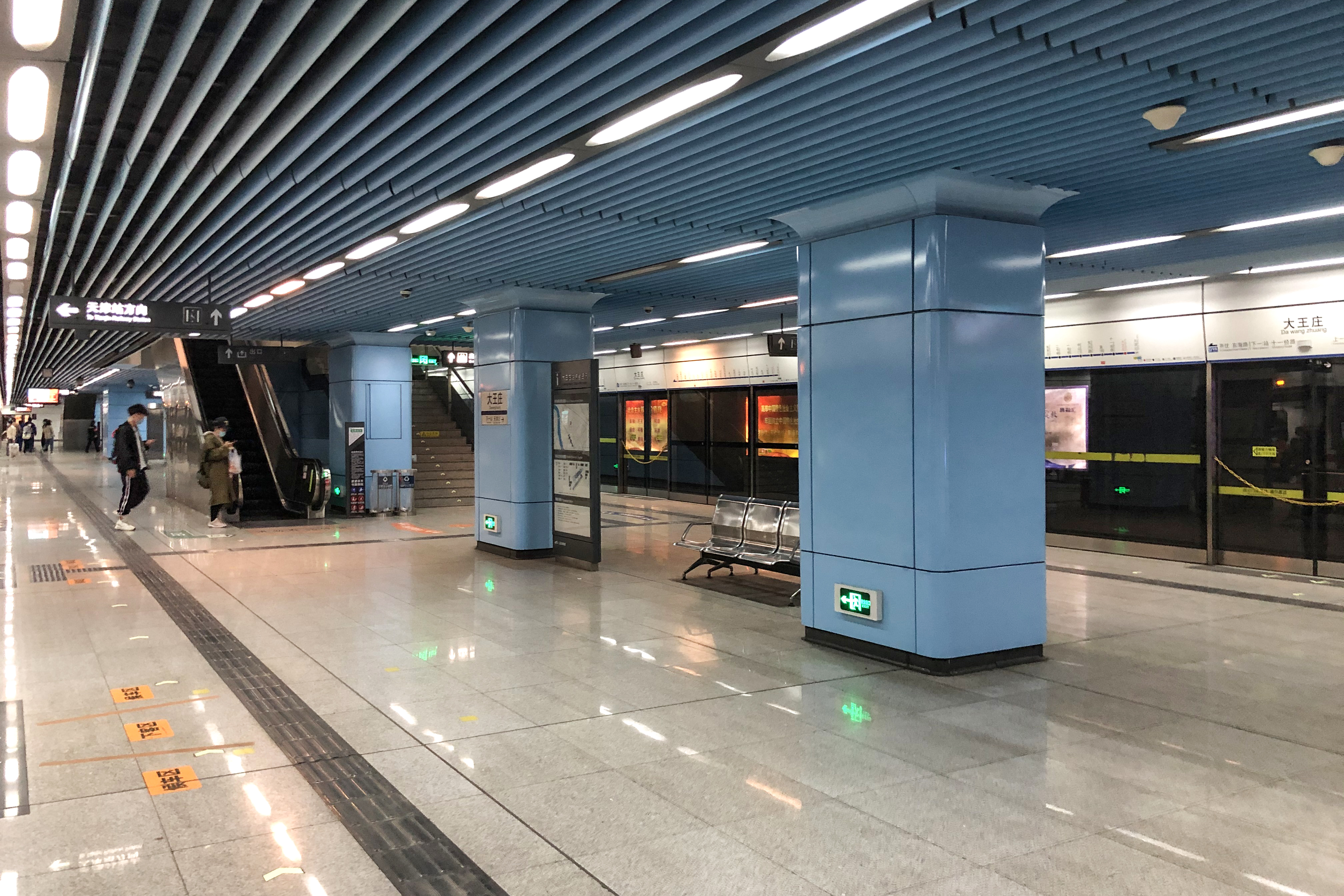

General information
- Location: Hedong District, Tianjin; China
- Coordinates: 39.12617°N 117.21193°E
- Operated by: Binhai Mass Transit Co. Ltd.
- Line: Line 9

Construction
- Structure type: Underground

History
- Opened: 15 October 2012

Services
Preceding station	Tianjin Metro	Following station
Tianjinzhan Terminus	Line 9	Shiyijinglu towards Donghailu
Location

Dawangzhuang Station (Chinese: 大王庄站) is a station of Line 9 of the Tianjin Metro. It started operations on 15 October 2012.
