= Huizhanzhongxin station (Tianjin Metro) =

Metro station in Tianjin, China

Huizhanzhongxin 会展中心
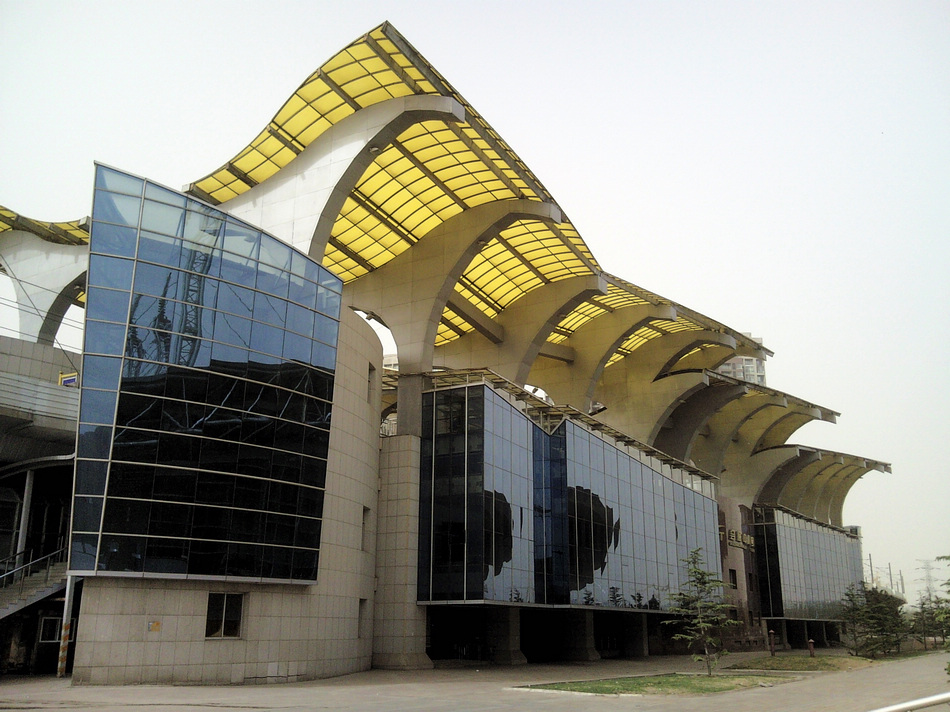

General information
- Location: Binhai District, Tianjin; China
- Coordinates: 39.0291°N 117.7254°E
- Operated by: Binhai Mass Transit Co. Ltd.
- Line: Line 9

Construction
- Structure type: Elevated

History
- Opened: 28 March 2004

Services
Preceding station	Tianjin Metro	Following station
Taihulu towards Tianjinzhan	Line 9	Donghailu Terminus
Location

Huizhanzhongxin Station (Chinese: 会展中心站), also known as Convention and Exhibition Center Station, is a station of Line 9 of the Tianjin Metro. It started operations on 28 March 2004.
