= Citizen Plaza station =

Metro station in Tianjin, China

Citizen Plaza 市民广场

General information
- Location: Binhai District, Tianjin; China
- Coordinates: 39°01′06″N 117°42′13″E
- Operated by: Binhai Mass Transit Co. Ltd.
- Line: Line 9

Construction
- Structure type: Elevated

History
- Opened: 28 March 2004

Services
Preceding station	Tianjin Metro	Following station
TEDA towards Tianjinzhan	Line 9	Taihulu towards Donghailu
Location

Citizen Plaza Station (Chinese: 市民广场站), also known as Shiminguangchang Station, is a station of Line 9 of the Tianjin Metro. It started operations on 28 March 2004.
