= Line 9 (Tianjin Metro) =

Metro line in Tianjin, China

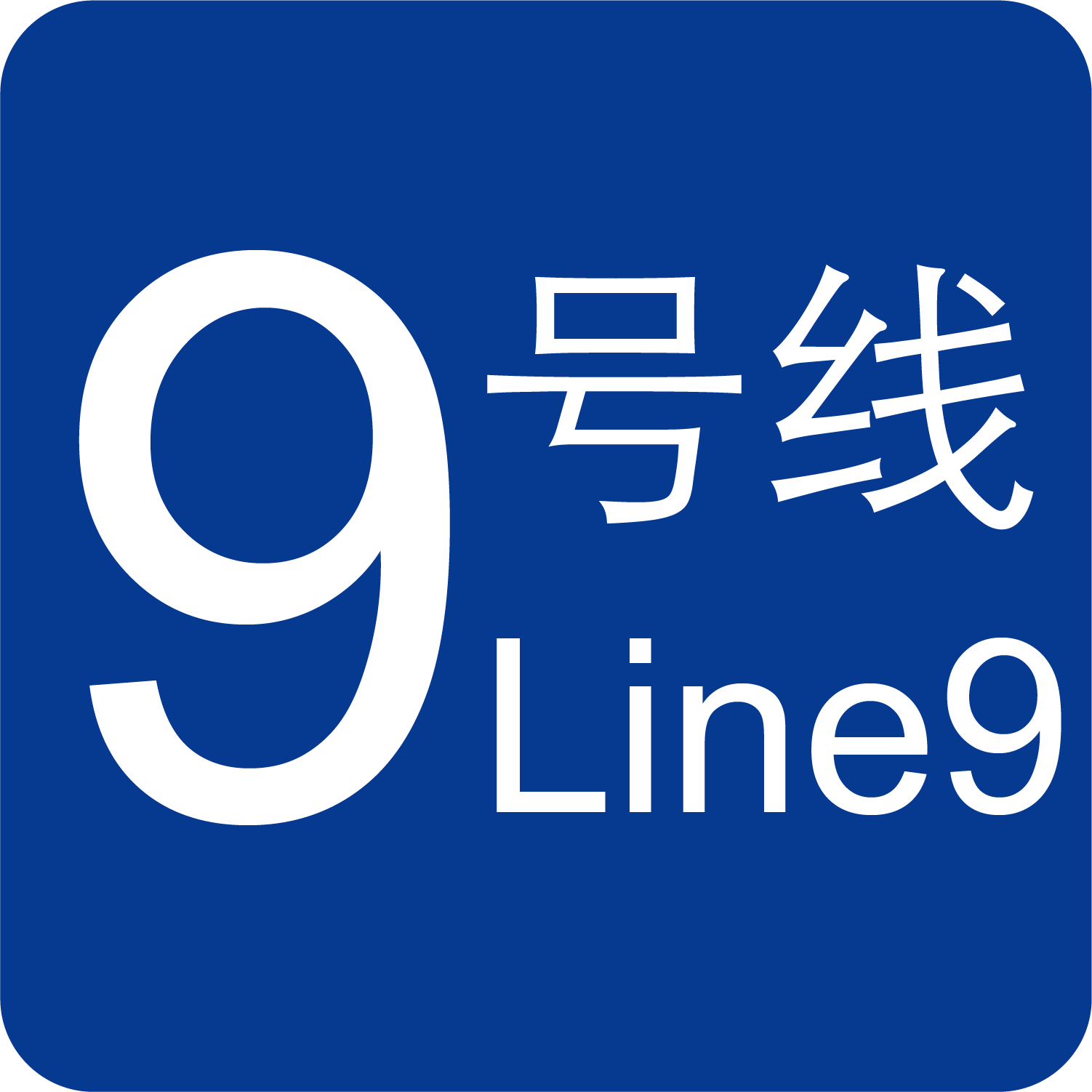

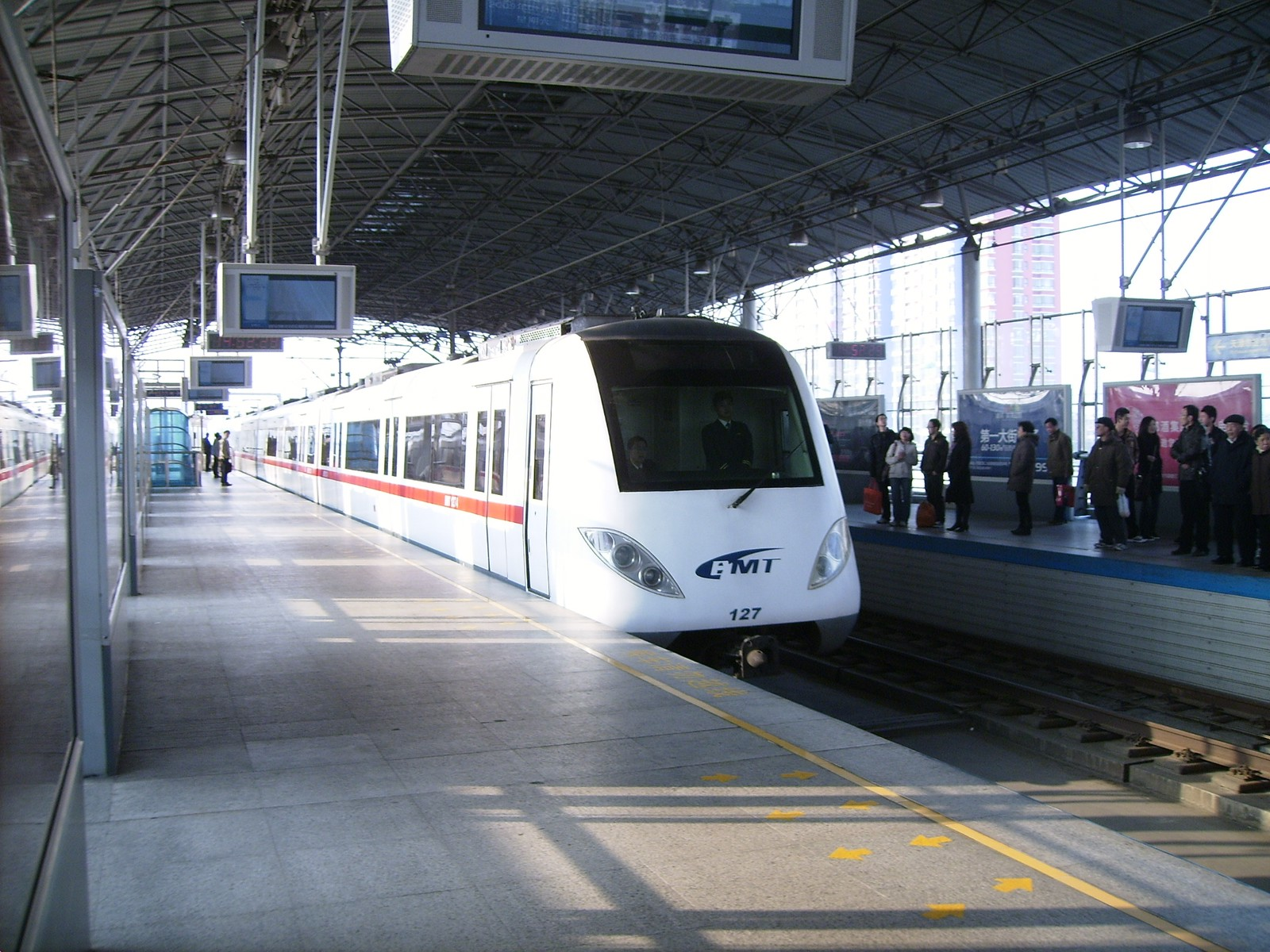
- A train at Tanggu

Overview
- Other name: Jinbin (Tianjin-Binhai) Light Rail (津滨轻轨) (Note: Not really a light rail. In China, elevated or at-grade metro lines always wrongly called "light rail". Only 6.67 km section on the line is underground.)
- Status: Operational
- Owner: Tianjin
- Locale: Tianjin, China
- Termini: Tianjinzhan; Donghailu
- Stations: 21

Service
- Type: Rapid transit
- System: Tianjin Metro
- Services: 1
- Operator(s): Train Service Center III, Tianjin Rail Transit Group Corporation
- Daily ridership: 97,000 (Avg.)

History
- Opened: 28 March 2004; 22 years ago

Technical
- Line length: 52.76 km (32.78 mi)
- Number of tracks: 2
- Character: Underground, At-grade, & Elevated
- Track gauge: 1,435 mm (4 ft 8 1/2 in)

Line 9 is a rapid transit line of the Tianjin Metro in Tianjin, China. It spans 52.8 km (32.8 mi) with 21 stations, connecting the urban area of Tianjin with Binhai New Area, a new area within the jurisdiction of Tianjin Municipality. The one-way journey time is approximately one hour.

Line 9 is run by Tianjin Binhai Mass Transit Development Co., Ltd, which became a subsidiary of Tianjin Rail Transit Group Corporation in 2017.

== Design ==
Most of the line is elevated and runs parallel to the Jinbin Expressway (only the westernmost 6.67 kilometres (4.14 mi) runs in tunnels). Hence, it is often wrongly called "light rail", as is commonplace in China with elevated or at-grade metro lines.

Trains can reach a speed of up to 100 kilometres per hour (62 mph). Of the 4 bridges along the line, the No. 1 and No. 4 bridges are longer and use ballastless track, while the No. 2 and No. 3 bridges use ballasted track. The No. 1 bridge, from Guanghua Road (between Dongxing Road and Zhongshanmen stations) to Babao, with a total length of 25.8 kilometres (16.0 mi), is the longest bridge used in rapid transit systems in China.

== History ==
Line 9 first opened on 28 March 2004. It was extended to Tianjinzhan on 15 October 2012, connecting with the main metro network by allowing passengers to transfer to Lines 2 and 3.

Train service on the whole line was suspended on 13 August 2015 after a series of massive explosions devastated the area. The explosions occurred less than a kilometre from Donghailu station; the roof of the station collapsed, and the control centre nearby was destroyed. It resumed operation on 16 December from Tianjin Railway Station to Tianjin Pipe Corporation Station.

=== Timeline ===
- 18 May 2001 - Construction begins
- 30 September 2003 - Construction completes
- 28 March 2004 - Trial service begins, 6 stations are open to service: Zhongshanmen, Donglikaifaqu, Gangguangongsi, Yanghuoshichang, Dongtinglu, and Donghailu. The price of the tickets are 3 yuan for less than 30 km (19 mi) or 5 yuan for greater than 30 km (19 mi). The first train departs at 07:00 and the last at 19:00. Hujiayuan is a special station only open to BMT staffs and Huizhanzhongxin station near TEDA football field is only open for football matches and other special events.
- 25 May 2004 - Yihaoqiao station opens for service
- 13 September 2004 - Extends open time to 06:30 - 19:00
- 18 October 2004 - Shiminguangchang station opens
- 27 March 2005 - Huizhanzhongxin station opens on normal days
- 28 April 2005 - Erhaoqiao station opens, Yihaoqiao station closes. Automatic ticket selling and checking system begins use. The price of a ticket changes to 2, 3, 4, 5, or 6 yuan, depending on the travel distance. Extends open time to 06:30 - 20:00.
- Late 2005 or early 2006 - Yanghuoshichang station changed name to Tanggu; Dongtinglu changed name to TEDA.
- 1 March 2006 - Yihaoqiao station reopens; Xinlizhen, Xiaodongzhuang, Junliangcheng, Hujiayuan stations open, so all 14 stations that have been constructed are open.
- 28 March 2006 - At 11 a.m., the trains begin automatic train operation; the total travel time from Zhongshanmen to Donghailu decreases from 49 min to 47.5 min.
- 1 May 2006 - Extends open time to 06:30 - 21:00.
- 1 May 2010 - Shiyijing Road to Zhongshanmen was opened
- 12 August 2015 - the 2015 Tianjin explosions caused significant damage; all operations are suspended.
- 16 December 2015 - Tianjin Railway Station to Tianjin Pipe Corp Station section resumes operation. The operation time is 06:00 - 22:30.
- Early 2016 - Tianjin Pipe Corp Station to Citizen Plaza section resumes operation.
- 31 December 2016 - Citizen Plaza to Donghai Road section resumes operation.

=== Chronology of section openings ===
Segment	Commencement	Length	Station(s)	Name
Zhongshanmen — Donghai Road	28 March 2004	45.409 km (28.22 mi)	9	Phase 1
Yihaoqiao	25 May 2004	Infill station	1	
Citizen Plaza	18 October 2004	Infill station	1	
Convention and Exhibition Center	27 March 2005	Infill station	1	
Erhaoqiao	28 April 2005	Infill station	1	
Hujiayuan	1 June 2006	Infill station	1	
Shiyijing Road — Zhongshanmen	1 May 2011	6.151 km (3.82 mi)	3	Phase 2 (1st section)
Tianjin — Shiyijing Road	15 October 2012	1.2 km (0.75 mi)	2	Phase 2 (2nd section)
Tianjin Pipe Corporation — Donghai Road	16 December 2015	Temporary ceased operation	-6	Explosions reconstruction project
Tianjin Pipe Corporation — Citizen Plaza	27 June 2016	Reentered operation	5	Explosions reconstruction project
Citizen Plaza — Donghai Road	31 December 2016	Reentered operation	1	Explosions reconstruction project
Zhangguizhuang, Taihu Road	31 December 2016	Infill stations	2	

== Stations (west to east) ==
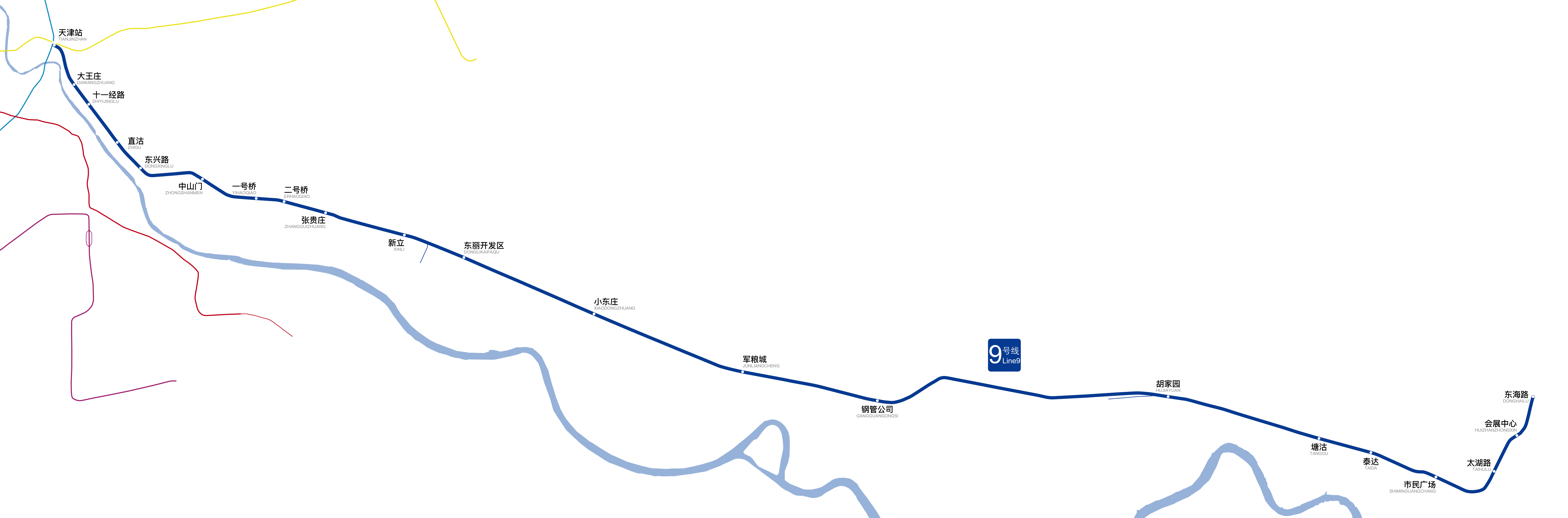
Line 9 drawn to scale.

Service routes:

- Tianjin Railway Station - Donghai Road
- Tianjin Railway Station - Zhigu - Tanggu through train, runs twice on each directions, of which the 05:55 train from Tianjinzhan will continue to Donghailu (↓)

Service routes		Station name		Connections	Bus Connections	Distance km		Location
Service routes		English	Chinese	Connections	Bus Connections	Distance km		Location
●	●	Tianjinzhan	天津站	TJP	5 8 8区间 13 24 27 28 35 35区间 50 96 96区间 97 150大圈 156 158 176 181 182 185 186 186快线 187 188 188盘山旅游专线 195 196 198 199 461 462航母旅游专线 462专线 468 528 570快线 570专线 574 607 621 634 635 638 639东线 639西线 645 645区间 651 660 663 666 672 676 701 749 760 802 806 808 813 824 827 828 832 836 868 905 951 953 961 观光3 国展定制2线 环球影城直通车 机场穿梭车 机场大巴天津站 机场天津站线 京津城际商务班车 跨城穿梭车 通勤570 通勤832 小187路低速线	0.00	0.00	Hedong
●	|	Dawangzhuang	大王庄		176 185 621 651 676 806	1.40	1.40	Hedong
●	|	Shiyijinglu	十一经路		92 600内环 600外环 643 673 803 840 842 847 862 866 871 902 963 机场专线4 通勤842 通学1	0.74	2.14	Hedong
●	●	Zhigu	直沽	Tianjin Metro Line 5	92 369 511 608 642 643 665 668 673 760 840 860 962 通学2 专线678	1.54	3.68	Hedong
●	|	Dongxinglu	东兴路		760 840	1.08	4.76	Hedong
●	|	Zhongshanmen	中山门		30 30区间 185 503 621 642 643 656 668 673 806 830 840 856 857 860 872 905 通勤872	2.02	6.78	Hedong
●	|	Yihaoqiao	一号桥	(OSI via Longhandao)	30 30区间 185 503 621 639东线 679 706 715 806 830 840 856 857 860 872 观光3 通勤715 通勤872	1.73	8.51	Hedong
●	|	Erhaoqiao	二号桥		30 30区间 185 503 621 639东线 679 706 715 806 819 830 840 856 857 860 872 观光3 通勤715 通勤872	0.90	9.41	Hedong
●	|	Zhangguizhuang	张贵庄		30 185 503 679 706 715 806 819 830 840 856 857 872 通勤872	1.32	10.73	Dongli
●	|	Xinli	新立		185 679 690西线 716 806 830 856	2.51	13.24	Dongli
●	|	Donglikaifaqu	东丽开发区		185 503 621 715 716 751 806 830 835 856 东丽开发区1 东丽开发区2 通勤305东线 通勤305西线 通勤716	1.98	15.22	Dongli
●	|	Xiaodongzhuang	小东庄		185 503 621 716 835 国展定制4线	4.32	19.54	Dongli
●	|	Junliangcheng	军粮城		185 503 621 717 720 780 定制36	4.92	24.46	Dongli
●	|	Gangguangongsi	钢管公司		126 185 211 307 503 621 835 931	4.25	28.71	Dongli
●	|	Hujiayuan	胡家园			6.16	38.00	Binhai
●	●	Tanggu	塘沽		103 108 108专线 109 110 113 118 124 132 133 134 134通勤快车 145 166 167 501 501晚间线 502 503 507 524 605 651 825 834 835 880 936 941 宝坻塘沽专线 机场专线2	4.81	42.81	Binhai
●	↓	TEDA	泰达		506 931 955	1.64	44.45	Binhai
●	↓	Shiminguangchang	市民广场		101 937 940 旅游专线1	2.21	46.66	Binhai
●	↓	Taihulu	太湖路		508内环 521	2.18	48.84	Binhai
●	↓	Huizhanzhongxin	会展中心		130 130快线 508内环 508外环 524 820 934	1.35	50.19	Binhai
●	↓	Donghailu	东海路		117 127航母 137 503 505 508内环 508外环 509 518内环 518外环 935 滨海中关村摆渡车	1.31	51.50	Binhai

== Rolling stock ==
Type	Time of manufacturing	Series	Sets	Assembly	Notes
Type B	2003 - 2010	DKZ7	38	Mcp+T+T+Mcp	Manufactured by CRRC Changchun Railway Vehicles
Type B	2024 - 2025	SFM134	10	Mcp+T+T+Mcp	Manufactured by CRRC Qingdao Sifang

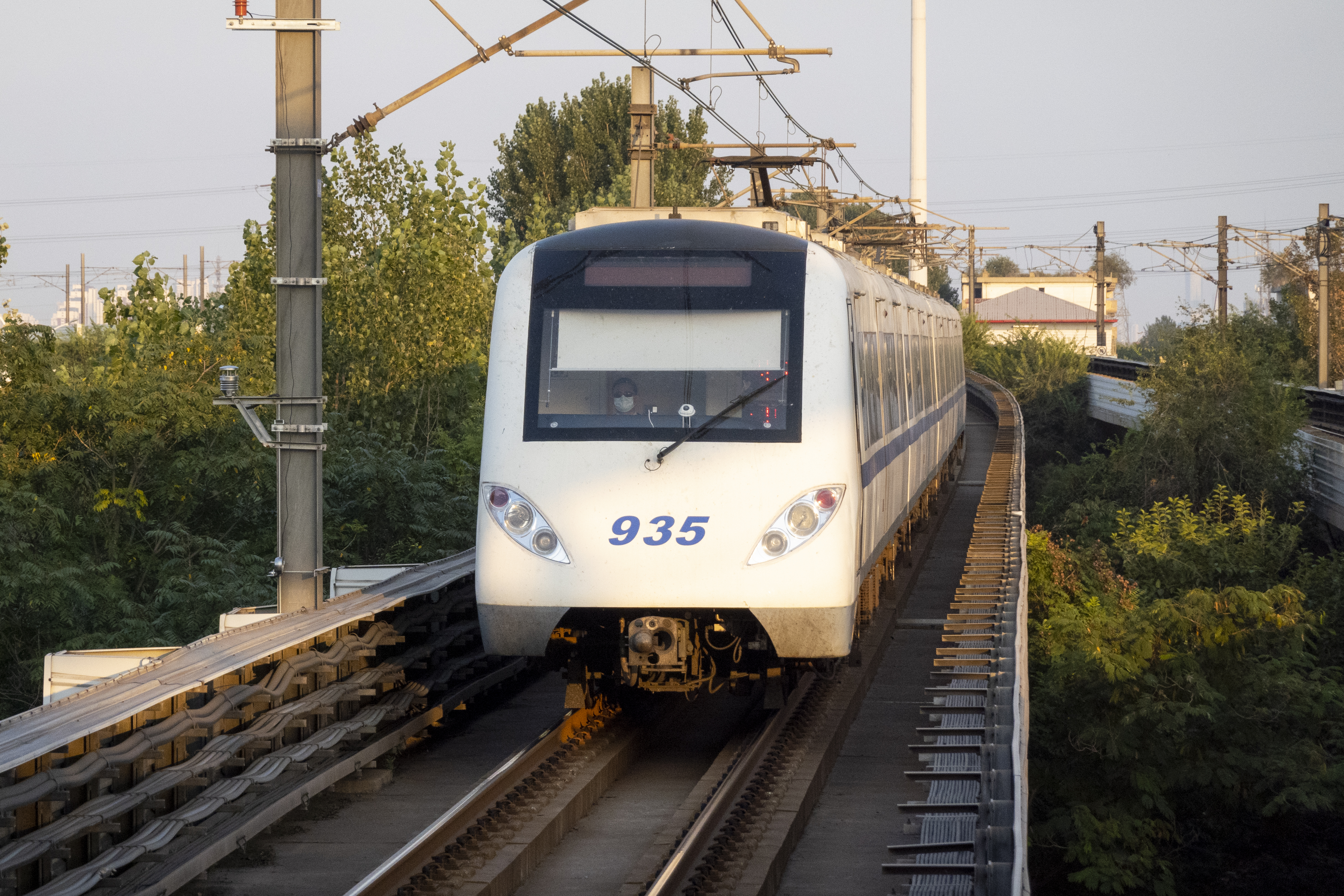
DKZ7 train

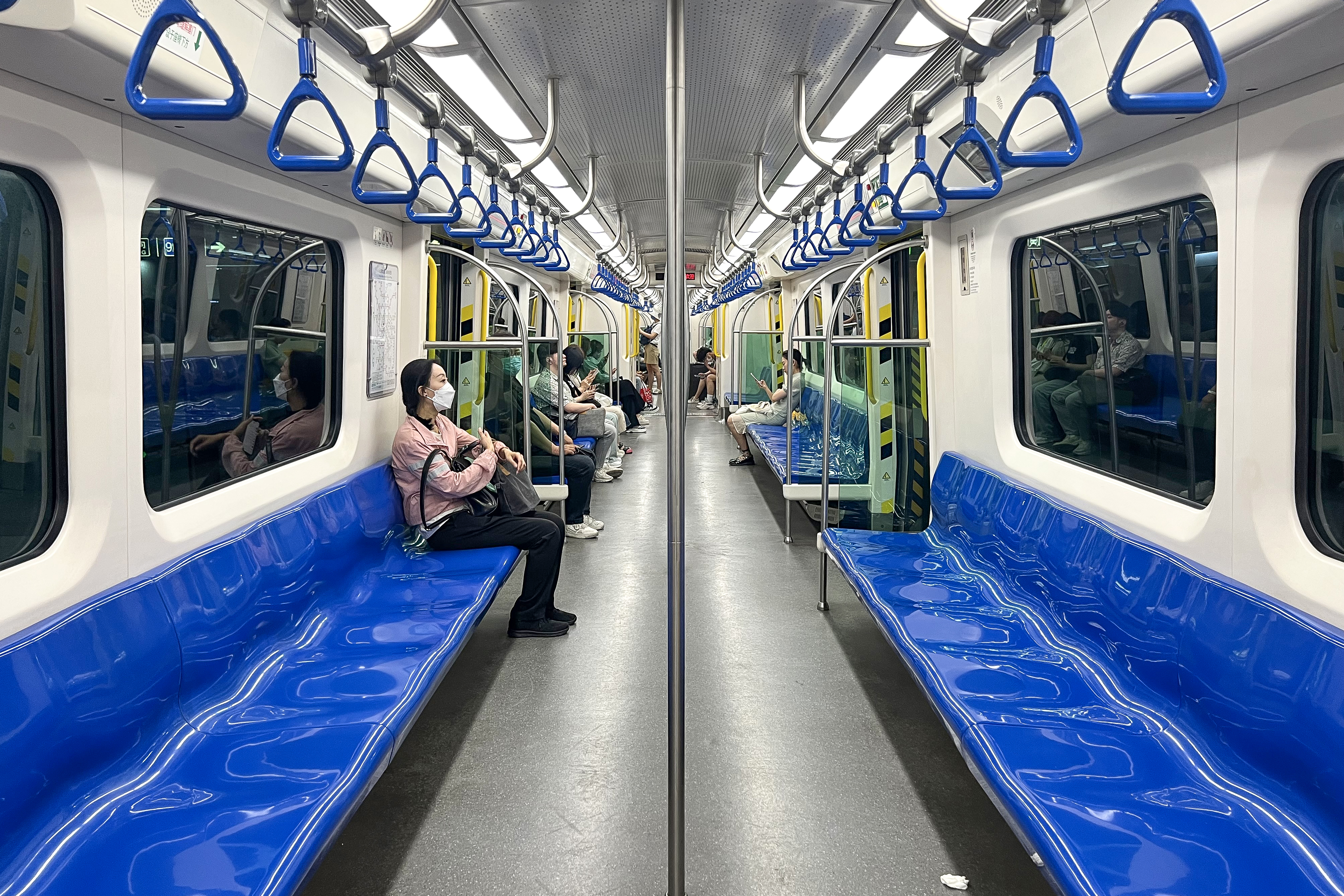
DKZ7 train interior

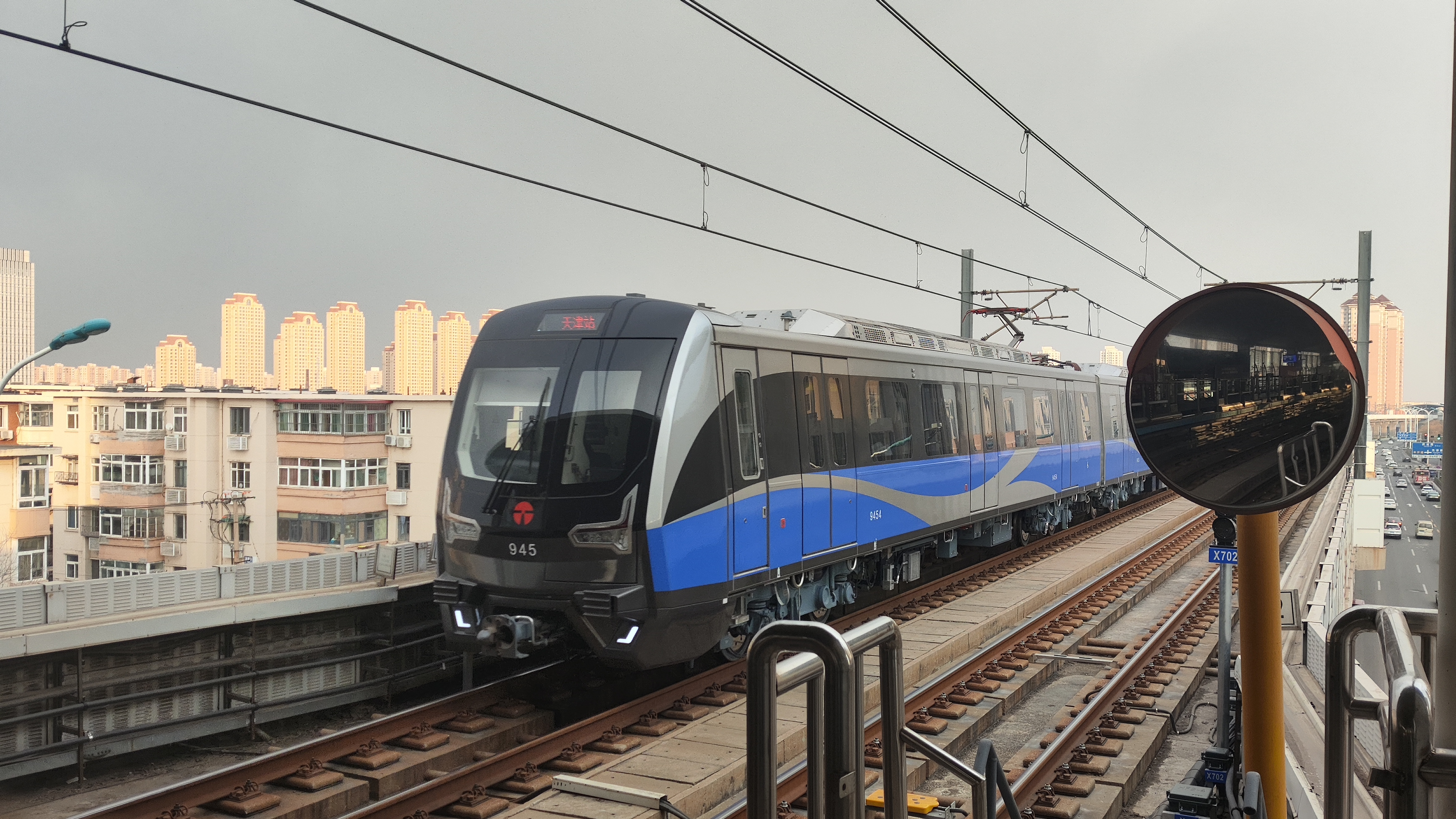
SFM134 train

The set BMT-122 was damaged in an explosion accident on 12 August 2015, but was repaired and overhauled. Before it backed to service, it has been changed set number to 922.
