= Jinjing line =

Suburban rail line in Tianjin, China

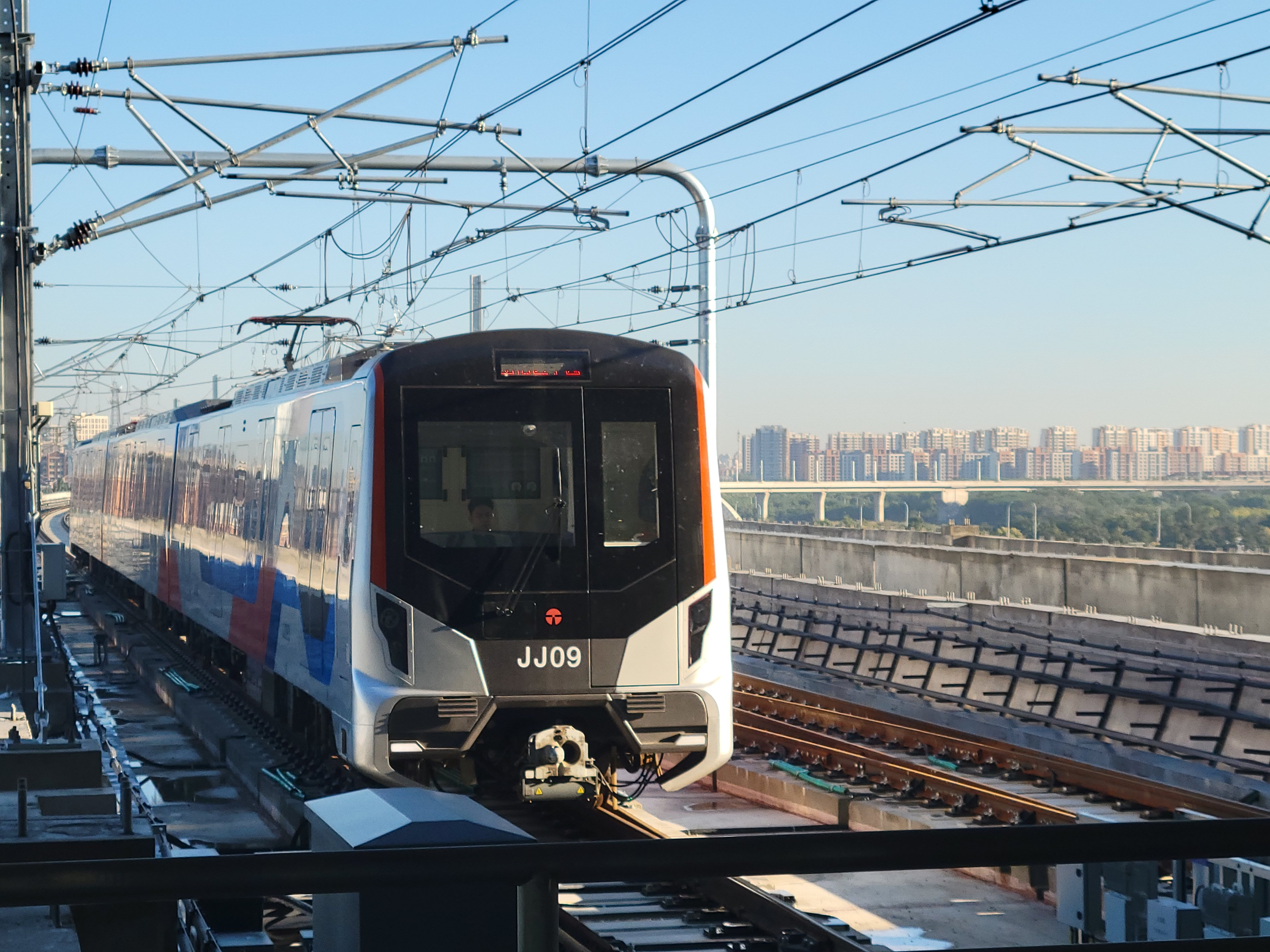
- Jinjing line train at Jingwu station

Overview
- Other names: Jinghai Suburban Railway; Tianjin-Jinghai Suburban Railway
- Status: Operational
- Owner: Tianjin
- Locale: Tianjin, China
- Termini: Jinghuadongdao; Tuanboyixueyuan
- Stations: 4

Service
- Type: Suburban railway, Rapid transit
- System: Tianjin Metro
- Services: 1
- Operator(s): Train Service Center III, Tianjin Rail Transit Group Corporation

History
- Opened: 28 September 2024; 2 years ago

Technical
- Line length: 13.4 km (8.33 mi)
- Number of tracks: 2
- Character: Underground and elevated
- Track gauge: 1,435 mm (4 ft 8 1/2 in)
- Electrification: Overhead line with 1,500 V DC

The Jinjing line (Chinese: 津静线; pinyin: Jīnjìngxiàn) of the Tianjin Metro, also known as Jinghai Suburban railway, is a 13.4 km long suburban rail line in southwestern Tianjin. Construction of Jinjing line started on 11 February 2021. Test run started on 5 June 2024. The line is opened for service on 28 September 2024.

== Stations ==
Station name		Connections	Distance km	Location
English	Chinese	Connections	Distance km	Location
Through train to Beichenkejiyuanbei.
Jinghuadongdao	京华东道	Tianjin Metro Line 5		Xiqing
Jingwu	精武			Xiqing
Tuanbojiankangcheng	团泊健康城			Jinghai
Tuanboyixueyuan	团泊医学园			Jinghai
