= TEDA Modern Guided Rail Tram =

Guided tram line in Binhai New Area of Tianjin, China

Coordinates: 39°03′21″N 117°41′28″E

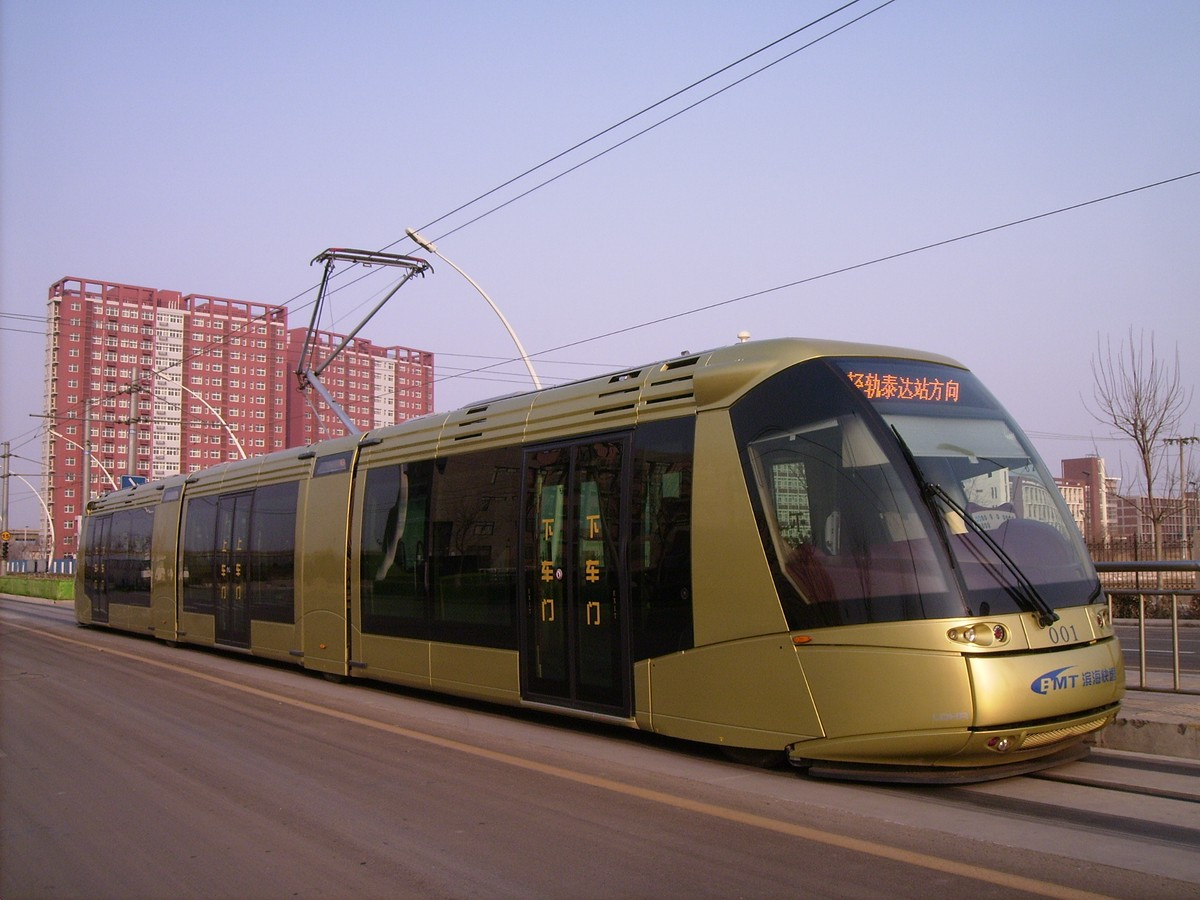
- TEDA MGRT Tram

Overview
- Status: Closed
- Owner: Tianjin
- Locale: Tianjin, China
- Termini: TEDA; North of College District
- Stations: 14

Service
- Type: Translohr
- System: Tianjin Metro
- Services: 1
- Operator(s): Tianjin Binhai Mass Transit Development Co., Ltd. (As a subsidiary of Tianjin Rail Transit Group Corporation since 2017)

History
- Opened: 10 May 2007; 19 years ago
- Closed: 1 June 2023; 3 years ago

Technical
- Line length: 7.86 km (4.88 mi)
- Number of tracks: 2
- Character: At-grade
- Track gauge: None, central guide rail
- Electrification: 750 V DC Overhead lines
- Operating speed: 80 km/h (50 mph)

TEDA Modern Guided Rail Tram (Chinese: 天津开发区导轨电车; pinyin: Tiānjīn Kāifāqū Dǎoguǐ Diànchē) was a Translohr Light Rail line in Tianjin Economic-Technological Development Area (TEDA). It operated from 2007 to 2023, as rubber-tyred tram line, the first in Asia. The line was a part of the Tianjin Metro system. It was run by Tianjin Binhai Mass Transit Development Co., Ltd, which has been a subsidiary of Tianjin Rail Transit Group Corporation since 2017.

Tianjin once had a conventional steel-wheeled tramway network. The system gradually expanded and reached its peak in 1933 with 116 tramcars, was however abandoned in 1972.

== History ==
The TEDA industrial zone is Tianjin's fastest developing area. A public transport system to overcome traffic congestion was considered necessary.

Construction began in 2005. The 7.86 km (4.88 mi) long line was opened to the public in 2007, making it the first LRT system in mainland China. It was run by Tianjin Binhai Mass Transit Development Co., Ltd, which has been a subsidiary of Tianjin Rail Transit Group Corporation since 2017. The total cost of the project was estimated at 500 million yuan, of which 190 million yuan were used for engineering test-line (excluding vehicles).

Once operational, the line quickly became popular amongst locals.

As of June 2023, the TEDA Guided Tram has suspended operations for scheduled maintenance.

On 19 July 2023, the transportation and construction management department of TEDA opened a project bidding announcement for removal of both overhead line, the single guide rail and restoration of the road surface.

== Timeline ==
- 1972 – Abandonment of original tram network as construction on the city's subway system began
- 2005 – Construction of rubber-tired LRT started
- 2006 – First test run
- 2007 – Opened to public on May 10, 2007

| Segment | Date opened | Length |
|---|---|---|
| TEDA — North of College District | 10 May 2007 | 7.860 km (4.88 mi) |

== Practical Info ==
- Total length – 8 km
- Operating hours – 5:30 A.M. to 12 Midnight
- Frequency – 3 minutes

== Fleet ==
The LRVs for the line were manufactured by Translohr of France. All LRVs were low-floor, fully air-conditioned, and could run at a speed up to 80 kmph. Each LRV had three sections (Translohr STE 3).

== Stations (south to north) ==
The line ran on unreserved tracks, mostly in the middle of the road. It crossed many numerical avenues of TEDA and the college district. All stations had island platforms.

| Station name | | Connections | Location |
| English | Chinese | Connections | Location |
|---|---|---|---|
| TEDA | 泰达 | Tianjin Metro Line 9 | Binhai |
| First Avenue | 第一大街 | | Binhai |
| Second Avenue | 第二大街 | | Binhai |
| Third Avenue | 第三大街 | | Binhai |
| Fourth Avenue | 第四大街 | | Binhai |
| Fifth Avenue | 第五大街 | | Binhai |
| Sixth Avenue | 第六大街 | | Binhai |
| Seventh Avenue | 第七大街 | | Binhai |
| Ninth Avenue | 第九大街 | | Binhai |
| Tenth Avenue | 第十大街 | | Binhai |
| Eleventh Avenue | 第十一大街 | | Binhai |
| International Joint Academy | 联合研究院 | | Binhai |
| College District | 学院区 | | Binhai |
| North of College District | 学院区北 | | Binhai |

== See also ==
- Automated guideway transit
- Guide rail
- List of rubber-tyred tram systems
- Tianjin Metro
- Tianjin Suburban Railway (Tianjin–Jizhou railway)
- Trams in Tianjin - the first generation tramway network
- Zhangjiang Tram - rubber-tired LRT in Shanghai
