= Tianjin Metro =

Rapid transit system of Tianjin, China

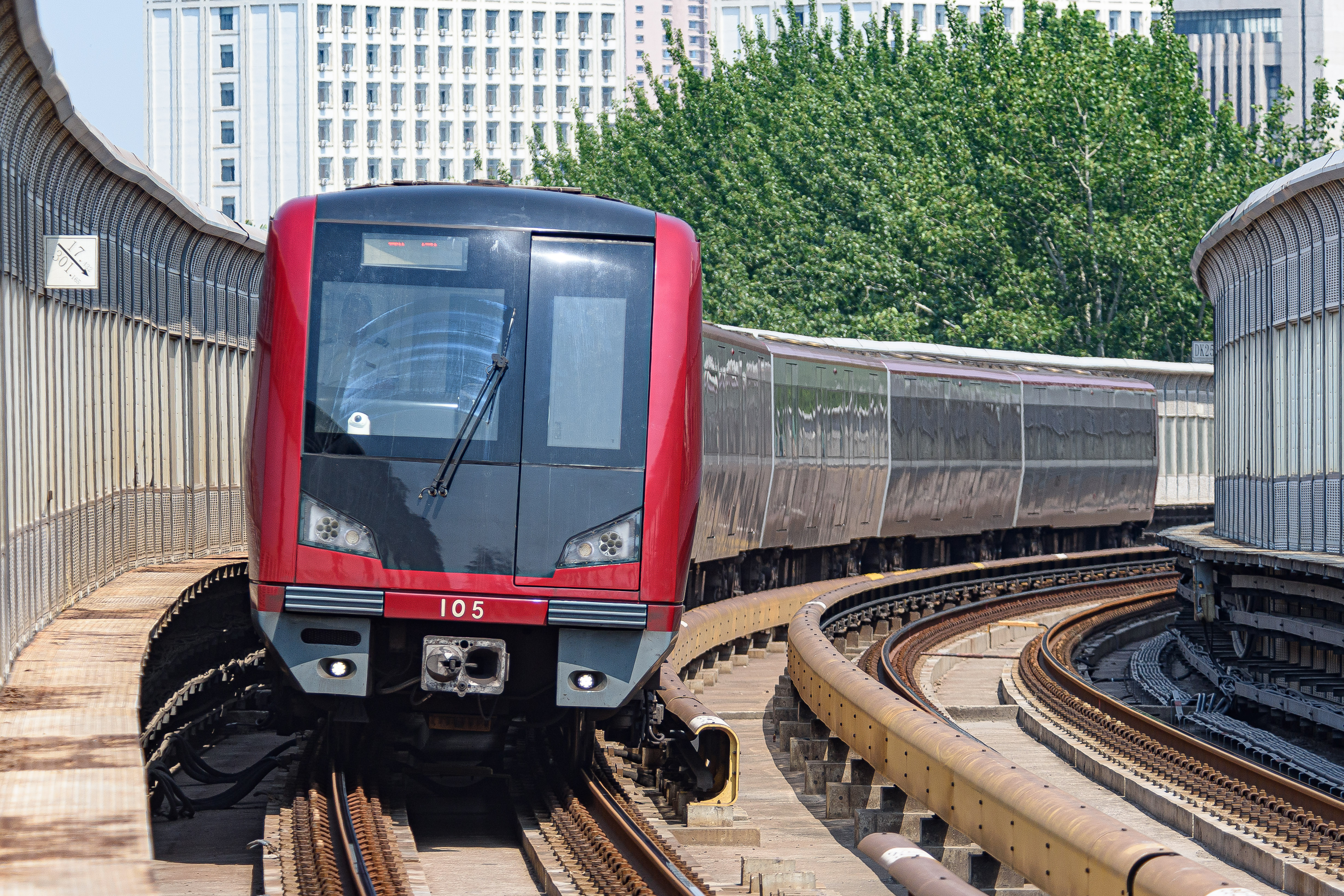
- Line 1 train

Overview
- Locale: Tianjin
- Transit type: Rapid transit
- Number of lines: 13
- Number of stations: 258
- Daily ridership: 1.8469 million (2025 Avg.); 3.3234 million (31 December 2025 peak)
- Annual ridership: 674 million (2025)
- Website: http://www.tjgdjt.com

Operation
- Began operation: 28 December 1984; 41 years ago (original system); 12 June 2006; 20 years ago (new system)
- Ended operation: 9 October 2001; 25 years ago (original system)
- Operator: Tianjin Rail Transit Group Corporation

Technical
- System length: 370 km (230 mi)
- Track gauge: 1,435 mm (4 ft 8 1/2 in) standard gauge
- Electrification: 750 V Third rail (lines 1-3) 1500 V Overhead line (other lines)
System map

Tianjin Metro
- Simplified Chinese: 天津地铁
- Traditional Chinese: 天津地鐵
Transcriptions
Standard Mandarin
- Hanyu Pinyin: Tiānjīn dìtiě

Evolution of the Tianjin Metro

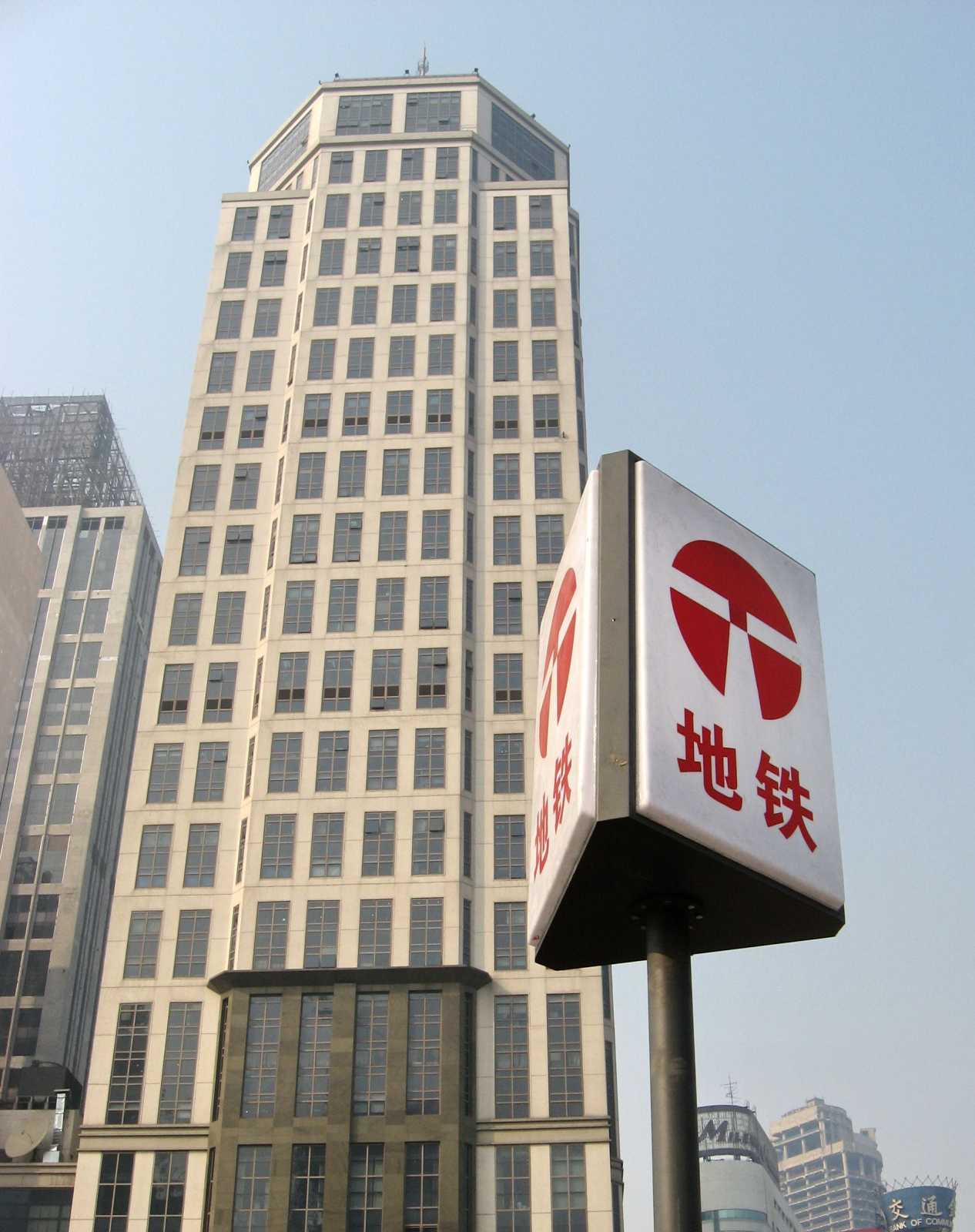
Metro sign at Yingkoudao station

The Tianjin Metro or Tianjin Rail Transit is the rapid transit system in the city of Tianjin, which was the second city in mainland China after Beijing to operate a subway system (the Beijing Subway opened in 1971). First opened in 1984, the system currently has 13 operating lines and 258 stations spanning 370 km (230 mi).

== History ==
Tianjin, as an inland harbor of China, has long been a major commercial city. After the founding of the People's Republic in 1949, the number of vehicles on the roads significantly increased, causing pollution. To overcome these problems, the transport authority decided to close the old tram network and switch over to a rapid transit system.

However, due to cost, it was not until 1970 that construction of the system first took place. The first section, spanning 3.6 km (2.2 mi) of track and 4 stations (Xinhualu, Yingkoudao, Anshandao and Haiguangsi), was completed by February 1976. Further construction was delayed due to an earthquake in 1976. The second section, with an additional 1.6 km (0.99 mi) of track and the Xinanjiao and Erweilu stations, was completed by 1980. After construction resumed, the total length was 7.4 km (4.6 mi), with 8 stations, and service on the line began on 28 December 1984.

To reduce construction costs, the transport authority decided to use an abandoned canal bed to form part of the system, and did not dig deeply. By using the canal bed, the underground section is only 2–3 meters (6 ft 7 in – 9 ft 10 in) under the street surface, and was the world's shallowest metro. There were only 1,000 full-time construction workers at that time; the others were volunteers from factories, schools and institutions all over the city. The average number of volunteer workers exceeded 2,000 a day, which rendered the project unique in the world then. Construction was delayed in 1976 when an earthquake hit the city, but was resumed in 1979 and completed by 1984.

At the end of the 1990s, it was observed that the Metro system was quite out of date. The atmosphere of the stations was uninviting, difficult to navigate, and with few passenger amenities on the platforms. Trains were infrequent, sporadic, and commonly delayed. The trains themselves were dilapidated, seat covers often torn off, and dim. Taking into consideration more modern, cleaner systems in East Asia, a massive reconstruction, modernization and expansion plan was laid out in 2000. In preparation, the system was closed on 1 September 2001, with renovation starting on 21 November of the same year. After purchasing new rolling stock, adding half-height platform screen doors and extending the line up to Shuanglin, the line re-opened on 6 December 2006 as Line 1, after trial testing that began on 12 June of that year.

During the renovation of the first line, other lines underwent construction. Line 9, operated by Binhai Mass Transit Development Co. Ltd, began construction in 2001 and its first section opened on 28 March 2004. Between 2004 and 2007, many new stations on the line opened successively. On 1 May 2011, the line was further extended westwards by 3 stations, bringing it to its current length of 52.8 km (32.8 mi). The Tram line in the system, the TEDA Modern Guided Rail Tram, was built to serve the Tianjin Economic Development Area and was opened on 10 May 2007. Line 2, after a lengthy construction delay and a structural accident, finally opened, as two separate sections, to the public on 1 July 2012, with the sections being reconnected on 28 August 2013. Line 3, another main north–south line, opened in October 2012.

Historically, the lines were jointly operated by two companies: the Tianjin Metro Group Co. operated lines 1, 2, 3, 6, and 10, while the Binhai Mass Transit Development Co. operated lines 5 and 9. In 2017, the two companies were merged into the Tianjin Rail Transit Group Co. (TRT), unifying operations.

== Lines ==
Map of operational lines of Tianjin Metro. TEDA Modern Guided Rail Tram (closed in 2023) is not included in the map.

Line	Terminals (District)		Commencement	Newest Extension	Length km	Stations	Operator
Line 1	Shuangqiaohe (Jinnan)	Liuyuan (Beichen)	1984	2024	42.227	29	
Line 2	Caozhuang (Xiqing)	Binhaiguojijichang (Dongli)	2012	2014	27.157	20	
Line 3	Xiaodian (Beichen)	Nanzhan (Xiqing)	2012	2013	33.7	26	
Line 4 (South)	Dongnanjiao (Heping)	Xinxingcun (Dongli)	2021	—N/a	19.4	14	
Line 4 (North)	Xiaojie (Beichen)	Xizhan (Hongqiao)	2025	—N/a	19.85	16	
Line 5	Beichenkejiyuanbei (Beichen)	Jinghuadongdao (Xiqing)	2018	2024	36.1	29	
Line 6	Nansunzhuang (Dongli)	Lushuidao (Jinnan)	2016	2021	43.6	39	
Line 7	Gulou (Nankai)	Saidalu (Xiqing)	2025	—N/a	21.82	15	
Line 8	Lushuidao (Jinnan)	Xianshuiguxi (Jinnan)	2021	—N/a	13.42	9	
Line 9	Tianjinzhan (Hebei)	Donghailu (Binhai)	2004	2012	52.759	21	
Line 10	Yutai (Xiqing)	Yudongcheng (Dongli)	2022	—N/a	21.18	21	
Line 11	Dongjiangdao (Hexi)	Dongliliujinglu (Dongli)	2023	2024	23.8	21	
Jinjing line	Jinghuadongdao (Xiqing)	Tuanboyixueyuan (Jinghai)	2024	—N/a	13.2	4	
Line Z4	Zhaishang (Binhai)	Beitang (Binhai)	2026	—N/a	23.7	10	
Total					370.3	258	

=== Line 1 ===
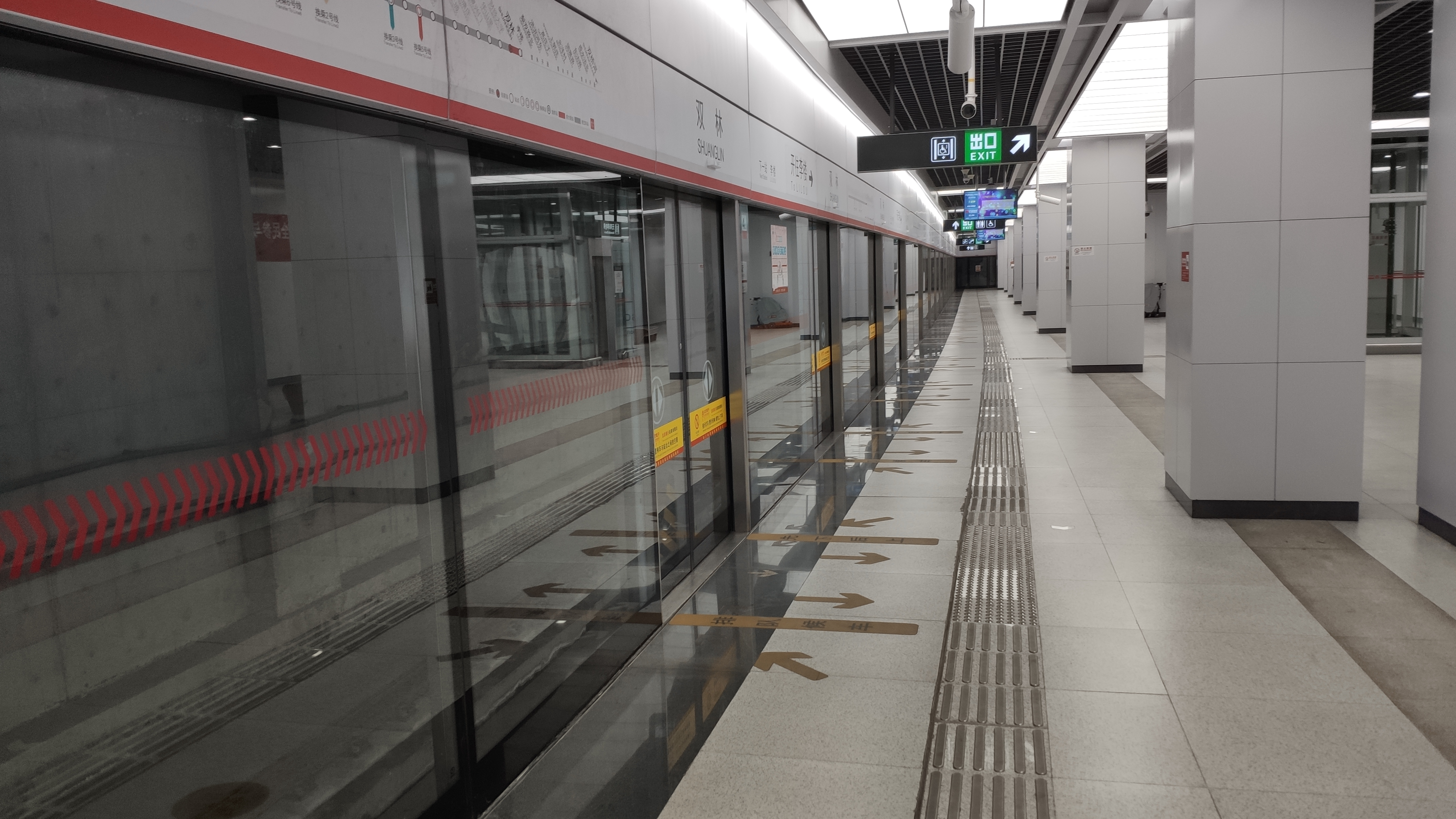
Shuanglin station of Line 1

Line 1 is built upon the old surface-level line, and was opened in 2006. It is 42.227 km (26.2 mi) with 32 stations (currently 29 stations in operation). The old at-grade Shuanglin station was closed on 28 December 2016 and reopened as a new underground station on 3 December 2018. The old rolling stocks (DKZ9 Series) were replaced at the same time. Line 1's color is red.

=== Line 2 ===
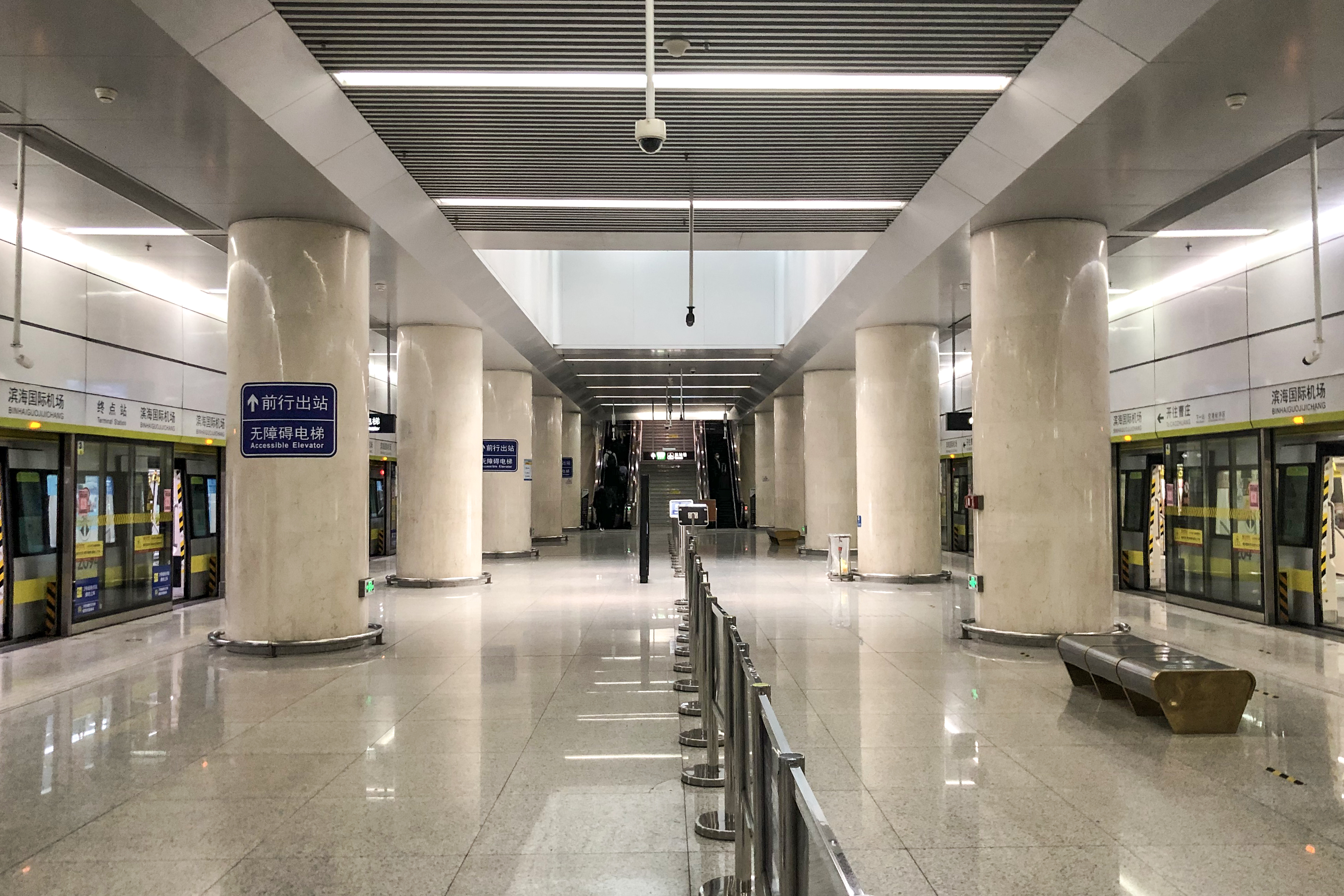
Binhaiguojijichang station of Line 2

Line 2 opened for trial operations on 1 July 2012. Due to a structural accident in Jianguodao Station, Line 2 was operated as two separate sections from July 2012 to 28 August 2013, when the affected station opened after being rebuilt. The line is 27.157 km (16.875 mi) long with 20 stations. Line 2's color is yellow.

=== Line 3 ===
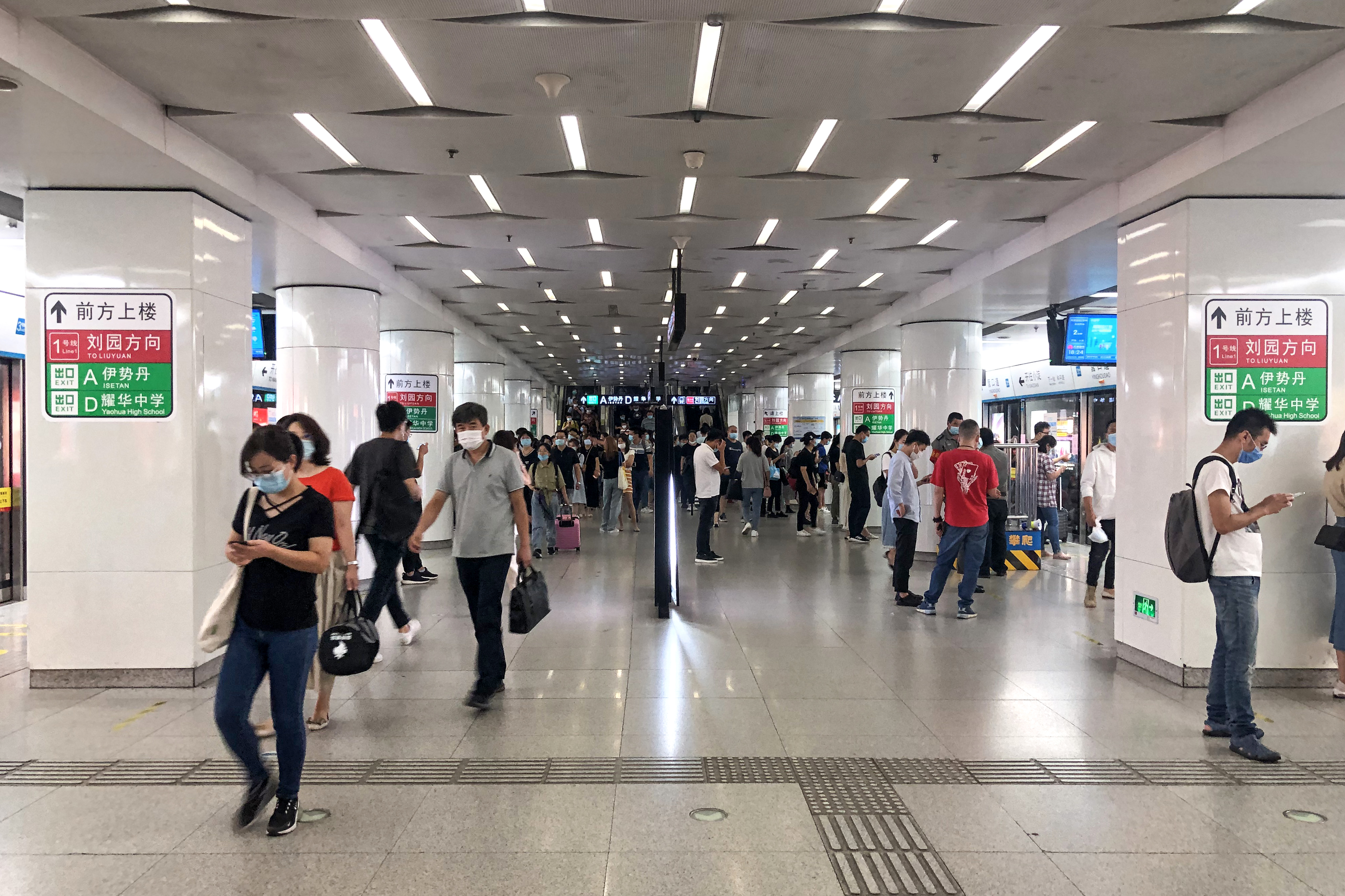
Yingkoudao station of Line 3

Line 3, running southeast–northwest, opened on 1 October 2012. It is 33.7 km (20.9 mi) long with 26 stations. 20 km (12 mi) of track is underground, with 1.2 km (0.75 mi) at ground level and the rest on elevated viaducts. Of the 21 stations, one is elevated, one is at ground level and the other 19 are underground. Line 3's color is light blue.

=== Line 4 ===
The southern section of Line 4 will be 19.4 km (12.1 mi) long. The southern section of Line 4 is opened in December 2021 from Dongnanjiao to Xinxingcun. Line 4's color is green.

=== Line 5 ===
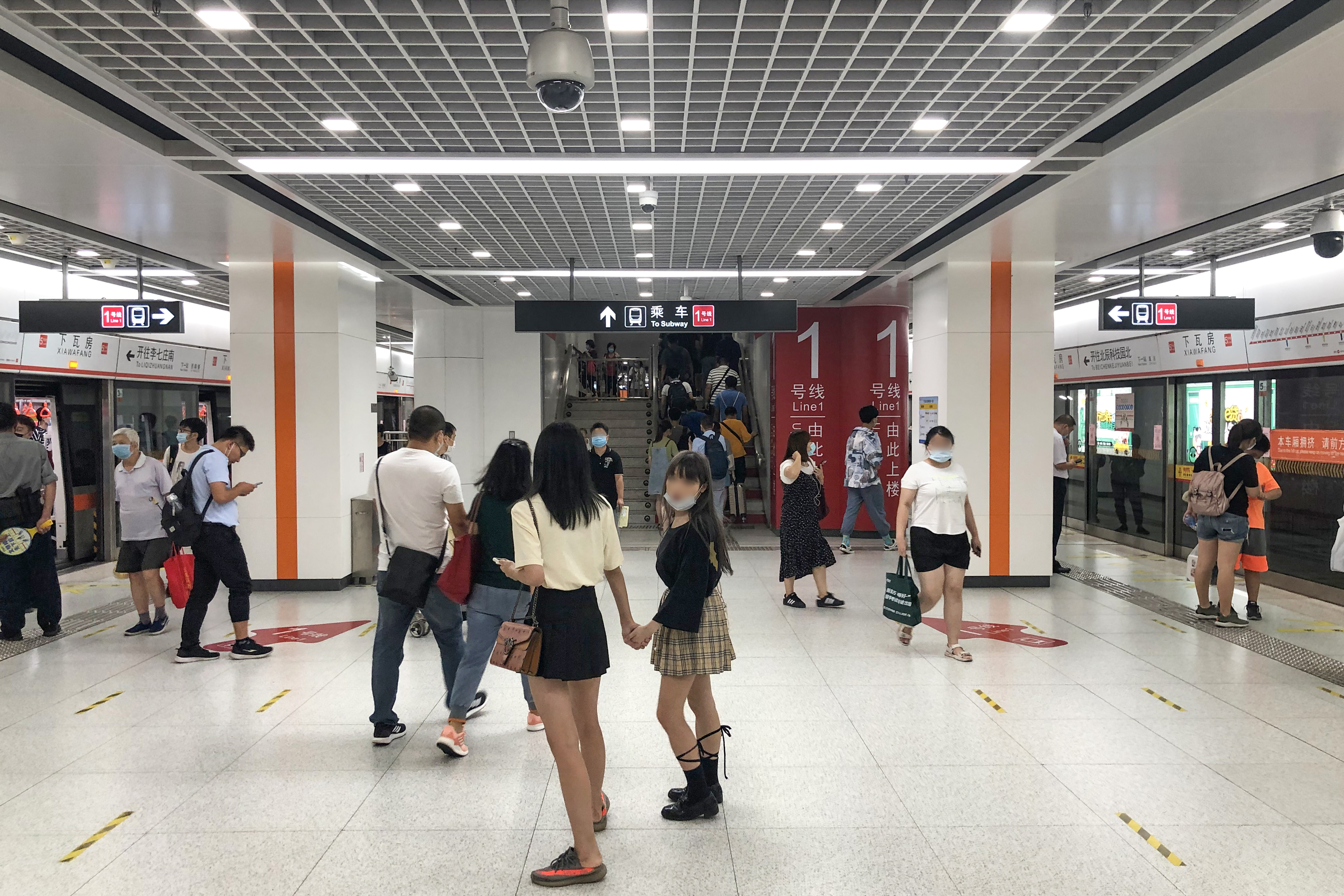
Xiawafang station of Line 5

Line 5 runs from Beichenkejiyuanbei to Liqizhuangnan with 28 stations. The line is 36.1 km (22.4 mi) long with 29 stations. On 22 October 2018, the section from Danhebeidao to Zhongyiyifuyuan (26 stations) became operational. On 31 January 2019, the line was extended one station to Beichenkejiyuanbei. On 7 December 2021, the line was extended one station to Liqizhuangnan, completing the 34.8 km (21.6 mi) long, 28.station first phase. On 28 September 2024, the line was again extended one station and 1.3 km to Jinghuadongdao. Line 5 and Line 6 form a loop. It is run by Tianjin Binhai Mass Transit Development Co., Ltd, which becomes a subsidiary of Tianjin Rail Transit Group Corporation since 2017. Line 5's color is orange.

=== Line 6 ===
Line 6 runs from Nansunzhuang to Lushuidao with a total length of 42.6 km (26.5 mi). The section from Changhonggongyuan to Nancuiping opened on 6 August 2016. The section from Nansunzhuang to Changhonggongyuan opened on 31 December 2016. The section from Nancuiping to Meilinlu opened on 26 April 2018, and the section from Meilinlu to Lushuidao opened on 28 December 2021. Line 6's color is magenta.

=== Line 7 ===
Line 7 started construction in 2019 and will run from Saidalu to Xifengdao. It is 20.06 km long with 15 stations and runs north south. The line will use six car Type A trains. The southern section from Gulou to Saidalu opened on 28 September 2025.

=== Line 8 ===
Line 8, running from Lushuidao to Xianshuiguxi, opened on 28 December 2021. This line is also the first metro line in Tianjin to use Type A, GoA4 automated trains. Line 8's color is violet.

=== Line 9 ===
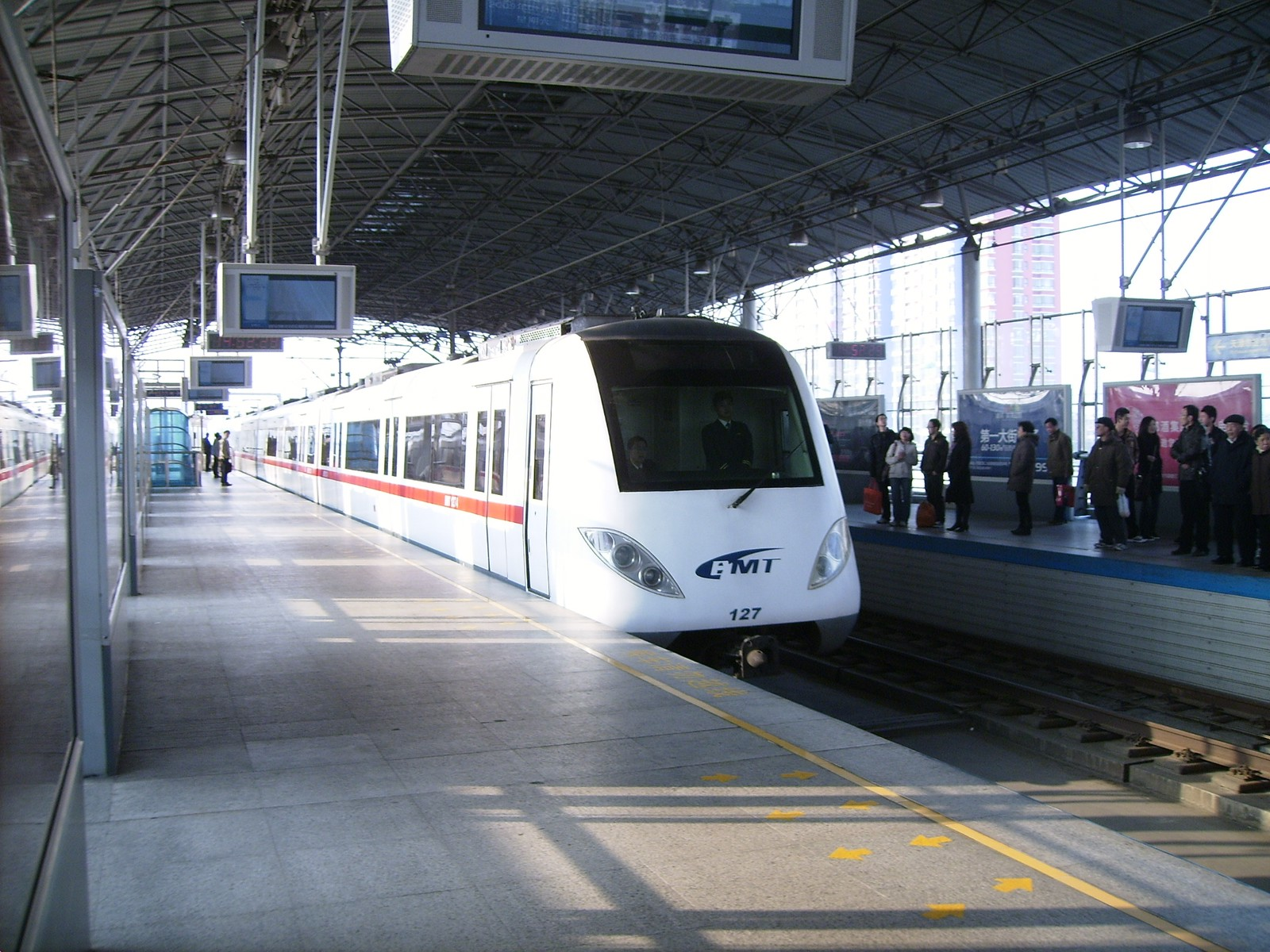
Tanggu station of Line 9

Line 9 is an east–west line running just north of the Haihe River. It runs from Tianjin railway station to Donghai Road station. It was opened in 2004, spanning 52.8 km (32.8 mi) with 21 stations. The line provides interchange to the TEDA Tram line. Line 9 was suspended after damage from the August 2015 explosions, and resumed operation on 16 December from Tianjin Railway Station to Tianjin Pipe Corporation Station. Now, the damaged part has been reopened, along with two new stations: Zhangguizhuang and Taihulu. The line is operated by Tianjin Binhai Mass Transit Development Co., Ltd, which is a subsidiary of Tianjin Rail Transit Group Corporation since 2017. Line 9's color is blue.

=== Line 10 ===
The Phase 1 of Line 10, from Yudongcheng to Yutai, is 21.18 km (13.16 mi) long with 21 stations. It opened in 2022. Line 10's color is chartreuse.

=== Line 11 ===
Line 11 runs from Shuishanggongyuanxilu to Dongliliujinglu. It is 23.8 km long with 21 stations. Eastern part of the phase 1 of line 11, from Dongjiangdao to Dongliliujinglu (11 stations, 13.68 km (8.50 mi)) was opened on 28 December 2023. The 10.12 km (6.29 mi) western part of phase 1 to Shuishanggongyuanxilu, with 10 more stations, opened on 28 December 2024.

=== Jinjing Line ===
The Jinjing Line is a 13.2 km (8.2 mi) long suburban rapid transit line from Jinghuadongdao station to Jinghai District. This line is opened on 28 September 2024. There are through service between Line 5 and Jinjing Line. In a second phase, an extension and a branch are planned.

=== Line Z4 ===
Line Z4 is a 43.7 km (27.2 mi) long rapid transit line in Binhai New Area, Tianjin. The 23.7 km (14.7 mi) elevated section opened on 18 January 2026, and the 20 km (12 mi) section (mainly underground) is planned to open in 2027.

== Former service ==
=== TEDA Modern Guided Rail Tram ===
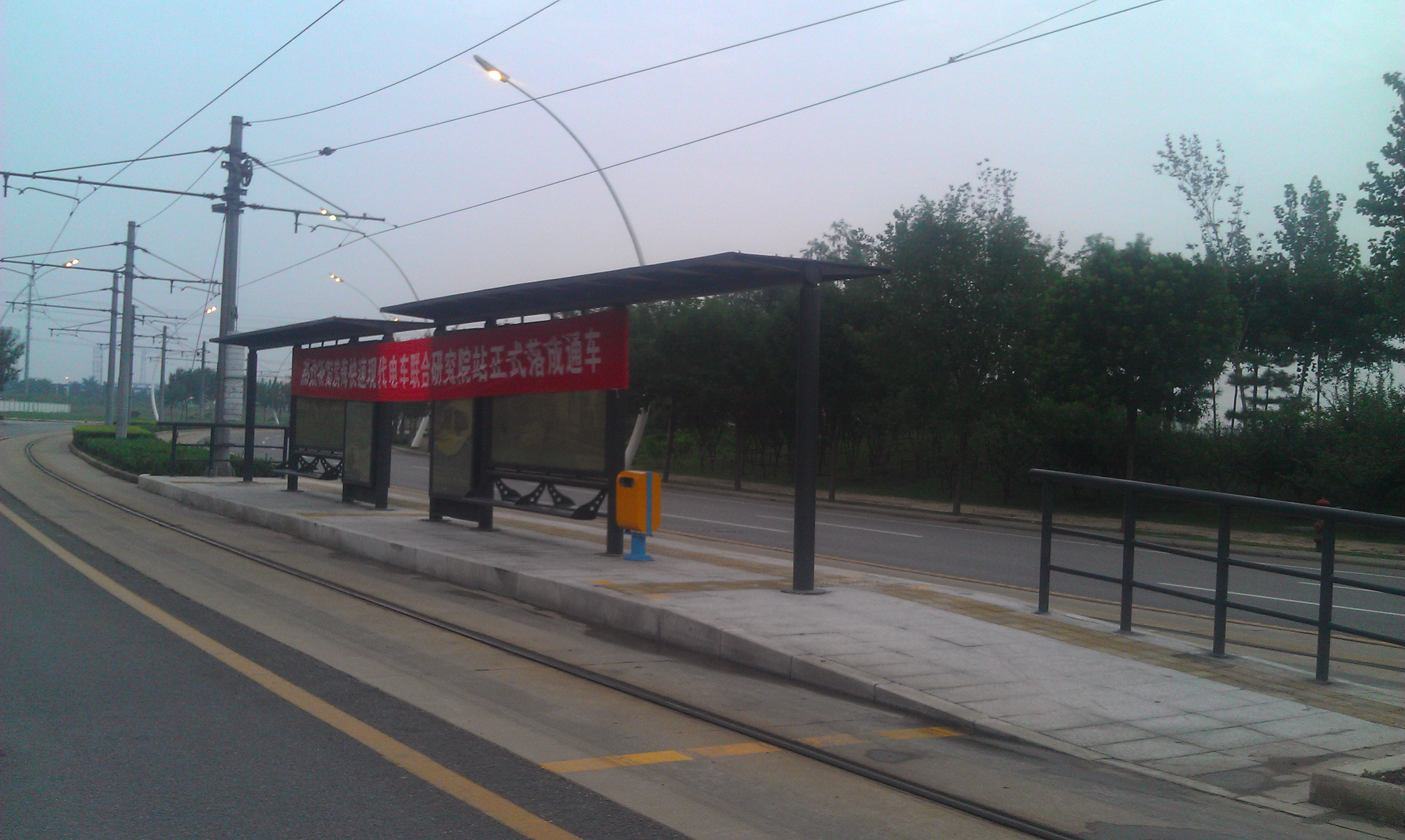
Joint Academy station of TEDA Line

The TEDA Tram was a tram line that ran between TEDA and North of College District stations, mainly serving the Tianjin Economic Development Area (TEDA). It opened on 10 May 2007 and was 7.86 km (4.88 mi) long. It was run by Tianjin Binhai Mass Transit Development Co., Ltd, which has been a subsidiary of Tianjin Rail Transit Group Corporation since 2017. TEDA Line's color was light green. Operations on the TEDA Tram were suspended on 1 June 2023.

=== Current fleet ===
Line	Train type	Image	Formation	Top speed		Number of trainsets	Manufacturer	Built
Line	Train type	Image	Formation	km/h	mph	Number of trainsets	Manufacturer	Built
Line 1	Type B		6 cars	80	50	~40	CSR Sifang / CRRC	2004–2006
Line 2	Type B		6 cars	80	50	~30	CRRC	2012–2014
Line 3	Type B		6 cars	80	50	~35	CRRC	2011–2013
Line 5	Type B		6 cars	80	50	~25	CRRC	2017–2018
Line 6	Type B		6 cars	80	50	~30	CRRC	2016–2019
Line 9 (Binhai)	Type B		4 cars	100	62	~20	CRRC	2004–2007
Line 10	Type B		6 cars	80	50	~20	CRRC	2021–2022
Line 11	Type A		6 cars	100	62	~20	CRRC	2022–2023

=== Former rolling stock ===
Line	Train type	Image	Formation	Top speed (km/h)	Top speed (mph)	Number of trainsets	Manufacturer	Built	Withdrawal
Line 1	DKZ9		6 cars	80	50	25 sets	CNR Changchun / Tangshan	2005–2006	2016–2018

== Fares ==
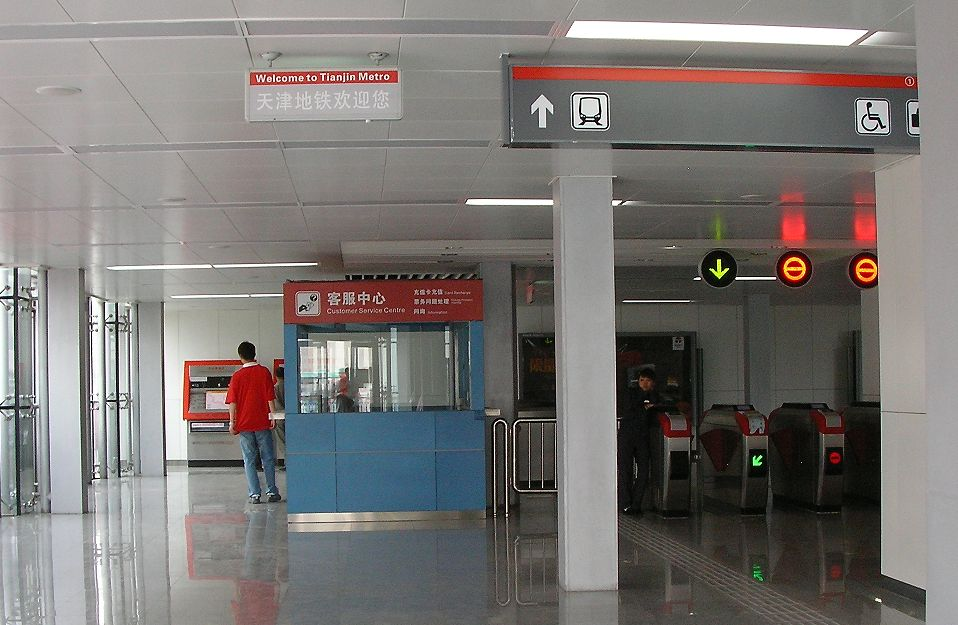
Entrance to Xinanjiao station

Tianjin Metro uses magnetic smartcards. The fare is distance-based and ranges between 2 and 5 yuan.

Journeys can be paid for using QR codes.

=== One-way ticket ===
One-way tickets are available at automatic ticket machines, where passengers can purchase up to 9 tickets. The tickets are only effective in three hours from purchase. A ticket can be purchased from the automatic ticket machine, and recycled by simply inserting it into the turnstile when leaving the station.

=== Common stored value ticket ===
Stored-value tickets can be repeatedly used for the regular subway passengers, the fare for each journey outbound passengers through the gates when the balance deducted from the stored-value tickets. Within one year of non-use of stored-value tickets as expired, outdated stored-value tickets available at the station free update procedures for handling customer service center. Common stored value ticket holders enjoy 10% off travel.

=== Student discount tickets and tickets for the elderly ===
All full-time students attending schools, technical secondary, craftsmen, and vocational schools with student ID issued by letter may purchase student tickets and enjoy a student discount.

Seniors between 60 and 69 years old with a "Tianjin old preference card" (green) can buy discounted senior tickets, seniors 70 years old and older, with a "Tianjin old preference card" (purple) may purchase specially discounted tickets.

=== City Card ===
The City Card is a non-contact type IC card transit card similar to the Yikatong card in Beijing. It is accepted in subway, light rail, bus, ferry and taxi transport. Since 28 December 2006, City Card has been accepted on the metro line 1. City Card holders can enjoy a discounted fare during transfers between modes. This is the most popular method for long-distance traveling. Ferryboat and bus fares are not distance based.

=== Unlimited ride ===
Period	Fare
1 day	18
3 days	40

== Future expansion ==
The "Tianjin Metro Phase 2 construction plan", which is approved by the NDRC, consists of 513 km of lines total.

Map of Tianjin Metro, including lines under construction. Updated in February 2021.

=== Lines under construction ===
Line	Section	Terminals		Planned Opening Date	Length km	Stations	References
Line 8	Phase 1 (Urban section)	Lüshuigongyuan	Lushuidao	2026	18.54	17	
Line 8	Phase 2	Zhongbeizhen	Lüshuigongyuan	2026	4.8	4	
Line 11	Phase 2	Wenjielu	Shuishanggongyuanxilu	2026	3.84	3	
Line B1	Phase 1	Xinjiayuandong	Tanggu	2027	31.28	21	
Line Z2	Phase 1	Binhaiguojijichang	Beitang	2027	39.3	14	
Line Z4	Phase 1	Beitang	Xinchengliu	2027 (Beitang to Binhaizhan)	20	14	

==== Line B1 ====
A 22.5 km (14.0 mi) long metro line strictly serving the urban core of Binhai connecting Binhai West railway station to the Yujiapu Financial District and Binhai railway station.

==== Line Z2 ====
A 39.3 km (24.4 mi) long metro line from Tianjin Binhai International Airport to Beitang station. A western extension to Jinzhonghedajie station on Lines 5 and 6 is under planning.

== See also ==
- Transport in Tianjin
- List of rapid transit systems
- Urban rail transit in China
