= Tianjinzhan station =

Metro station in Tianjin, China

Tianjinzhan 天津站
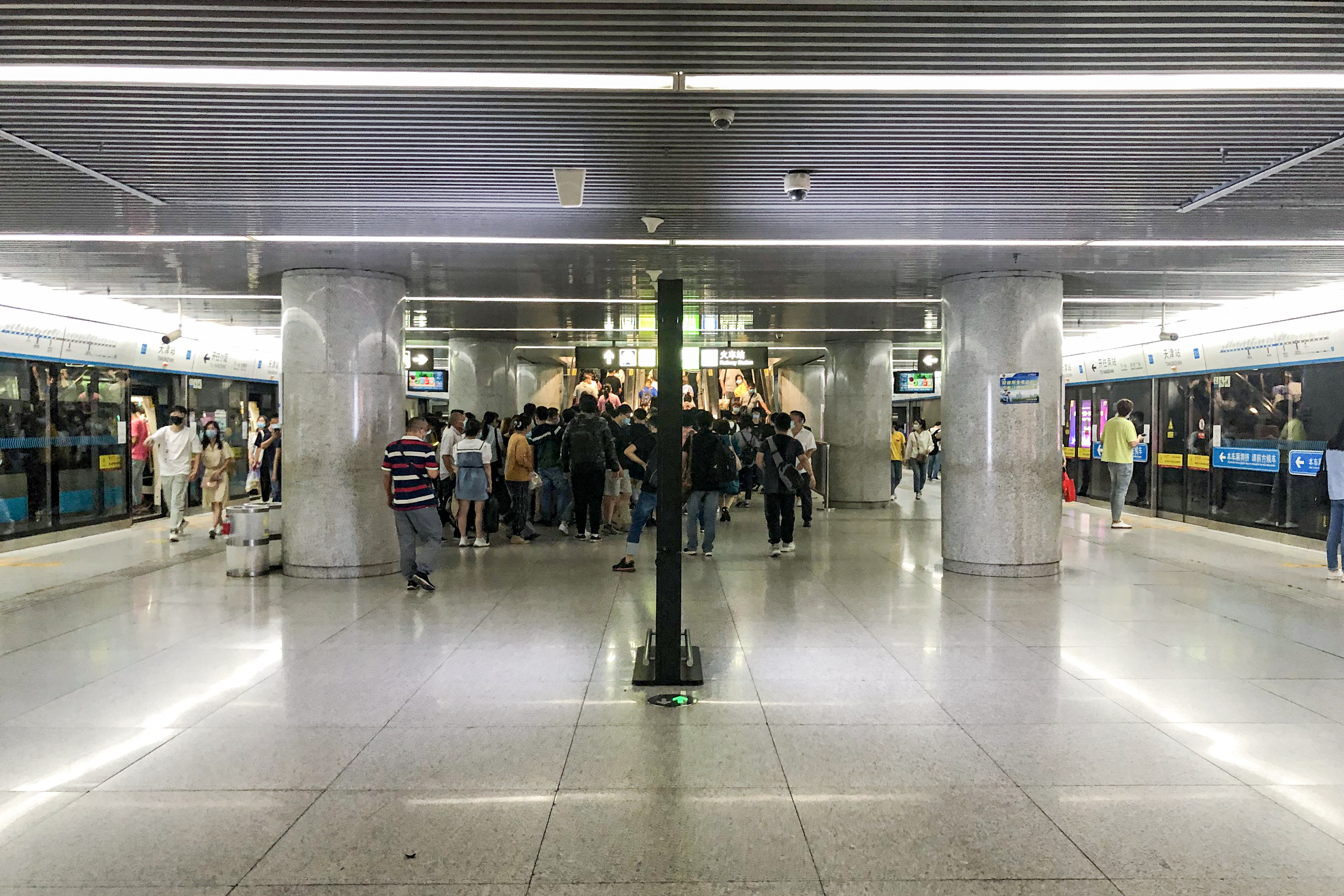
- Line 3 platform

General information
- Other names: Tianjin Railway Station
- Location: Hedong District, Tianjin; China
- Coordinates: 39.1362°N 117.2044°E
- Operated by: Tianjin Metro Co. Ltd.
- Lines: Line 2; Line 3; Line 9
- Connections: Tianjin railway station

Construction
- Structure type: Underground

History
- Opened: 1 July 2012 (Line 2); 1 October 2012 (Line 3); 15 October 2012 (Line 9)

Services
Preceding station	Tianjin Metro	Following station
Jianguodaoyifengqu towards Caozhuang	Line 2	Yuanyangguojizhongxin towards Binhaiguojijichang
Jinwan'guangchang towards Nanzhan	Line 3	Jinshiqiao towards Xiaodian
Terminus	Line 9	Dawangzhuang towards Donghailu
Location

Tianjinzhan Station (Chinese: 天津站站; lit. 'Tianjin Railway Station') is a station of lines 2, 3 and 9 of the Tianjin Metro. It began operations on 1 July 2012.
