= Donghai Road station =

Metro station in Tianjin, China

Donghai Road 东海路
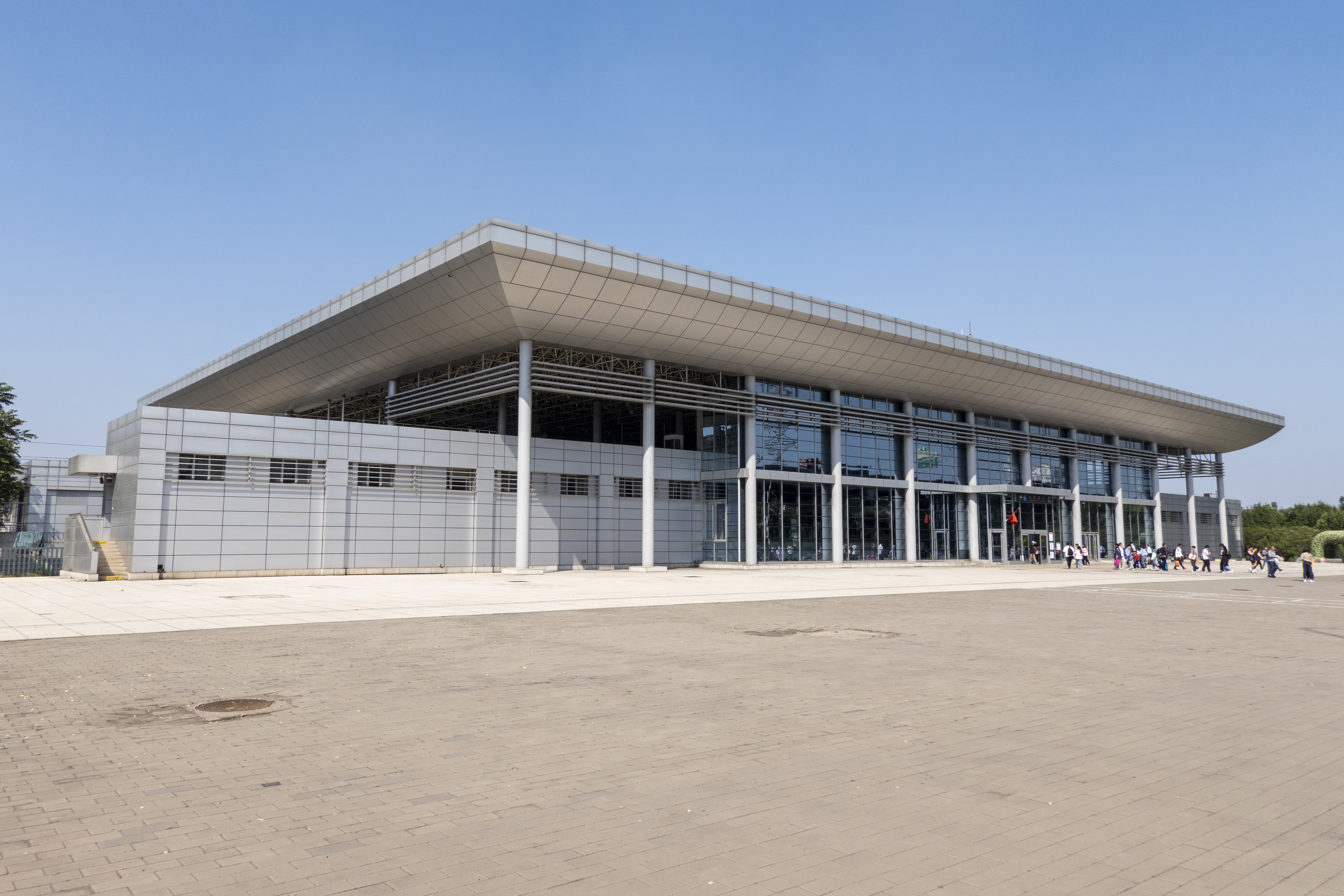
- exterior of Donghai Road station after re-construction (2023)

General information
- Location: Binhai District, Tianjin; China
- Coordinates: 39°2′23″N 117°43′51″E
- Operated by: Binhai Mass Transit Co. Ltd.
- Line(s): Line 9

Construction
- Structure type: Elevated

History
- Opened: 28 March 2004; 31 December 2016 (re-opening)
- Closed: 13 August 2015

Services
Preceding station	Tianjin Metro	Following station
Huizhanzhongxin towards Tianjinzhan	Line 9	Terminus

Donghai Road Station (Chinese: 东海路站), also known as Donghailu Station, is a station of Line 9 of the Tianjin Metro. It started operations on 28 March 2004.

The station was severely damaged on 12 August 2015 when a series of explosions occurred at the nearby Port of Tianjin. The roof of the station collapsed. As a result of the damage as well as the ongoing situation at the blast site, the station was closed for repairs from 13 August 2015 and reopened on 31 December 2016.

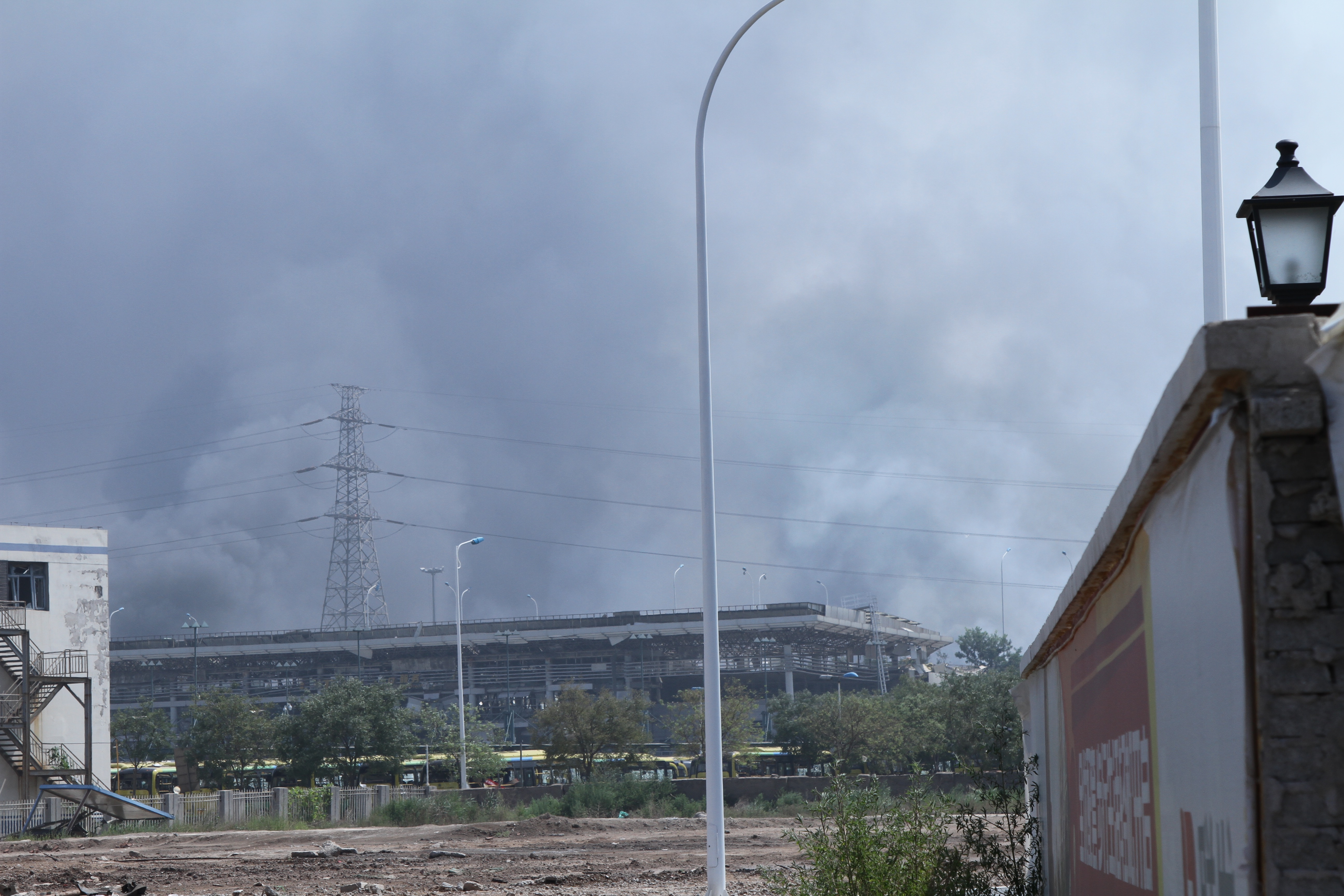
Station structure after the explosion (mid-bottom)
