= List of Tianjin Metro stations =

Map of Tianjin Metro

This is a list of Tianjin Metro stations organized by line.

== Line 1 ==
Station name		Transfer	Location
English	Chinese characters	Transfer	Location
Shuangqiaohe	双桥河		Jinnan
Xianshuigubei (Xianshuigu North)	咸水沽北		Jinnan
Donggulu (Donggu Road)	东沽路		Jinnan
Guoruilu (Guorui Road)	国瑞路		Jinnan
Guojiahuizhanzhongxin (National Exhibition & Convention Center)	国家会展中心		Jinnan
Shangguozhuang	上郭庄		Jinnan
Gaozhuangzi	高庄子		Jinnan
Hongnihedong (Hongnihe East)	洪泥河东		Jinnan
Lishuanglubei (Lishuang Road North)	梨双路北		Jinnan
Lilou	李楼		Jinnan
Shuanglin	双林		Jinnan
Caijingdaxue (Tianjin University of Finance & Economics)	财经大学	Tianjin Metro Line 10	Hexi
Huashanli	华山里	(OSI via Dongjiangdao)	Hexi
Fuxingmen	复兴门		Hexi
Chentangzhuang	陈塘庄		Hexi
Tucheng	土城		Hexi
Nanlou	南楼		Hexi
Xiawafang	下瓦房	Tianjin Metro Line 5	Hexi
Xiaobailou	小白楼	(OSI via Xuzhoudao)	Heping
Yingkoudao (Yingkou Road)	营口道	Tianjin Metro Line 3	Heping
Anshandao (Anshan Road)	鞍山道		Heping
Haiguangsi (Haiguang Temple)	海光寺		Nankai
Erweilu (Erwei Road)	二纬路		Nankai
Xi'nanjiao	西南角	Tianjin Metro Line 2	Nankai
Xibeijiao	西北角		Hongqiao
Xizhan (Tianjin West Railway Station)	西站	Tianjin Metro Line 6	Hongqiao
Honghuli	洪湖里		Hongqiao
Qinjiandao (Qinjian Road)	勤俭道		Hongqiao
Benxilu (Benxi Road)	本溪路		Hongqiao
Jiayuanli	佳园里		Beichen
Ruijingxinyuan	瑞景新苑		Beichen
Liuyuan	刘园		Beichen

== Line 2 ==
Station name		Transfer	Location
English	Chinese characters	Transfer	Location
Caozhuang	曹庄		Xiqing
Bianxing	卞兴		Nankai
Jieyuanxidao (Jieyuan West Road)	芥园西道		Nankai
Xianyanglu (Xianyang Road)	咸阳路		Nankai
Changhonggongyuan (Changhong Park)	长虹公园	Tianjin Metro Line 6	Nankai
Guangkaisimalu (Guangkai 4th Road)	广开四马路		Nankai
Xi'nanjiao	西南角	Tianjin Metro Line 1	Nankai
Gulou	鼓楼		Nankai
Dongnanjiao	东南角	Tianjin Metro Line 4	Nankai
Jianguodaoyifengqu (Jianguo Road·Italian Style Area)	建国道意风区		Hebei
Tianjinzhan (Tianjin Railway Station)	天津站	TJP	Hedong
Yuanyangguojizhongxin (Sino-Ocean International Center)	远洋国际中心		Hedong
Shunchiqiao (Shunchi Overpass)	顺驰桥		Hedong
Jingjianglu (Jingjiang Road)	靖江路	Tianjin Metro Line 5	Hedong
Cuifuxincun	翠阜新村		Hedong
Yudongcheng	屿东城	Tianjin Metro Line 10	Dongli
Dengzhoulu (Dengzhou Road)	登州路		Dongli
Guoshanlu (Guoshan Road)	国山路		Dongli
Konggangjingjiqu (Airport Economic Area)	空港经济区		Dongli
Binhaiguojijichang (Binhai International Airport)	滨海国际机场		Dongli

== Line 3 ==
Station name		Transfer	Location
English	Chinese characters	Transfer	Location
Nanzhan (Tianjin South railway station)	南站	TIP	Xiqing
Yangwuzhuang	杨伍庄		Xiqing
Xuefugongyequ (Xuefu Industrial Zone)	学府工业区		Xiqing
Gaoxinqu (Hi-tech Industrial Development Area)	高新区		Xiqing
Daxuecheng (University Town)	大学城		Xiqing
Huayuan	华苑		Nankai
Wangdingdi	王顶堤		Nankai
Hongqinanlu (South Hongqi Road)	红旗南路	Tianjin Metro Line 6	Nankai
Zhoudengji'nianguan (Zhou Enlai & Deng Yingchao Memorial Hall)	周邓纪念馆		Nankai
Tianta (Tianjin Radio & Television Tower)	天塔		Nankai
Wujiayao	吴家窑	Tianjin Metro Line 11	Hexi/Heping
Xikanglu (Xikang Road)	西康路		Heping
Yingkoudao (Yingkou Road)	营口道	Tianjin Metro Line 1	Heping
Hepinglu (Heping Road)	和平路	(OSI)	Heping
Jinwan'guangchang (Jinwan Square)	津湾广场		Heping
Tianjinzhan (Tianjin Railway Station)	天津站	TJP	Hedong
Jinshiqiao (Jinshi Overpass)	金狮桥		Hebei
Zhongshanlu (Zhongshan Road)	中山路		Hebei
Beizhan (Tianjin North Railway Station)	北站	TBP	Hebei
Tiedonglu (Tiedong Road)	铁东路		Hebei
Zhangxingzhuang	张兴庄	Tianjin Metro Line 5	Hebei
Yixingfu	宜兴埠		Beichen
Tianshili (Tasly)	天士力		Beichen
Huabeijituan (Huabei Group)	华北集团		Beichen
Fengchanhe (Fengchan River)	丰产河		Beichen
Xiaodian	小淀		Beichen

== Line 4 ==
Station name		Connections	Distance km	Location
English	Chinese	Connections	Distance km	Location
Dongnanjiao	东南角	Tianjin Metro Line 2		Nankai
Jinjie (Golden Street)	金街			Heping
Hepinglu (Heping Road)	和平路	(OSI)		Heping
Xuzhoudao (Xuzhou Road)	徐州道	(OSI via Xiaobailou)		Heping
Liuweilu (Liuwei Road)	六纬路			Hedong
Chenglindao (Chenglin Road)	成林道	Tianjin Metro Line 5		Hedong
Taichanglu (Taichang Road)	泰昌路			Hedong
Wandonglu (Wandong Road)	万东路			Hedong
Shaliunanlu (Shaliu South Road)	沙柳南路			Dongli
Dengzhounanlu (Dengzhou South Road)	登州南路			Dongli
Yuejinbeilu (Yuejin North Road)	跃进北路			Dongli
Hangshuanglu (Hangshuang Road)	航双路			Dongli
Minhangdaxue (Civil Aviation University of China)	民航大学			Dongli
Xinxingcun	新兴村			Dongli

== Line 5 ==
Station name		Connections	Distance km	Location
English	Chinese	Connections	Distance km	Location
Beichenkejiyuanbei (Beichen Technology Park North)	北辰科技园北			Beichen
Danhebeidao (Danhe North Road)	丹河北道			Beichen
Beichendao (Beichen Road)	北辰道			Beichen
Zhiyedaxue (Tianjin Vocational Institute)	职业大学			Beichen
Huaihedao (Huaihe Road)	淮河道			Beichen
Liaohebeidao (Liaohe North Road)	辽河北道			Beichen
Yixingfubei (Yixingfu North)	宜兴埠北			Beichen
Zhangxingzhuang	张兴庄	Tianjin Metro Line 3		Beichen
Zhichenglu (Zhicheng Road)	志成路			Beichen
Siyuanlu (Siyuan Road)	思源路			Hebei
Jianchangdao (Jianchang Road)	建昌道			Hebei
Jinzhonghedajie (Jinzhonghe Street)	金钟河大街	Tianjin Metro Line 6		Dongli/Hebei
Yueyahe	月牙河			Hebei
Xingfugongyuan (Xingfu Park)	幸福公园			Hebei
Jingjianglu (Jingjiang Road)	靖江路	Tianjin Metro Line 2		Hedong
Chenglindao (Chenglin Road)	成林道	Tianjin Metro Line 4		Hedong
Jintanglu (Jintang Road)	津塘路			Hedong
Zhigu	直沽	Tianjin Metro Line 9		Hedong
Xiawafang	下瓦房	Tianjin Metro Line 1		Hexi
Xi'nanlou	西南楼			Hexi
Wenhuazhongxin (Cultural Centre)	文化中心	Tianjin Metro Line 6 Tianjin Metro Line 11		Hexi
Tianjinbinguan (Tianjin Hotel)	天津宾馆	Tianjin Metro Line 6		Hexi
Zhongliuyiyuan (Cancer Hospital)	肿瘤医院	Tianjin Metro Line 6 Tianjin Metro Line 7		Hexi
Tiyuzhongxin (Sports Centre)	体育中心			Nankai
Lingbinlu (Lingbin Road)	凌宾路			Xiqing
Changlinglu (Changling Road)	昌凌路	Tianjin Metro Line 10		Xiqing
Zhongyiyifuyuan} (1st Affiliated Hospital of Tianjin University of Traditional Chinese Medicine)	中医一附院			Xiqing
Liqizhuangnan (Liqizhuang South)	李七庄南			Xiqing
Jinghuadongdao (Jinghua East Road)	京华东道	Jinjing line		Xiqing
Through train to Tuanboyixueyuan.

== Line 6 ==
Station name		Connections	Distance km		Location
English	Chinese	Connections	Distance km		Location
Nansunzhuang	南孙庄		0.00	0.00	Dongli
Nanhezhuang	南何庄		2.43	2.43	Dongli
Dabizhuang	大毕庄		1.09	3.52	Dongli
Jinzhongjie	金钟街		1.20	4.72	Dongli
Xuzhuangzi	徐庄子		1.45	6.17	Dongli
Jinzhonghedajie (Jinzhonghe Street)	金钟河大街	Tianjin Metro Line 5	2.45	8.62	Dongli/Hebei
Minquanmen	民权门		0.92	9.54	Hebei
Beininggongyuan (Beining Park)	北宁公园		0.94	10.48	Hebei
Beizhan (Tianjin North Railway Station)	北站	TBP	1.33	11.81	Hebei
Xinkaihe	新开河		0.50	12.31	Hebei
Waiyuanfuzhong (Tianjin Foreign Languages School)	外院附中		1.13	13.44	Hebei
Tiantailu (Tiantai Road)	天泰路		0.77	14.21	Hebei
Beiyunhe (The Northern Canal)	北运河		0.75	14.96	Hebei
Beizhulin	北竹林		0.71	15.67	Hongqiao
Xizhan (Tianjin West Railway Station)	西站	TXP	0.84	16.51	Hongqiao
Fuxinglu (Fuxing Road)	复兴路		0.62	17.13	Hongqiao
Reminyiyuan (Tianjin People's Hospital)	人民医院		1.54	18.67	Hongqiao
Changhonggongyuan (Changhong Park)	长虹公园	Tianjin Metro Line 2	0.92	19.59	Nankai
Yibindao (Yibin Road)	宜宾道		1.20	20.79	Nankai
Anshanxidao (Anshan West Road)	鞍山西道		1.13	21.92	Nankai
Tiantuo	天拖		0.83	22.75	Nankai
Yizhongxinyiyuan (Tianjin 1st Central Hospital)	一中心医院		0.65	23.40	Nankai
Hongqinanlu (Hongqi South Road)	红旗南路	Tianjin Metro Line 3	1.20	24.60	Nankai
Yingfengdao (Yingfeng Road)	迎风道		0.69	25.29	Nankai
Nancuiping	南翠屏		1.47	26.76	Nankai
Shuishanggongyuandonglu (Water Park East Road)	水上公园东路		1.24	28.00	Nankai
Zhongliuyiyuan (Cancer Hospital)	肿瘤医院	Tianjin Metro Line 5 Tianjin Metro Line 7	0.98	28.98	Hexi
Tianjinbinguan (Tianjin Hotel)	天津宾馆	Tianjin Metro Line 5	1.37	30.35	Hexi
Wenhuazhongxin (Cultural Centre)	文化中心	Tianjin Metro Line 5 Tianjin Metro Line 11	0.94	31.29	Hexi
Leyuandao (Leyuan Road)	乐园道		0.93	32.22	Hexi
Jianshanlu (Jianshan Road)	尖山路		0.87	33.09	Hexi
Yidaeryuan (Tianjin Medical University 2nd Hospital)	医大二院	Tianjin Metro Line 11	0.64	33.73	Hexi
Meijiangdao (Meijiang Road)	梅江道		1.35	35.08	Hexi
Zuojiangdao (Zuojiang Road)	左江道	(OSI via Youyinanlu)	1.44	36.52	Hexi
Meijianggongyuan (Meijiang Park)	梅江公园		0.77	37.29	Hexi
Meijianghuizhanzhongxin (Meijiang Convention and Exhibition Center)	梅江会展中心		0.81	38.10	Hexi
Jiefangnanlu (Jiefang South Road)	解放南路		2.07	40.17	Hexi
Dongtinglu (Dongting Road)	洞庭路		1.03	41.20	Hexi
Meilinlu (Meilin Road)	梅林路		1.36	42.56	Hexi
Lushuidao (Lushui Road)	渌水道	Tianjin Metro Line 8			Hexi

== Line 7 ==
Station name		Transfer	Distance km	Location
English	Chinese	Transfer	Distance km	Location
Saidalu	赛达路			Xiqing
Lubeilu	芦北路			Xiqing
Hongyuandao	宏源道			Xiqing
Xinghuadao	兴华道			Xiqing
Zhangdaokou	张道口			Xiqing
Meijianghuizhanzhongxinnan	梅江会展中心南			Xiqing
Wanglanzhuang	王兰庄			Xiqing
Lijiangdao	丽江道	Tianjin Metro Line 10		Xiqing
Zhongliuyiyuan	肿瘤医院	Tianjin Metro Line 5 Tianjin Metro Line 6		Hexi
Tianta	天塔	Tianjin Metro Line 3		Nankai
Nankaidaxuebalitai	南开大学八里台	Tianjin Metro Line 11		Nankai
Tianjindaxueliulitai	天津大学六里台			Heping
Haiguangsi	海光寺	Tianjin Metro Line 1		Nankai
Fuandajie	福安大街			Heping
Gulou	鼓楼	Tianjin Metro Line 2		Nankai

== Line 8 ==
Station name		Connections	Distance km	Location
English	Chinese	Connections	Distance km	Location
Lushuidao (Lushui Road)	渌水道	Tianjin Metro Line 6		Jinnan
Shuanggang	双港			Jinnan
Jinghedao (Jinghe Road)	景荷道			Jinnan
Jinglidao (Jingli Road)	景荔道			Jinnan
Tianjindaxuebeiyangyuanxiaoqu (Tianjin University Peiyang Park Campus)	天津大学北洋园校区			Jinnan
Haihejiaoyuyuanqu (Haihe Education Park)	海河教育园区			Jinnan
Nankaidaxuejinnanxiaoqu (Nankai University Jinnan Campus)	南开大学津南校区			Jinnan
Hehuinanlu (Hehui South Road)	和慧南路			Jinnan
Xianshuiguxi (Xianshuigu West)	咸水沽西			Jinnan

== Line 9 ==
Station name		Connections	Distance km		Location
English	Chinese	Connections	Distance km		Location
Tianjinzhan (Tianjin Railway Station)	天津站	TJP	0.00	0.00	Hedong
Dawangzhuang	大王庄		1.40	1.40	Hedong
Shiyijinglu (Shiyijing Road)	十一经路		0.74	2.14	Hedong
Zhigu	直沽	Tianjin Metro Line 5	1.54	3.68	Hedong
Dongxinglu (Dongxing Road)	东兴路		1.08	4.76	Hedong
Zhongshanmen	中山门		2.02	6.78	Hedong
Yihaoqiao	一号桥	(OSI via Longhandao)	1.73	8.51	Hedong
Erhaoqiao	二号桥		0.90	9.41	Hedong
Zhangguizhuang	张贵庄		1.32	10.73	Dongli
Xinli	新立		2.51	13.24	Dongli
Donglikaifaqu (Dongli Development Area)	东丽开发区		1.98	15.22	Dongli
Xiaodongzhuang	小东庄		4.32	19.54	Dongli
Junliangcheng	军粮城		4.92	24.46	Dongli
Gangguangongsi (Pipe Corporation)	钢管公司		4.25	28.71	Dongli
Zhongxicun	中西村		3.13	31.84	Binhai
Hujiayuan	胡家园		6.16	38.00	Binhai
Tanggu	塘沽		4.81	42.81	Binhai
TEDA	泰达		1.64	44.45	Binhai
Shiminguangchang (Citizen Plaza)	市民广场		2.21	46.66	Binhai
Taihulu (Taihu Road)	太湖路		2.18	48.84	Binhai
Huizhanzhongxin (Convention and Exhibition Center)	会展中心		1.35	50.19	Binhai
Donghailu (Donghai Road)	东海路		1.31	51.50	Binhai

== Line 10 ==
Station name		Connections	Distance km	Location
English	Chinese	Connections	Distance km	Location
Yutai	于台			Xiqing
Yaohuanlu (Yaohuan Road)	瑶环路			Xiqing
Changlinglu (Changling Road)	昌凌路	Tianjin Metro Line 5		Xiqing
Lijiangdao (Lijiang Road)	丽江道			Xiqing
Jiangwanerzhilu (Jiangwan 2nd Branch Road)	江湾二支路			Xiqing
Youyinanlu (Youyi South Road)	友谊南路	(via Zuojiangdao)		Hexi
Nanzhuqiao (Nanzhu Bridge)	南珠桥			Hexi
Chunhailu (Chunhai Road)	春海路			Hexi
Magangchang	玛钢厂			Hexi
Weishanlu (Weishan Road)	微山路			Hexi
Caijingdaxue (Tianjin University of Finance & Economics)	财经大学	Tianjin Metro Line 1		Hexi
Liulinlu (Liulin Road)	柳林路			Hexi
Huanyudao (Huanyu Road)	环宇道	Tianjin Metro Line 11		Dongli
Longhandao (Longhan Road)	龙涵道	(via Yihaoqiao)		Hedong
Jinmaochanyeyuan (Jinmao Industrial Park)	金贸产业园			Hedong
Fangshandao (Fangshan Road)	方山道			Dongli
Shaliunanlu (Shaliu South Road)	沙柳南路	Tianjin Metro Line 4		Dongli
Wanshandao (Wanshan Road)	万山道			Dongli
Xiangshandao (Xiangshan Road)	香山道			Hedong
Laoshandao (Laoshan Road)	崂山道			Hedong
Yudongcheng	屿东城	Tianjin Metro Line 2		Hedong

== Line 11 ==
Station name		Connections	Distance km	Location
English	Chinese	Connections	Distance km	Location
Wenjielu	文洁路			Xiqing
Chengjianglu	澄江路			Nankai
Yizhongxinyiyuan	一中心医院	Tianjin Metro Line 6		Nankai
Shuishanggongyuanxilu	水上公园西路			Nankai
Nankaidaxuebalitai	南开大学八里台	Tianjin Metro Line 7		Nankai
Wujiayao	吴家窑	Tianjin Metro Line 3		Hexi
Tonglou	佟楼			Hexi
Yingbinguan	迎宾馆			Hexi
Wenhuazhongxin	文化中心	Tianjin Metro Line 5 Tianjin Metro Line 6		Hexi
Yidaeryuan	医大二院	Tianjin Metro Line 6		Hexi
Lishuidao	澧水道			Hexi
Neijianglu	内江路			Hexi
Chentang	陈塘			Hexi
Dongjiangdao (Dongjiang Road)	东江道	(OSI via Huashanli)		Hexi
Xueyuanbeilu (Xueyuan North Road)	学苑北路			Hexi
Haihedonglu (Haihe East Road)	海河东路			Dongli
Huanyudao (Huanyu Road)	环宇道	Tianjin Metro Line 10		Dongli
Xueliannanlu (Xuelian South Road)	雪莲南路			Hedong
Zhaoyuanlu (Zhaoyuan Road)	招远路			Dongli
Dongliwentizhongxin (Dongli Cultural and Sports Center)	东丽文体中心			Dongli
Xunhailu (Xunhai Road)	驯海路			Dongli
Dongliyijinglu (Dongli Yijing Road)	东丽一经路			Dongli
Donglisanjinglu (Dongli Sanjing Road)	东丽三经路			Dongli
Dongliliujinglu (Dongli Liujing Road)	东丽六经路			Dongli

== Jinjing Line ==
Station name		Connections	Distance km	Location
English	Chinese	Connections	Distance km	Location
Through train to Beichenkejiyuanbei.
Jinghuadongdao (Jinghua East Road)	京华东道	Tianjin Metro Line 5		Xiqing
Jingwu	精武			Xiqing
Tuanbojiankangcheng (Tuanbo Health City)	团泊健康城			Jinghai
Tuanboyixueyuan (Tuanbo Medical Park)	团泊医学园			Jinghai

== Line Z4 ==
Station name		Transfer	Distance km	Location
English	Chinese	Transfer	Distance km	Location
Zhaishang	寨上			Binhai New Area
Hanguyiyuan	汉沽医院			Binhai New Area
Zhongxinyugang	中心渔港			Binhai New Area
Yushadao	玉砂道			Binhai New Area
Hangmugongyuan	航母公园			Binhai New Area
Ruanjianyuan	软件园			Binhai New Area
Luchangyuan	绿创园			Binhai New Area
Heshunlu	和顺路			Binhai New Area
Zhongxinshengtaicheng	中新生态城			Binhai New Area
Beitang	北塘			Binhai New Area
