= Fuxingmen station =

Fuxingmen station can refer to:

- Fuxingmen station (Beijing Subway), a metro station in Beijing, China
- Fuxingmen station (Tianjin Metro), a metro station in Tianjin, China
