= Tucheng Station =

Tucheng Station can refer to:

- Tucheng metro station, a metro station in New Taipei, Taiwan
- Tucheng station (Tianjin Metro), a metro station in Tianjin, China

== See also ==
- Beitucheng station, a metro station in Beijing, China
- Xitucheng station, a metro station in Beijing, China
