= Tianjin Hutchison Whampoa Metro Plaza =

- Interactive map of the Tianjin Hutchison Whampoa Metro Plaza area

General information
- Status: Completed
- Type: Commercial
- Location: Tianjin, China
- Coordinates: 39.1164983°N 117.1922547°E
- Opening: 2013

Height
- Roof: 846 ft (258 m)

Technical details
- Floor count: 53

Design and construction
- Developer: Hutchison Whampoa

Tianjin Hutchison Whampoa Metro Plaza is a skyscraper in Tianjin, China. The 53-story building was completed in 2013, construction having begun in 2008. It is part of the Tianjin Century Metropolis complex, which directly connects to the Yingkoudao station via the complex's mall.

== See also ==
- Skyscraper design and construction
- List of tallest buildings in China
