= Shuanglin station =

Metro station in Tianjin, China

Shuanglin 双林
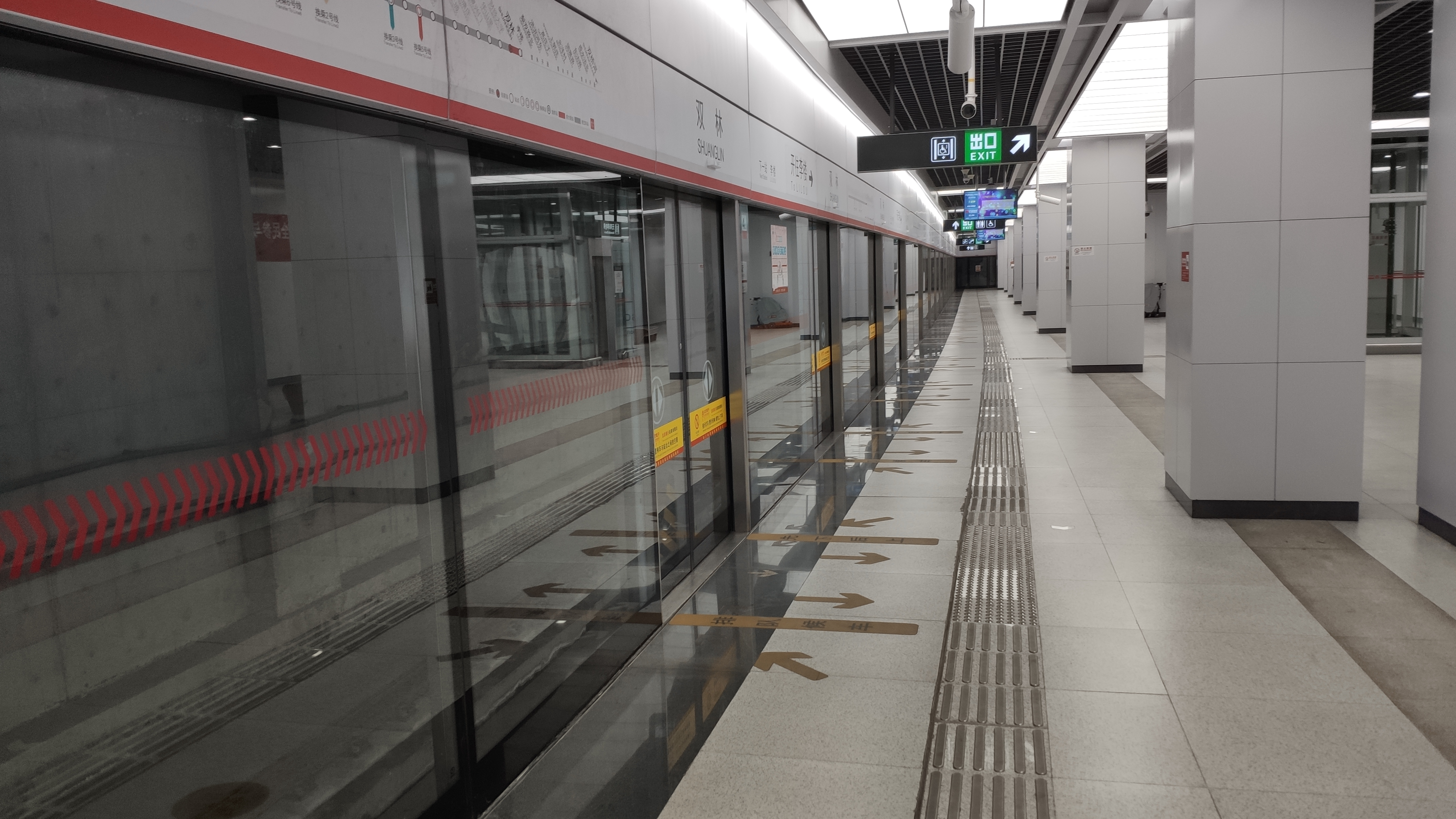

General information
- Location: Jinnan District, Tianjin; China
- Coordinates: 39°03′23″N 117°17′09″E
- Operator: Tianjin Metro
- Line: Line 1
- Platforms: 2

History
- Opened: 12 June 2006 (old at-grade station); 3 December 2018 (new underground station)
- Closed: 28 December 2016 (old at-grade station)

Services
Preceding station	Tianjin Metro	Following station
Lilou towards Shuangqiaohe	Line 1	Caijingdaxue towards Liuyuan
Location

Shuanglin Station (simplified Chinese: 双林站; traditional Chinese: 雙林站; pinyin: Shuānglín Zhàn) is an underground rapid transit station located in Jinnan District, Tianjin, China, near the Tianjin University of Technology and Education. It was the southern terminus station on Line 1 of the Tianjin Metro between 2006 and 2016.

The old at-grade station was closed on 28 December 2016 to make way for the southern extension of Line 1. A new underground station replaced it when the extension opened on December 3, 2018.

== Station Exits ==
Shuanglin station has two exits (nearby facilities and attractions are listed below):

- Exit A - Haitian Xin Yuan (海天馨苑) and Tianjin Metro Operating Company (天津地铁运营公司).
- Exit B - Tianjin University of Technology and Education

== Transport links ==
=== Buses ===
- No. 629, 652, 665, 676, 808, 855 etc.
