= Lilou station =

Metro station in Tianjin, China

Coordinates: 39°3′11.196″N 117°18′47.124″E

Lilou 李楼
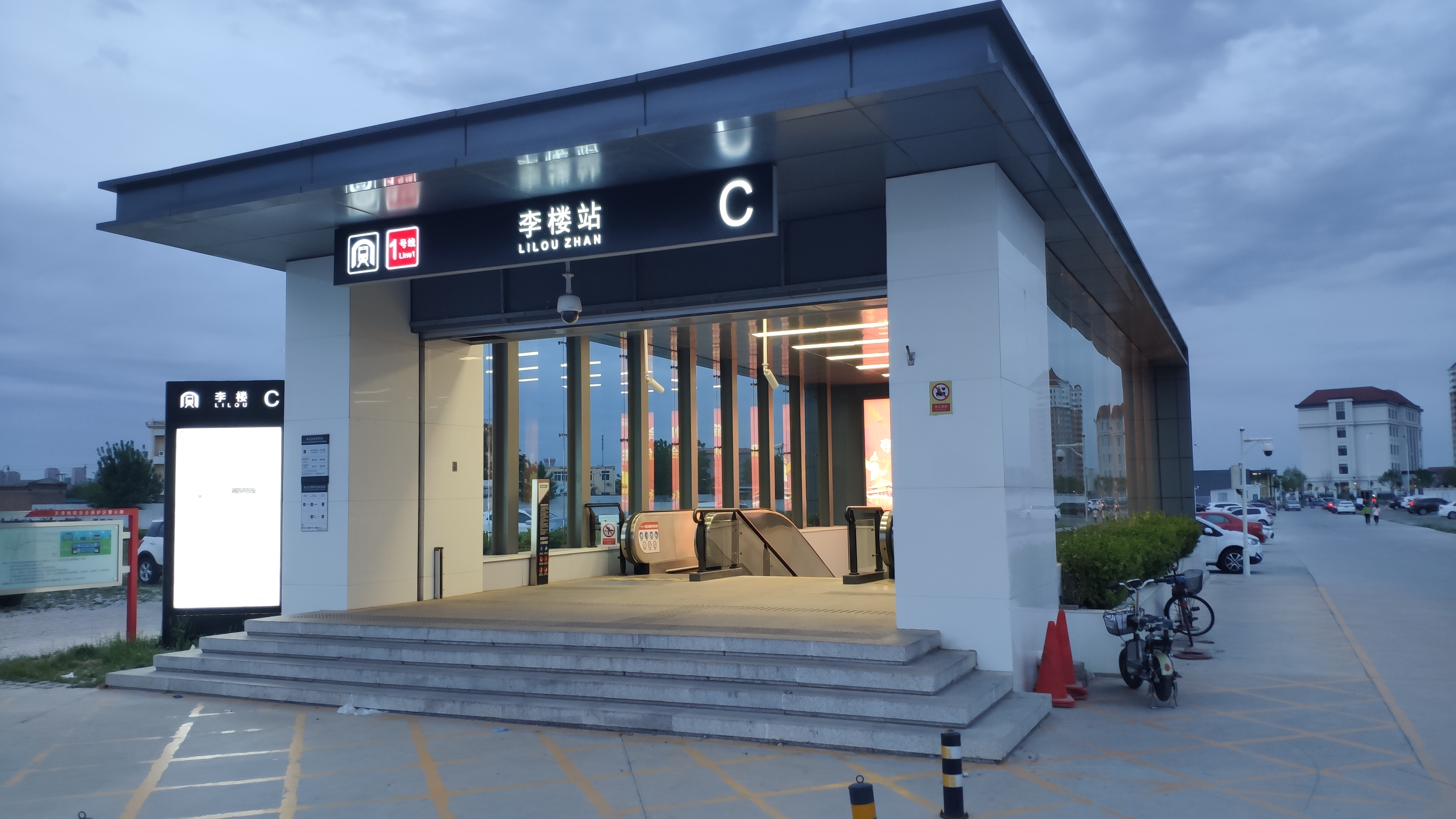
- Entrance C

General information
- Location: Jinnan District, Tianjin; China
- Operated by: Tianjin Metro Co. Ltd.
- Line: Line 1

Construction
- Structure type: Underground

History
- Opened: 3 December 2018

Services
Preceding station	Tianjin Metro	Following station
Gaozhuangzi towards Shuangqiaohe	Line 1	Shuanglin towards Liuyuan
Location

Lilou Station (simplified Chinese: 李楼站; traditional Chinese: 李樓站; pinyin: Lǐlóu Zhàn) is an underground station on Line 1 of Tianjin Metro. The station is located in Jinnan District, Tianjin, China.

== Gallery ==
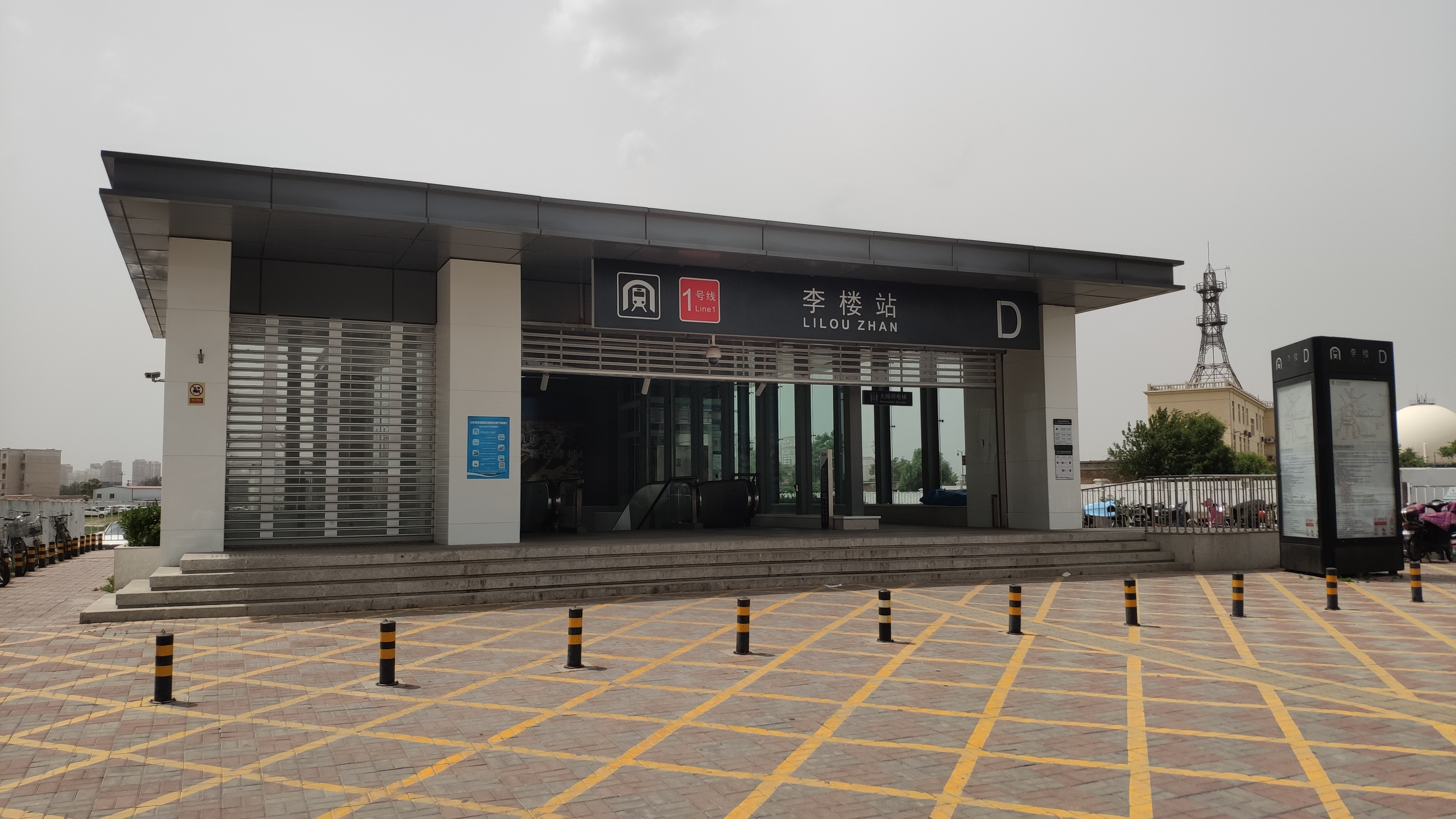
Entrance D

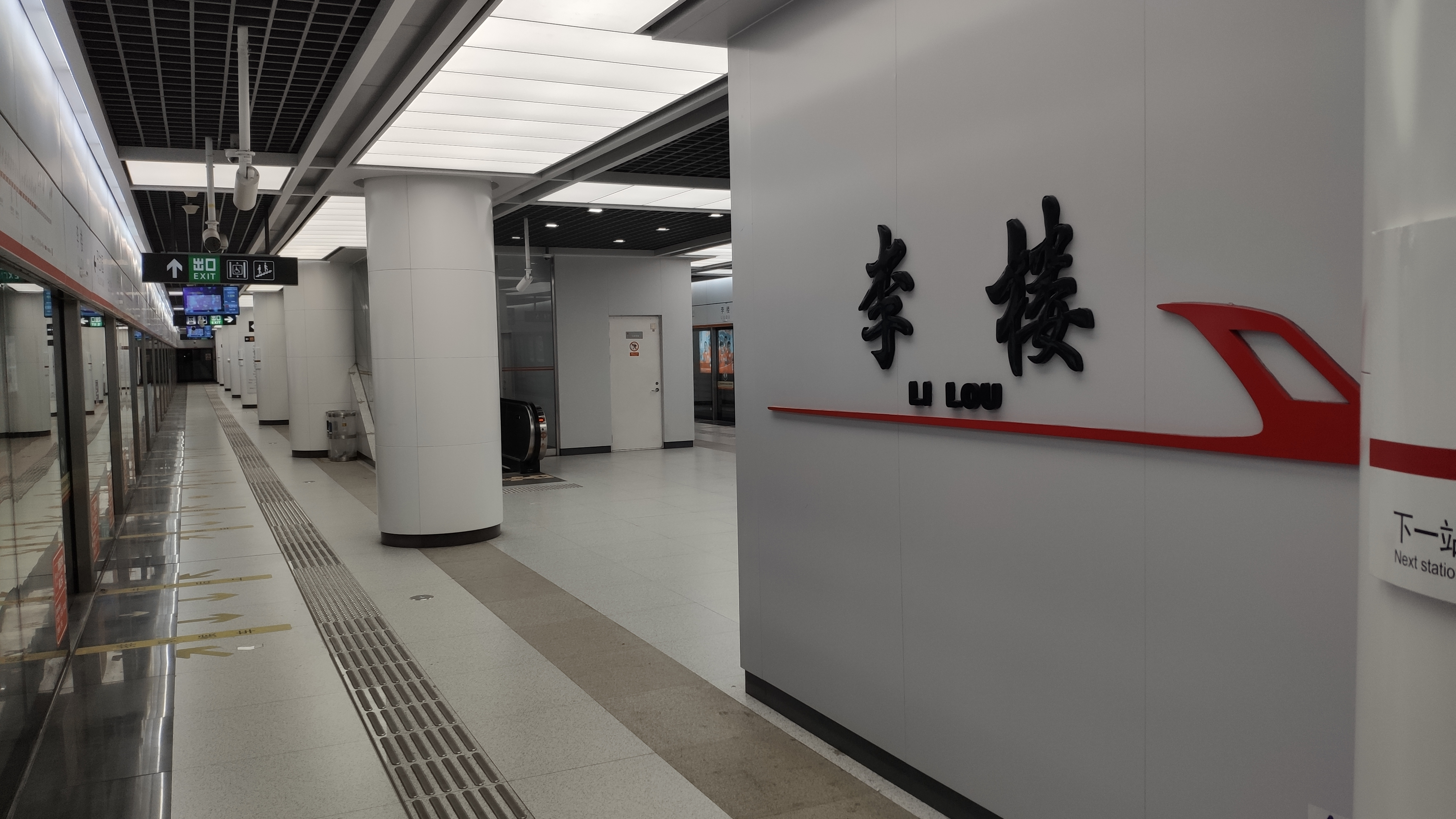
Platform
