= Jiayuanli station =

Metro station in Tianjin, China

Coordinates: 39°11′26″N 117°07′18″E

Jiayuanli 佳园里
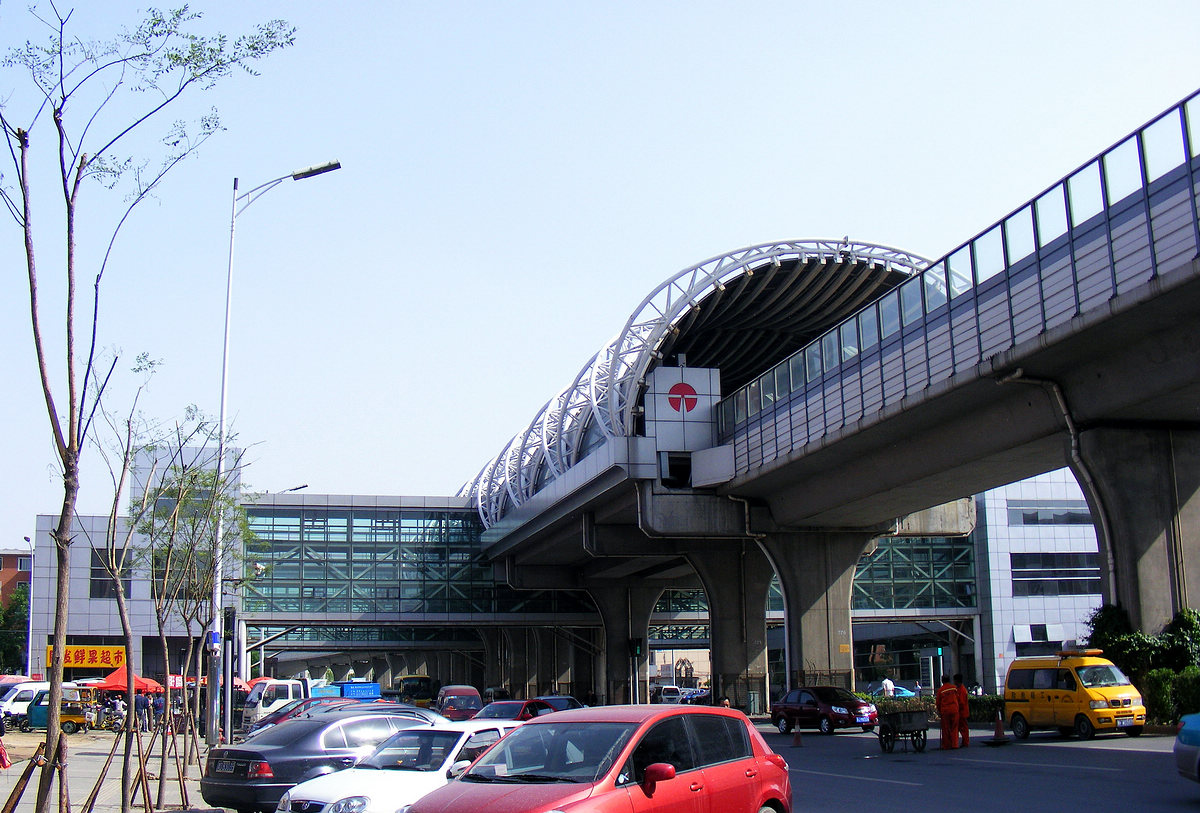

General information
- Location: Beichen District, Tianjin; China
- Operator: Tianjin Metro Co. Ltd.
- Line: Line 1

Construction
- Structure type: Underground and Elevated

History
- Opened: 12 June 2006

Services
Preceding station	Tianjin Metro	Following station
Benxilu towards Shuangqiaohe	Line 1	Ruijingxinyuan towards Liuyuan
Location

Jiayuanli Station (Chinese: 佳园里站), formerly Guojiuchang Station (Chinese: 果酒厂站), is a station of Line 1 of the Tianjin Metro. It started operations on 12 June 2006.
