= Qinjiandao station =

Metro station in Tianjin, China

Coordinates: 39°10′38″N 117°08′50″E

Qinjiandao 勤俭道
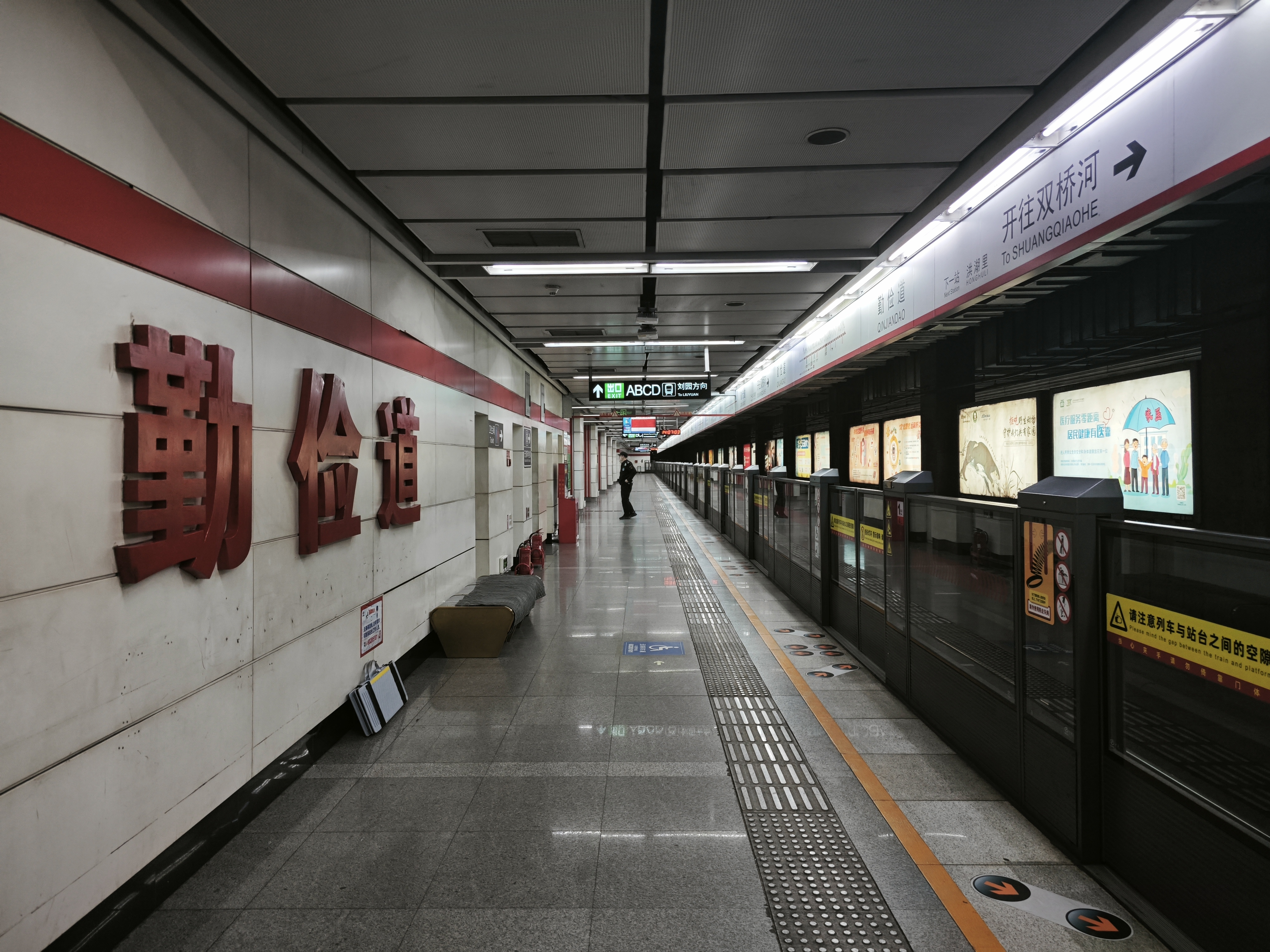

General information
- Other names: Qinjian Road
- Location: Hongqiao District, Tianjin; China
- Operated by: Tianjin Metro Co. Ltd.
- Line: Line 1

Construction
- Structure type: Underground

History
- Opened: 12 June 2006

Services
Preceding station	Tianjin Metro	Following station
Honghuli towards Shuangqiaohe	Line 1	Benxilu towards Liuyuan

Qinjiandao Station (Chinese: 勤俭道站), literally Qinjian Road Station in English, is a station of Line 1 of the Tianjin Metro. It started operations on 12 June 2006.
