= Fuxingmen station (Tianjin Metro) =

Tianjin Metro station

Fuxingmen 复兴门
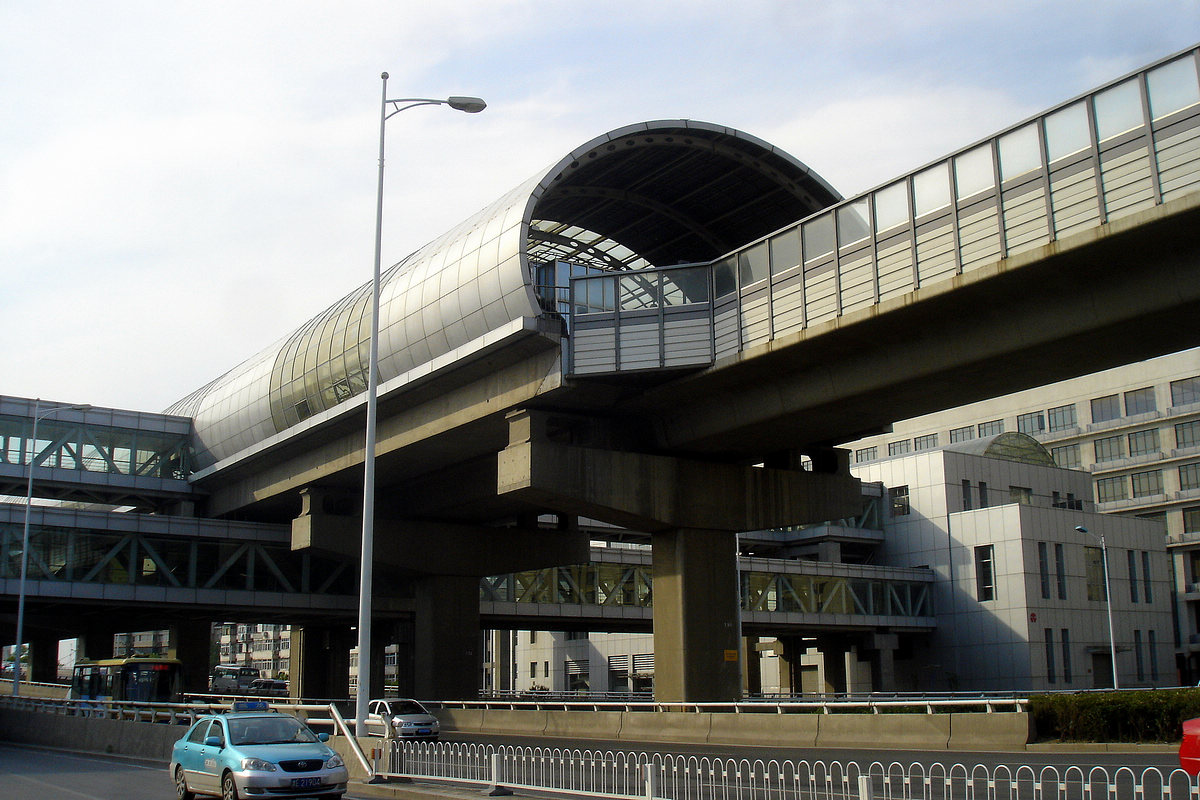

General information
- Location: Hexi District, Tianjin; China
- Coordinates: 39°04′34″N 117°15′14″E
- Operator: Tianjin Metro
- Line: Line 1
- Platforms: 2

History
- Opened: 12 June 2006

Services
Preceding station	Tianjin Metro	Following station
Huashanli towards Shuangqiaohe	Line 1	Chentangzhuang towards Liuyuan
Location

Fuxingmen Station (Chinese: 复兴门站) is an elevated rapid transit station located in Hexi District, Tianjin, China. It is a station on the Line 1 of the Tianjin Metro.

== Station configuration ==
Fuxingmen Station is an elevated station located on the median strip in the middle of Dagu South Road. The station consists of the platform level (level 2) and concourse level (level 1).

=== Concourse level ===
The concourse is located on the level 1. The passengers must check-in through ticket barriers before being allowed to enter the platforms. The station information centre can provide essential services, including ticket sales (including refills) and Lost and Found services. In addition, the station hall also has ticket vending machine, Shenzhen Development Bank automatic teller machines, and other self-service facilities.

=== Platforms ===
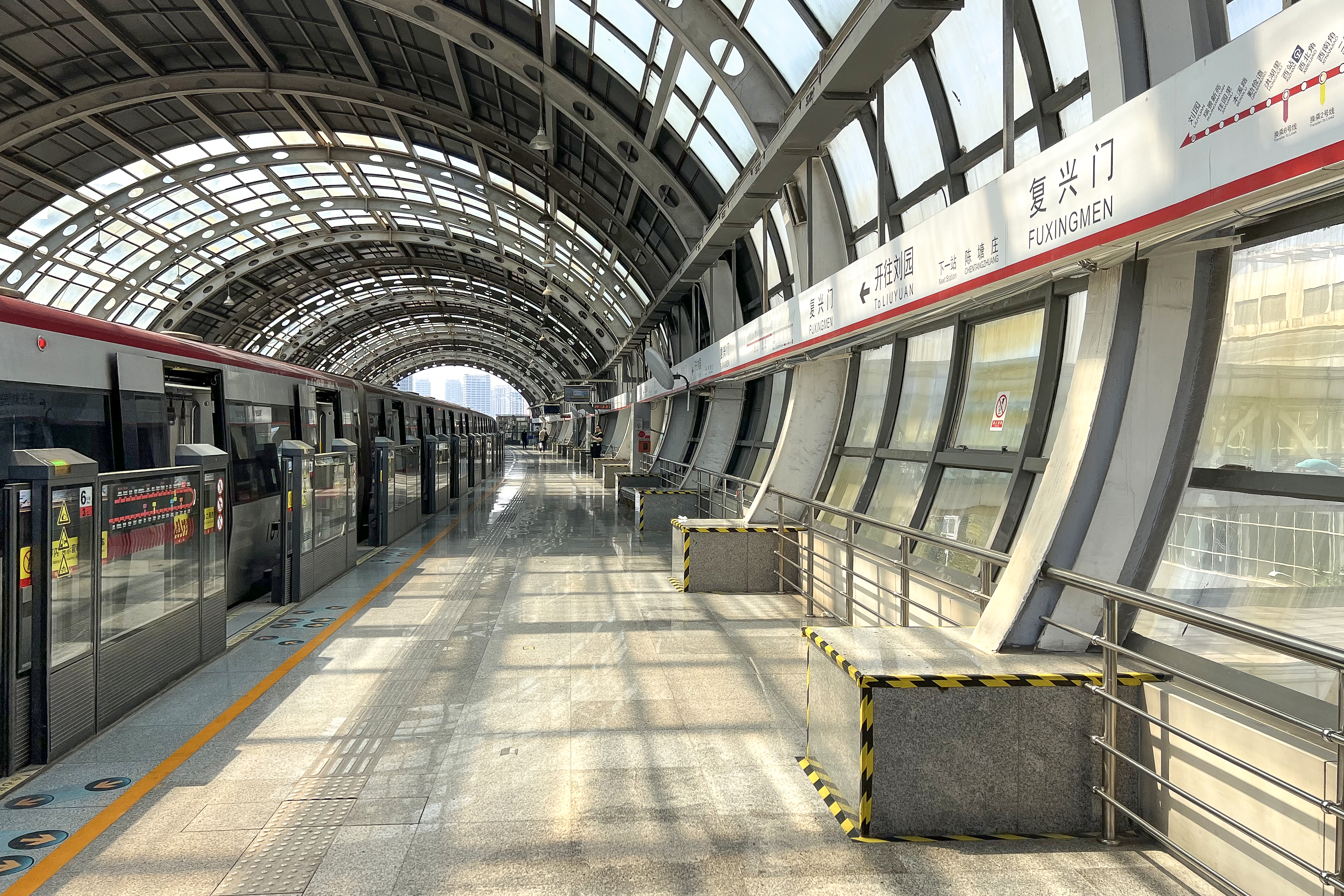
Westbound platform

The platforms are arranged in side platform configuration, each 3.5 metres wide. The platforms have platform screen doors (PSDs).

== Station exits ==
Fuxingmen Station has three exits, all of which are located on either side of Weishan Road. A is located on the north-east side and B and C on the south-west. The exits are linked to the main structure station via two connecting bridges which span across the road. There are 2 elevators available. The respective exits and the nearby facilities and attractions are listed below:

- Exit A - Fuxingzhimen Real Estate (复兴之门房地产), Fuxingbei Li (复兴北里), Shifang Yuan (世芳园), Ronghua Yuan (荣华园), Liuyuan Shequ (柳苑社区)
- Exit B - Tianjin Seamless Steel Tube Plant (天津市无缝钢管厂), Tianjin No. 1 Steel Cable Factory (天津市第一钢丝绳厂), Haihe Bridge (海河大桥), Non-staple Food Building (副食大楼), Duanlai Li (瑞来里)
- Exit C - Tianjin Harbour Engineering Research Institute (天津港湾工程研究所), Fuxingjia Yuan (幸福家园)

== Transport links ==
=== Buses ===
- No. 95, 97, 631, 656, 686, 695, 808, 823, 846, 855, 859, etc.
