= Erweilu station =

Metro station in Tianjin, China

Coordinates: 39°07′46″N 117°10′06″E

Erweilu 二纬路
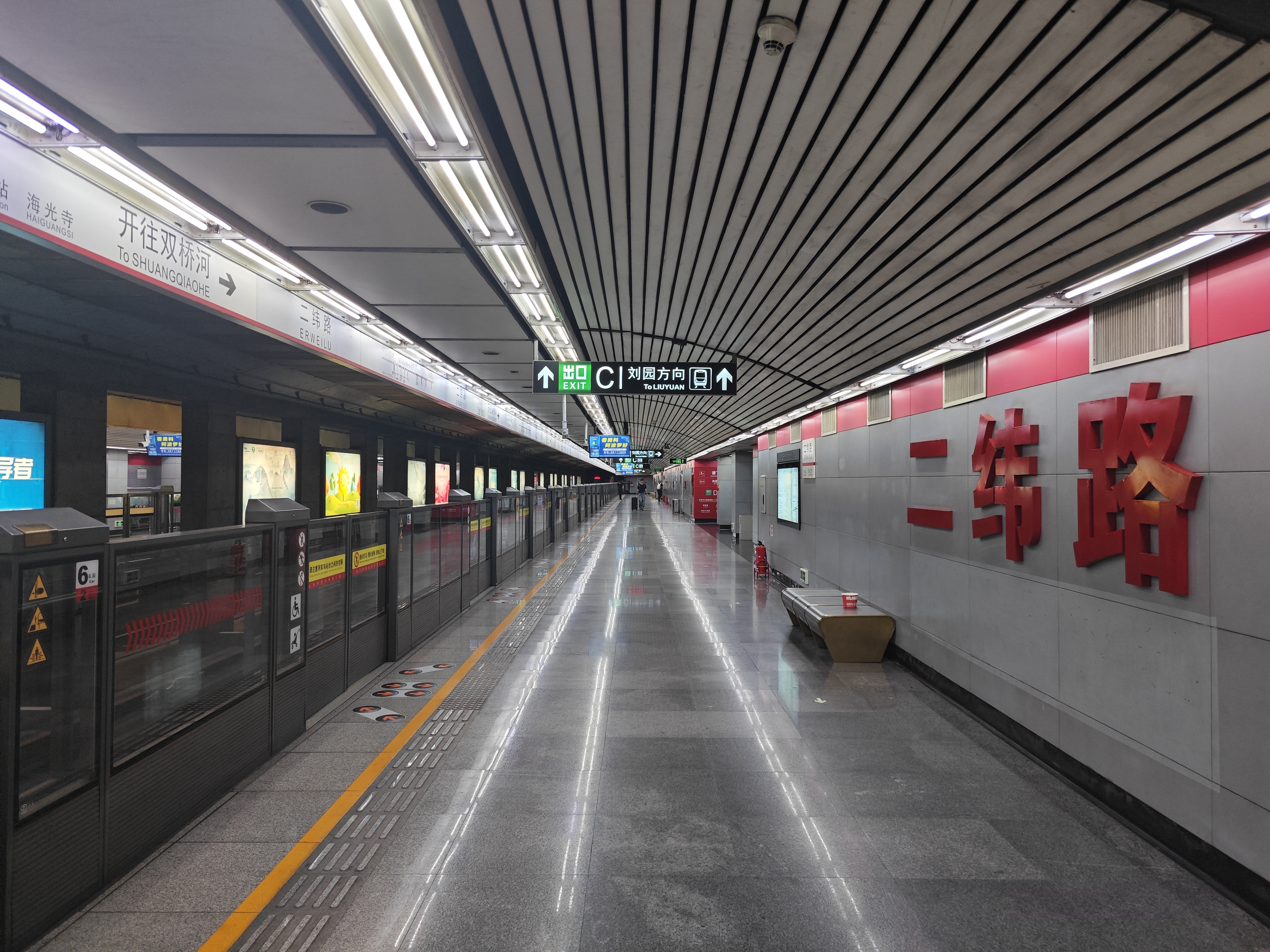

General information
- Other names: Erwei Road
- Location: Nankai District, Tianjin; China
- Operator: Tianjin Metro Co. Ltd.
- Line: Line 1

Construction
- Structure type: Underground

History
- Opened: 10 January 1980
- Rebuilt: 12 June 2006

Services
Preceding station	Tianjin Metro	Following station
Haiguangsi towards Shuangqiaohe	Line 1	Xi'nanjiao towards Liuyuan
Location

Erweilu Station (Chinese: 二纬路站), literally Erwei Road Station in English, is a station of Line 1 of the Tianjin Metro. It was part of the original metro line from 1984 to 2001, and was rebuilt as part of Line 1 in 2006.

== History ==
Erweilu was part of the original metro line, which operated in regular service from 1984 until 2001: it opened for intermittent trial operations on 10 January 1980, with full service starting on 28 December 1984. It was later temporarily closed with the original line on 9 October 2001, and reopened as part of Line 1 on 12 June 2006.
