= Nanlou station =

Metro station in Tianjin, China

Coordinates: 39°05′44″N 117°13′03″E

Nanlou 南楼
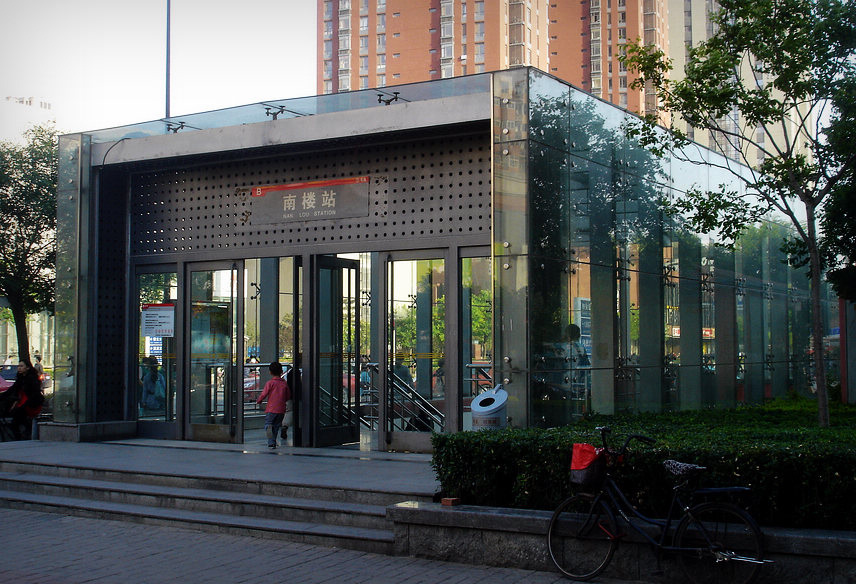

General information
- Location: Hexi District, Tianjin; China
- Operated by: Tianjin Metro Co. Ltd.
- Line(s): Line 1

Construction
- Structure type: Underground and Elevated

History
- Opened: 12 June 2006

Services
Preceding station	Tianjin Metro	Following station
Tucheng towards Shuangqiaohe	Line 1	Xiawafang towards Liuyuan

Nanlou Station (Chinese: 南楼站) is a station of Line 1 of the Tianjin Metro. It started operations on 12 June 2006.
