= Benxilu station =

Metro station in Tianjin, China

Coordinates: 39°11′03″N 117°07′59″E

Benxilu 本溪路
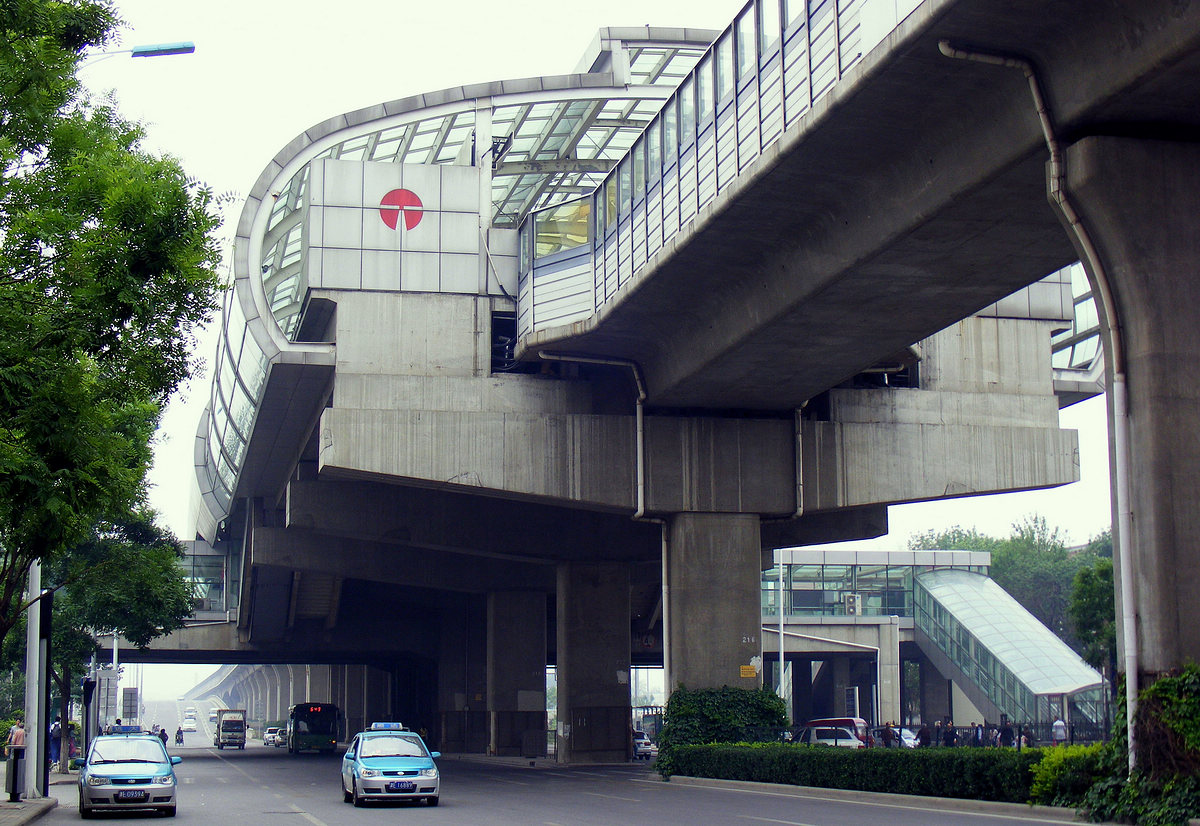

General information
- Other names: Benxi Road
- Location: Hongqiao District, Tianjin; China
- Operator: Tianjin Metro Co. Ltd.
- Line: Line 1

Construction
- Structure type: Underground and Elevated

History
- Opened: 12 June 2006

Services
Preceding station	Tianjin Metro	Following station
Qinjiandao towards Shuangqiaohe	Line 1	Guojiuchang towards Liuyuan
Location

Benxilu Station (Chinese: 本溪路站), literally the Benxi Road Station in English, is a station on Line 1 of the Tianjin Metro. It began operations on June 12, 2006.
