= Xi'nanjiao station =

Tianjin Metro station

Coordinates: 39°08′11″N 117°09′56″E

Xi'nanjiao 西南角
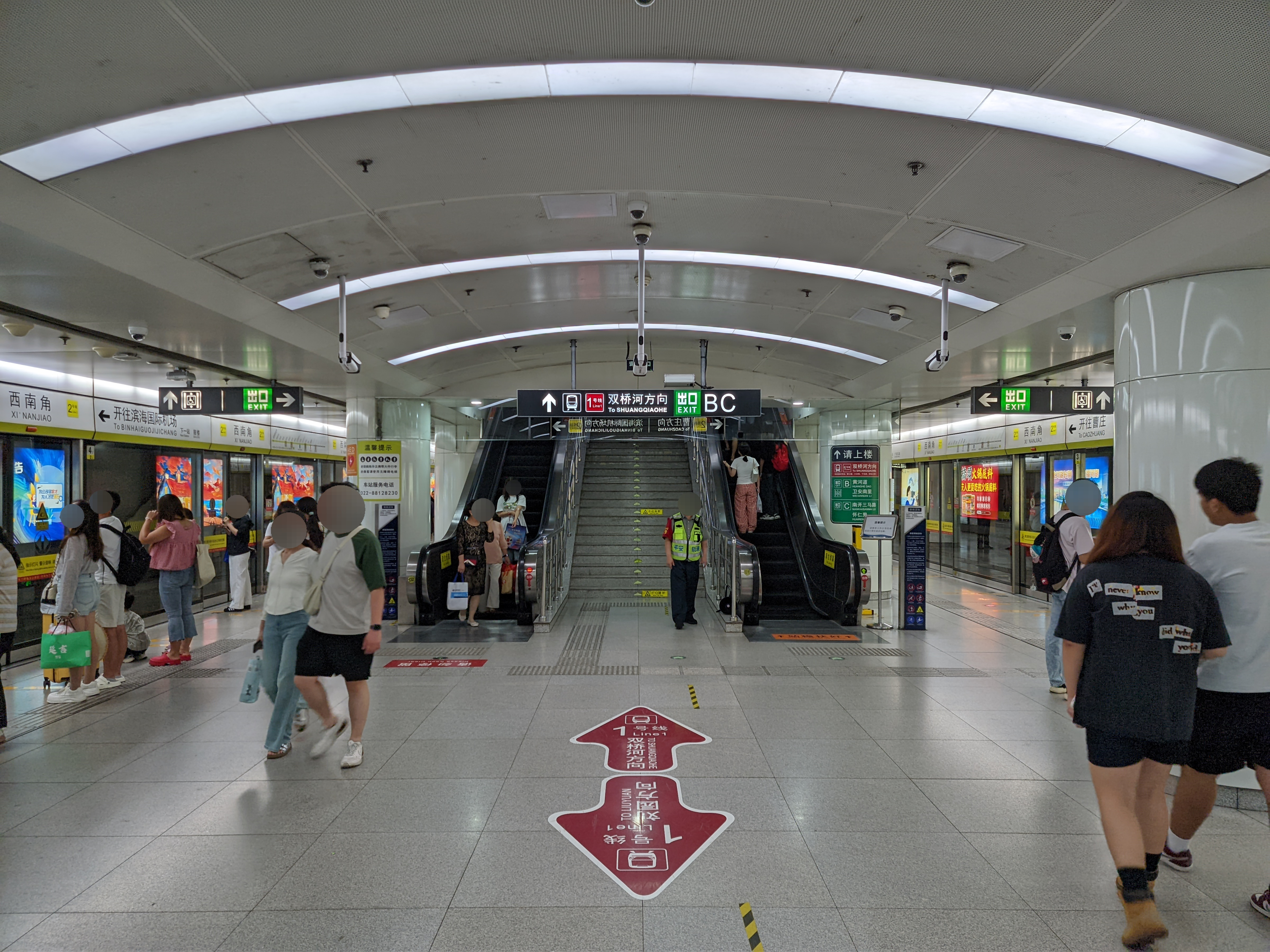
- Line 2 platform

General information
- Location: Nankai District, Tianjin; China
- Operator: Tianjin Metro Co. Ltd.
- Lines: Line 1; Line 2

Construction
- Structure type: Underground

History
- Opened: 10 January 1980 (Line 1); 1 July 2012 (Line 2)
- Rebuilt: 12 June 2006 (Line 1)

Services
Preceding station	Tianjin Metro	Following station
Erweilu towards Shuangqiaohe	Line 1	Xibeijiao towards Liuyuan
Guangkaisimalu towards Caozhuang	Line 2	Gulou towards Binhaiguojijichang
Location

Xi'nanjiao Station (Chinese: 西南角站) is a station of Line 1 and Line 2 of the Tianjin Metro. It was part of the original metro line from 1984 to 2001, and was rebuilt as part of Line 1 in 2006.

== History ==
Xi'nanjiao was part of the original metro line, which operated in regular service from 1984 until 2001: it opened for intermittent trial operations on 10 January 1980, with full service starting on 28 December 1984. It was later temporarily closed with the original line on 9 October 2001, and reopened as part of Line 1 on 12 June 2006.
