= Xiaobailou station =

Metro station in Tianjin, China

Coordinates: 39°06′49″N 117°12′36″E

Xiaobailou 小白楼
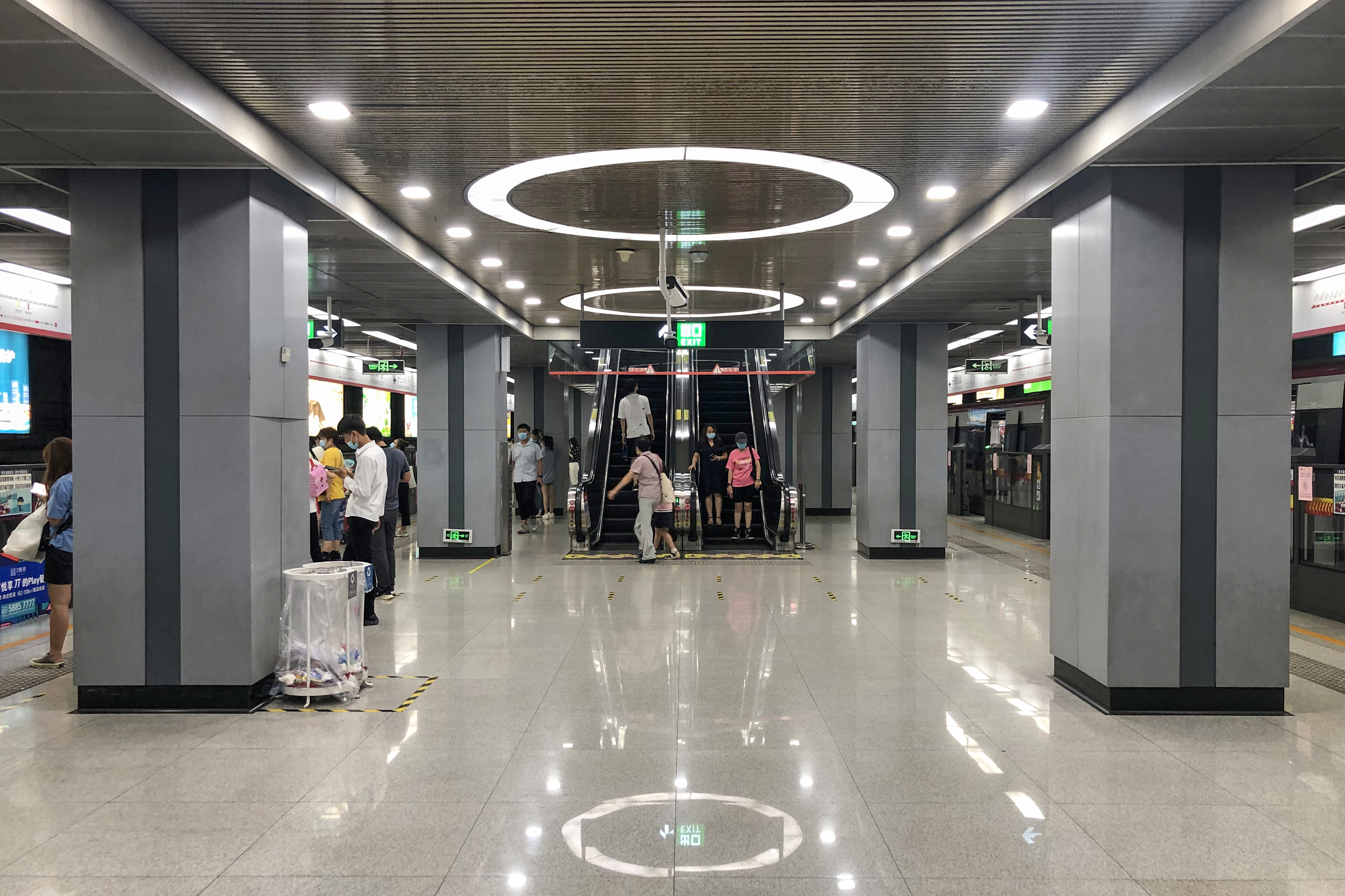
- Station platform

Chinese name
- Traditional Chinese: 小白樓站
- Simplified Chinese: 小白楼站
- Literal meaning: little white building
Transcriptions
Standard Mandarin
- Wade–Giles: hsiao^{3} pai^{2} lou^{2} chan^{4}

General information
- Location: Heping District, Tianjin; China
- Operated by: Tianjin Metro Co. Ltd.
- Line: Line 1

Construction
- Structure type: Underground and Elevated

History
- Opened: 12 June 2006

Services
Preceding station	Tianjin Metro	Following station
Xiawafang towards Shuangqiaohe	Line 1	Yingkoudao towards Liuyuan

Xiaobailou Station (simplified Chinese: 小白楼站; traditional Chinese: 小白樓站; Wade–Giles: hsiao^{3} pai^{2} lou^{2} chan^{4}; lit. 'little white building') is a station of Line 1 of the Tianjin Metro. It started operations on 12 June 2006. The station serves a large number of riders, as it is in close proximity to several shopping malls as well as the Tianjin Concert Hall.
