= Honghuli station =

Metro station in Tianjin, China

Coordinates: 39°10′14″N 117°09′20″E

Honghuli 洪湖里
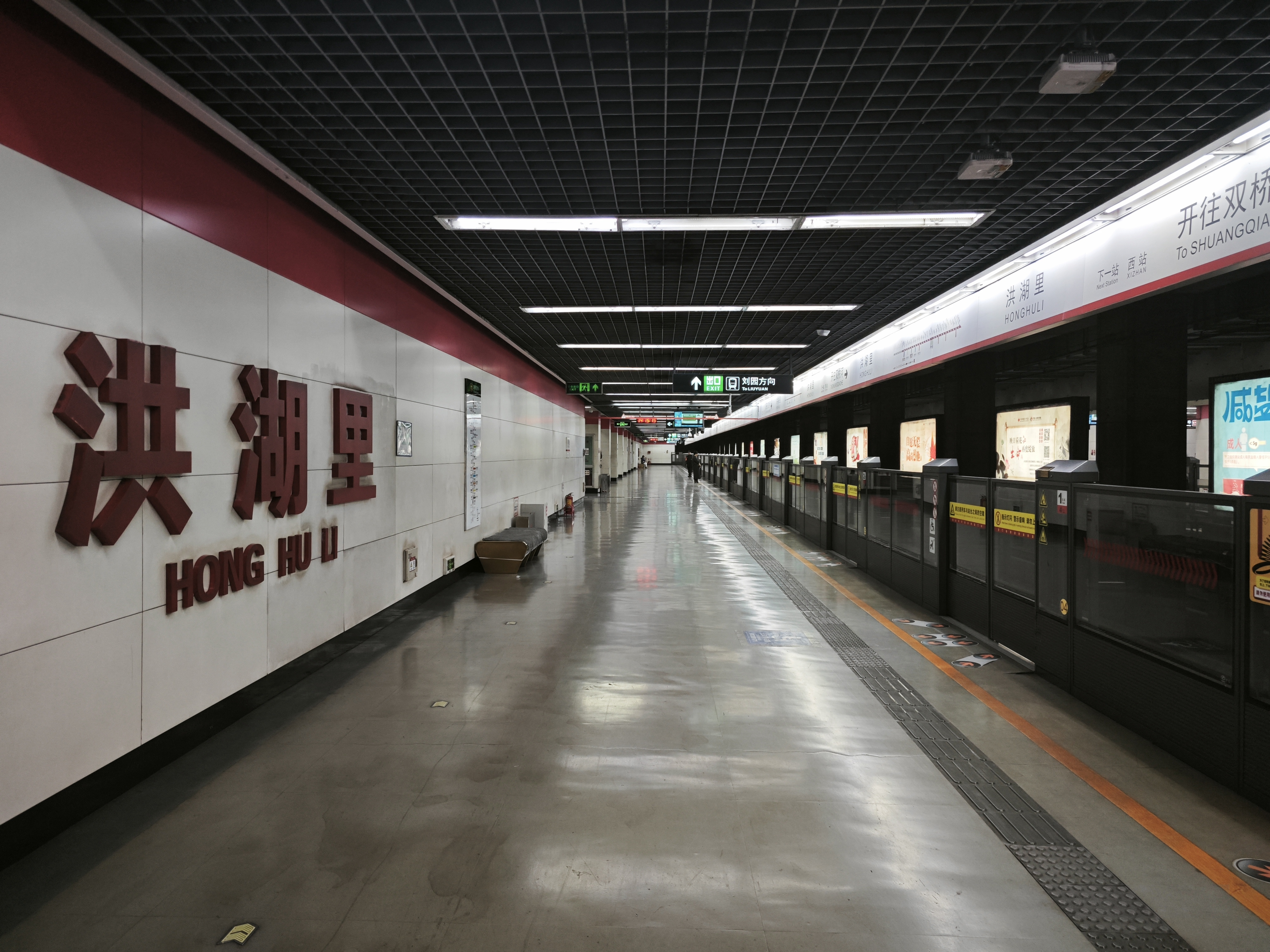

General information
- Location: Hongqiao District, Tianjin; China
- Operator: Tianjin Metro Co. Ltd.
- Line: Line 1

Construction
- Structure type: Underground and Elevated

History
- Opened: 12 June 2006

Services
| Preceding station | Tianjin Metro | Following station |
|---|---|---|
| Xizhan towards Shuangqiaohe | Line 1 | Qinjiandao towards Liuyuan |
Location

Honghuli Station (Chinese: 洪湖里站) is a station of Line 1 of the Tianjin Metro. It started operations on 12 June 2006.
