= Xibeijiao station =

Metro station in Tianjin, China

Coordinates: 39.1462°N 117.1646°E

Xibeijiao 西北角
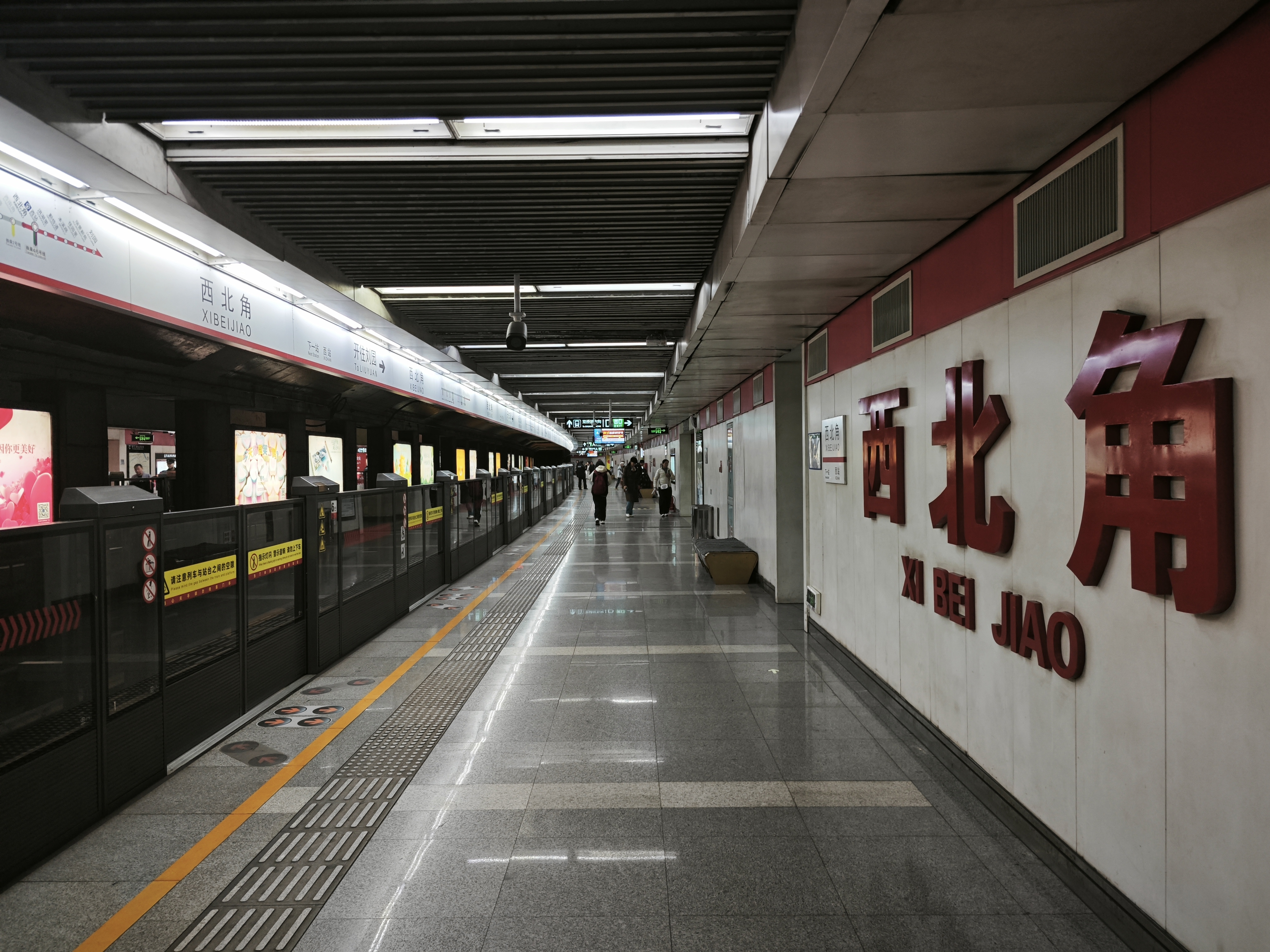

General information
- Location: Hongqiao District, Tianjin; China
- Operator: Tianjin Metro Co. Ltd.
- Line: Line 1

Construction
- Structure type: Underground

History
- Opened: 28 December 1984
- Rebuilt: 12 June 2006

Services
Preceding station	Tianjin Metro	Following station
Xi'nanjiao towards Shuangqiaohe	Line 1	Xizhan towards Liuyuan
Location

Xibeijiao Station (Chinese: 西北角站) is a station of Line 1 of the Tianjin Metro. It was part of the original metro line from 1984 to 2001, and was rebuilt as part of Line 1 in 2006.

== History ==
Xibeijiao was part of the original metro line, which operated in regular service from 28 December 1984 until 9 October 2001: it was then rebuilt and reopened with the upgraded Line 1 on 12 June 2006.
