= Line 1 (Tianjin Metro) =

Metro line in Tianjin, China

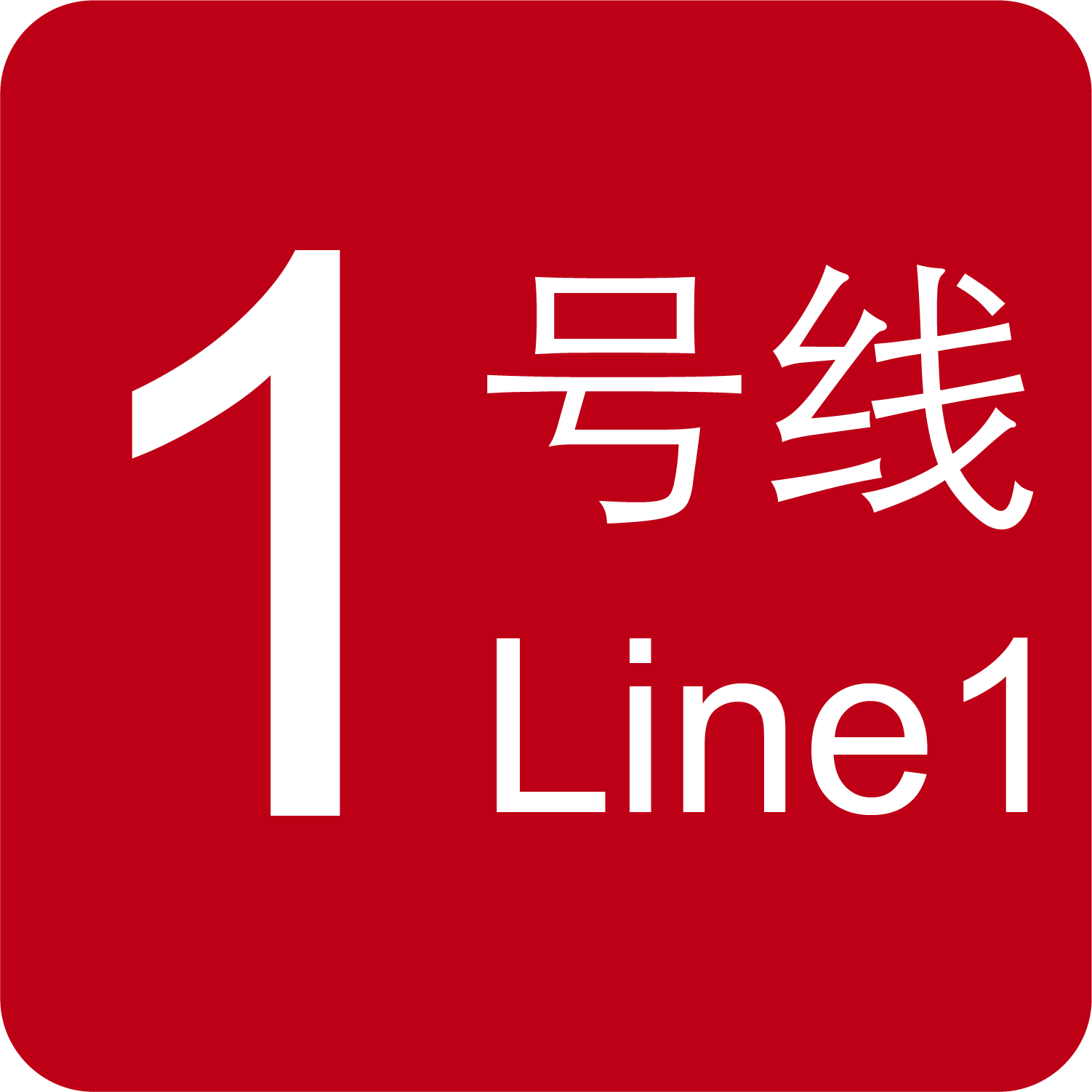

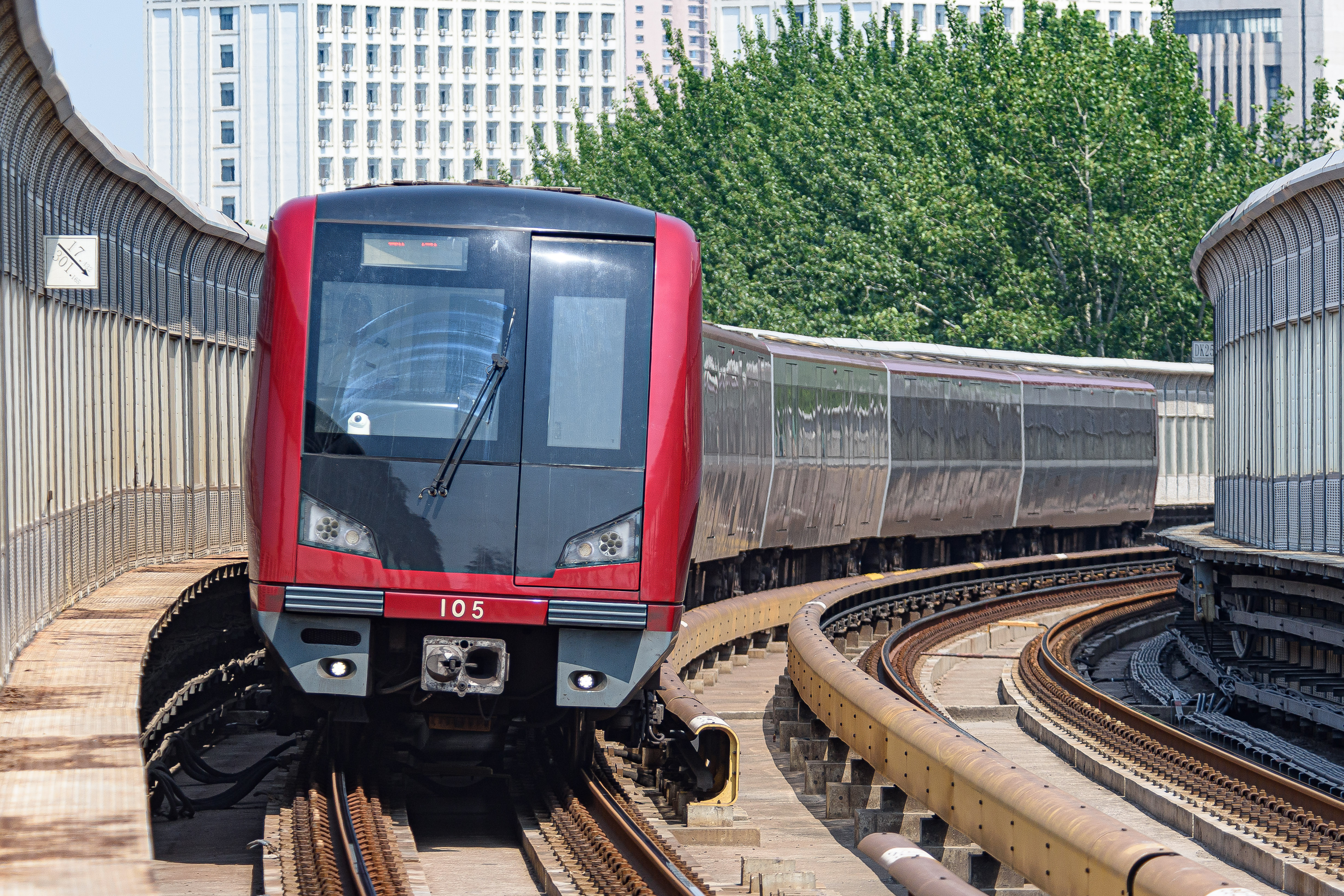
- A train at Caijingdaxue station

Overview
- Status: Operational
- Owner: Tianjin City Infrastructure Construction and Investment Group Ltd.
- Locale: Tianjin, China
- Termini: Shuangqiaohe; Liuyuan
- Stations: 32 (29 in operation)

Service
- Type: Rapid transit
- System: Tianjin Metro
- Services: 1
- Operator(s): Tianjin Line 1 Rail Transit Operation Co., Ltd.

History
- Opened: 28 December 1984; 41 years ago (old system); 12 June 2006; 20 years ago (new system)
- Closed: 2001 to 2006

Technical
- Line length: 42.227 km (26.2 mi)
- Num of tracks: 2
- Character: Underground, At-grade, & Elevated
- Track gauge: 1,435 mm (4 ft 8 1/2 in)

Line 1 of the Tianjin Metro (Chinese: 天津地铁一号线; pinyin: Tiānjīn Dìtiě Yī Hào Xiàn) runs from the north-west to the south-east of downtown Tianjin. It is 42.227 km (26.2 mi) in length with 32 stations (currently 29 stations in operation).

The line started operations on 12 June 2006. It was rebuilt from the original Tianjin Metro line, which opened in 1976, but had to close down and undergo renovations in 2001 as part of the system's modernizing project. The line's color is red.

== History ==
Construction of the original metro line began in 1970, as part of a civil defence programme, but it suffered from numerous suspensions. The first section of the "old metro" – 3.6 km long with four stations (Xinhualu, Yingkoudao, Anshandao and Haiguangsi) – opened for intermittent trial operations in February 1976, and trial service was extended 1.6 km north to Erweilu and Xi'nanjiao on 10 January 1980. Regular service on the "old metro" finally began on 28 December 1984, when the line reached 7.4 km with 8 stations between Xizhan in the north and Xinhualu in the east.

To cut construction costs, the authority used an abandoned canal bed to build part of the system. Thus the underground section is only 2–3 meters beneath the street surface, and was the world's shallowest metro. Years later, train frequency reduced and trains were commonly delayed. The rolling stock had become dilapidated, with most seat covers torn off, and lights becoming dim. To change to a more modern and cleaner system, a modernization plan was laid out in 2000. In preparation, the system was closed on 1 September 2001, with renovation starting on 21 November after being delayed due to the terrorist attacks of 11 September. After introducing new rolling stock, adding half-height platform screen doors and extending the line to Shuanglin, the line was completed at the end of 2005 and re-opened on 12 June 2006.

In 2008, Xizhan station was temporarily closed for the reconstruction of Tianjin West railway station. It reopened on 1 July 2011.

In 2016, the at-grade Shuanglin station was closed. On 3 December 2018, Shuanglin station was reopened as a new underground station.

On 3 December 2018, Line 1 also extended by one station, from Shuanglin station to Lilou station.

On 28 December 2019, four stations on the eastern extension (Gaozhuangzi, Beiyangcun, Guozhanlu, Donggulu) were opened.

On 12 May 2021, Beiyangcun station was renamed to Guojiahuizhanzhongxin station, and Guozhanlu station was renamed to Guoruilu station.

Hongnihedong station opened on 31 July 2023.

A two-station extension from Donggulu station to the new terminus at Shuangqiaohe station, with a not yet opened station at Xianshuigubei, opened on 1 July 2024.

The signal system was also replaced by the new ATO system, and the running stock was also overhauled.

== Details ==
- Coaches per train - 6.
- Frequency - 3-4 minutes in peak hours & 8 minutes at other times.
- Operating hours - 5:30 to 22:30.

== Infrastructure ==
=== Alignment and interchanges ===
The line is underground between Qinjiandao and Tucheng stations, as well as Shuanglin and Lilou. The other nine stations are elevated. All elevated stations are entirely covered by a mixture of transparent & opaque corrugated sheets. The line passes through six districts, namely Beichen, Hongqiao, Nankai, Heping, Hexi and Jinnan. The whole journey takes about 50 minutes. The line is interchange with other metro lines: Lines 2, 3, 5 and 6. And interchanges to future lines will be available with Lines 4, 7, 8 and 10.

=== Concourse Level ===
All line 1 station concourses are equipped with a customer service center, ticket vending machines, automatic fare gates, and bank ATMs.

=== Platform level ===
For security and other reasons, all line 1 stations have platform-edge doors installed. TVs are installed that display travel tips, advertising, alerts, and waiting time for the next train.

== Opening timeline ==
Segment	Commencement	Length
Xinhualu — Xi'nanjiao	10 August 1980	5.2 km (3.2 mi)
Xi'nanjiao — Xizhan	28 December 1984	2.2 km (1.4 mi)
Xinhualu	9 October 2001	Permanently ceased operation
Xiaobailou — Xizhan	9 October 2001	Temporary ceased operation
Shuanglin — Xiaobailou	12 June 2006	10.6 km (6.6 mi)
Xiaobailou — Xizhan	12 June 2006	Reentered operation
Xizhan — Liuyuan	12 June 2006	8.2 km (5.1 mi)
Shuanglin (old at-grade station)	28 December 2016	Old at-grade station closed
Shuanglin (new underground station)	3 December 2018	New underground station opened
Shuanglin — Lilou	3 December 2018	16.039 km (10.0 mi) until the depot at Shuangqiaohe
Lilou — Donggulu	28 December 2019	16.039 km (10.0 mi) until the depot at Shuangqiaohe
Donggulu — Shuanglin	9 January 2022	16.039 km (10.0 mi) until the depot at Shuangqiaohe
Hongnihedong	31 July 2023	Infill station
Donggulu — Shuangqiaohe	1 July 2024	

== Stations (southeast to northwest) ==
Service route	Station name		Connections	Bus Connections	Distance km		Location
Service route	English	Chinese	Connections	Bus Connections	Distance km		Location
●	Shuangqiaohe	双桥河					Jinnan
｜	Xianshuigubei	咸水沽北					Jinnan
●	Donggulu	东沽路		204 212西线 217 219 224 226东线 226西线			Jinnan
●	Guoruilu	国瑞路		202 204 212西线 214 217 219 224 226东线 226西线 228 309 国展定制1线 国展定制2线 国展定制3线 国展定制4线			Jinnan
●	Guojiahuizhanzhongxin	国家会展中心		202 214 228 309			Jinnan
｜	Shangguozhuang	上郭庄					Jinnan
●	Gaozhuangzi	高庄子		202 214 214区间			Jinnan
●	Hongnihedong	洪泥河东					Jinnan
｜	Lishuanglubei	梨双路北					Jinnan
●	Lilou	李楼		216 220 342 374 629 652北线 652北线区间 652快线 655 808 855			Jinnan
●	Shuanglin	双林		93 215 662	0.00	0.00	Jinnan
●	Caijingdaxue	财经大学	Tianjin Metro Line 10	93 336 342 374 605 665 676 686 706 846 846区间 859 通勤665	1.61	1.61	Hexi
●	Huashanli	华山里	(OSI via Dongjiangdao)	304 326北环 326南环 613 623 631 锦堂菜市场免费班车5号线	1.48	3.09	Hexi
●	Fuxingmen	复兴门		95 97 216 220 321 529 623 631 655 656 686 693 808 846 846区间 855 859 通勤220 通学6	1.33	4.42	Hexi
●	Chentangzhuang	陈塘庄		93 95 97 529 629 631 652北线 652北线区间 676 693 808 835 855 859 观光1 通学6	1.23	5.65	Hexi
●	Tucheng	土城	Tianjin Metro Line 8	20 95 96 96区间 158 186 186快线 529 631 652北线区间 652快线 659 659区间 676 682 688 693 697 808 835 855 858 859 908 954 观光1 通学6	1.59	7.24	Hexi
●	Nanlou	南楼		20 631 659 659区间 665 668 685 697 858 867 868 963 通勤665	1.10	8.34	Hexi
●	Xiawafang	下瓦房	Tianjin Metro Line 5 Tianjin Metro Line 8	3 20 175 186 369 511 608 631 641 652快线 659 659区间 665 668 685 688 760 846 860 867 868 962 963 通勤665 专线678	1.05	9.39	Hexi
●	Xiaobailou	小白楼	(OSI via Xuzhoudao)	3 20 97 503 604 629 631 632 641 652北线 657 659 685 693 830 846 867 904 953 962 佛罗伦萨小镇免费班车1号线 津游1线 专线678	1.45	10.84	Heping / Hexi
●	Yingkoudao	营口道	Tianjin Metro Line 3	3 45 50 503 600内环 600外环 631 632 641 643 657 659 669 673 800 840 842 847 851 865 867 870 901 906 954 金街观光车 津游1线 通勤842 专线678	1.51	12.35	Heping
●	Anshandao	鞍山道		3 8 45 50 600内环 600外环 606 631 632 641 643 657 659 669 673 800 840 842 847 851 865 867 870 878 901 906 908 954 观光2 通勤842 专线678	0.87	13.22	Heping
●	Haiguangsi	海光寺	Tianjin Metro Line 7	3 12 156 161 168 169 180 180独流区间 184 184区间 193 503 588 600内外环 600外环 606 609 628 631 632 633 638 641 646 657 658 659 669 673 675 681 800 829 832 840 855 858 865 867 870 878 906 908 952 954 观光2 通勤3 通勤832	0.93	14.15	Nankai
●	Erweilu	二纬路		12 600内环 600外环 631 639西线 640 669 673 800 841 849 863 905 906 952 961	1.06	15.21	Nankai
●	Xi'nanjiao	西南角	Tianjin Metro Line 2	191 628 645 645区间 669 673 676 837 849 860 863 903 通勤3	0.78	15.99	Nankai
●	Xibeijiao	西北角		12 24 52 192 461 469 516市区线 588 600内环 600外环 628 631 634 639西线 672 687 800 836 837 852 856 861 863 865 903 906 907 952 962 观光3	1.02	17.01	Hongqiao / Nankai
●	Xizhan	西站	TXP	10 15 24 31 52 153 158 161 168 169 461 469 503 588 601 635 651 652北线 652快线 661 687 688 746 810 829 840 910 公墓定制专线6 通勤651	1.23	18.24	Hongqiao
●	Honghuli	洪湖里		367 622 810 860 869 879 952	1.66	19.90	Hongqiao
●	Qinjiandao	勤俭道		47 47区间 48 48区间 606 658 952 962	1.15	21.05	Hongqiao
●	Benxilu	本溪路		34 34小圈 37 345 351 602 606 634 700 725 725区间 732 962 通勤850	1.45	22.50	Hongqiao
●	Jiayuanli	佳园里		34 34小圈 37 351 602 606 634 649 700 725 725区间 732 865 962 快速2 通勤725 通勤快速2	1.24	23.74	Beichen
●	Ruijingxinyuan	瑞景新苑		34 34小圈 602 649 700 725 725区间 732 962 快速2 通勤649 通勤725	1.06	24.80	Beichen
●	Liuyuan	刘园		34 34小圈 174 317 318 332 602 634 649 725 725区间 734 735 742 743 745 752 766 770 909 通勤332 通勤649 通勤725 通勤732 通勤快速2	1.00	25.80	Beichen

== Future Development ==
=== Xinhualu station ===
Xinhualu station, between Yingkoudao and Xiaobailou, was closed in 2001. The station will be reopened to public in future.

== Rolling Stock ==
Type	Time of manufacturing	Series	Sets	Assembly	Notes
Type B	2005 - 2006	DKZ9/DKZ12	25	Tc+M+T+M+M+Tc	Manufactured by CRRC Changchun Railway Vehicles
Type B	2016	Unknown	19	Tc+M+T+M+M+Tc	Manufactured by CRRC Tangshan
Type B	2024	Unknown	16	Tc+M+T+M+M+Tc	Manufactured by CRRC Tangshan

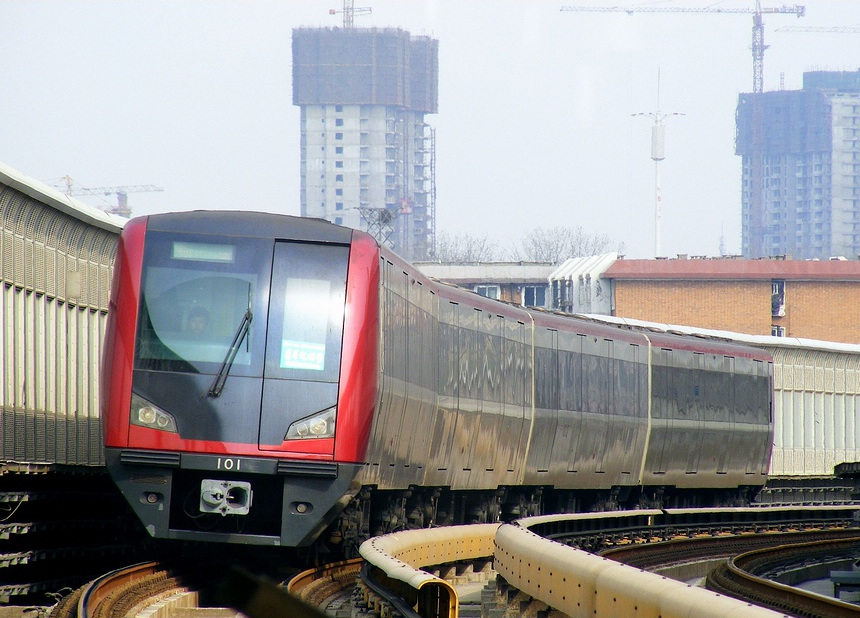
Line 1 train exterior

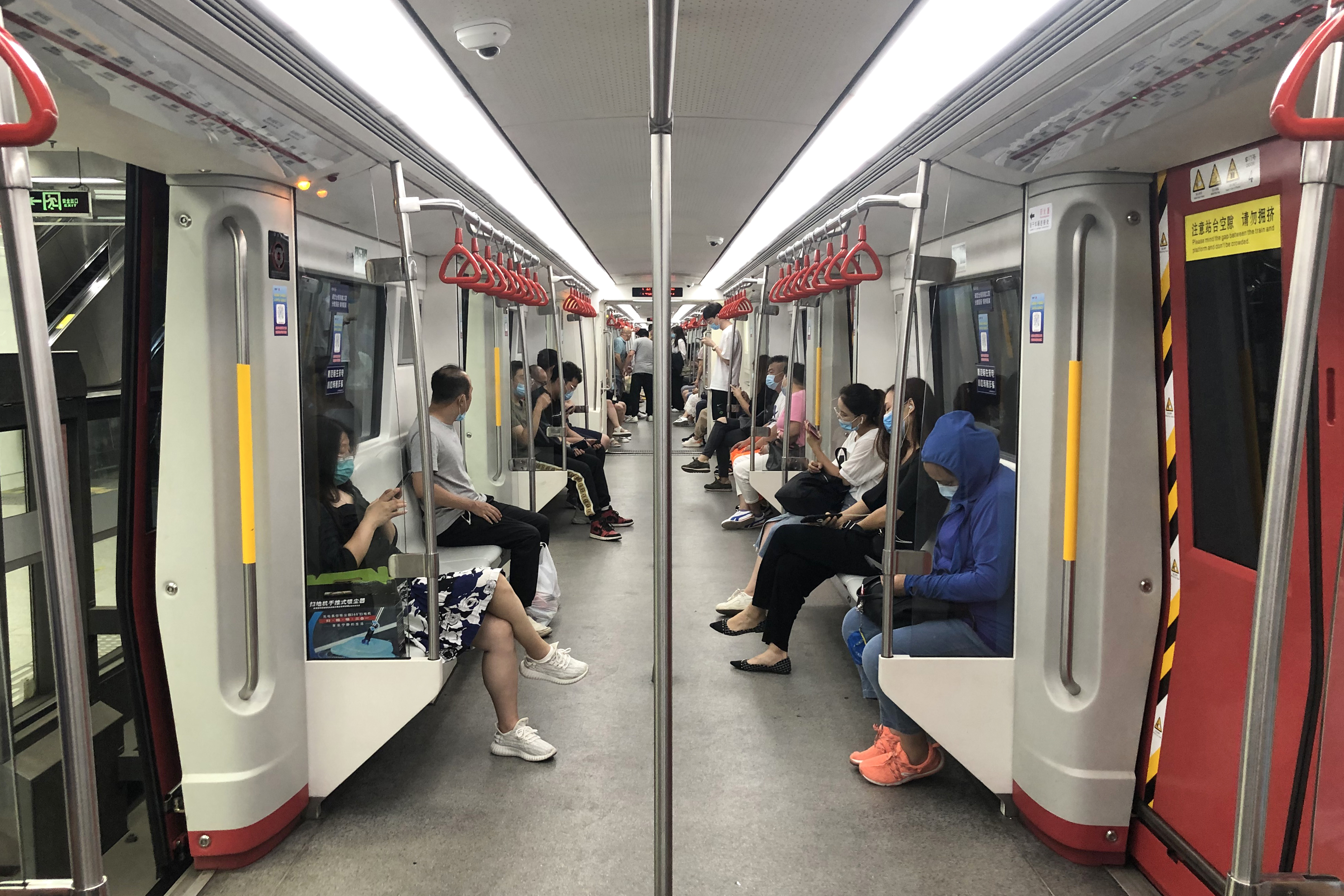
Line 1 train interior
