= Xiawafang station =

Metro station in Tianjin, China

Coordinates: 39°06′15″N 117°13′00″E

Xiawafang 下瓦房
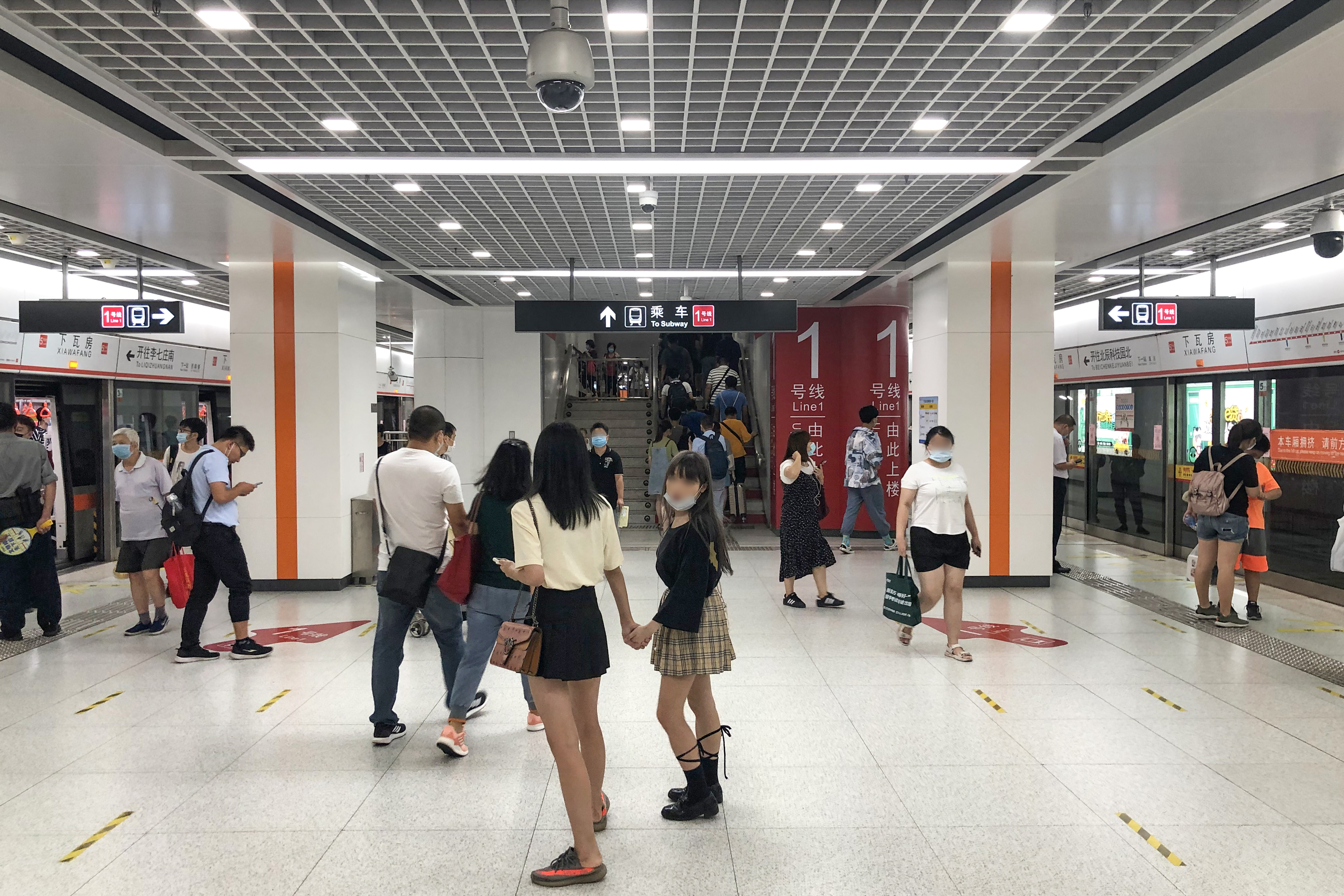
- Line 5 platform in August 2020

General information
- Location: Hexi District, Tianjin; China
- Operator: Tianjin Metro Co. Ltd.
- Lines: Line 1 Line 5
- Platforms: 4 (2 island platforms)

Construction
- Structure type: Underground

History
- Opened: 12 June 2006 (Line 1); 22 October 2018 (Line 5)

Services
Preceding station	Tianjin Metro	Following station
Nanlou towards Shuangqiaohe	Line 1	Xiaobailou towards Liuyuan
Zhigu towards Beichenkejiyuanbei	Line 5	Xi'nanlou towards Jinghuadongdao
Location

Xiawafang Station (Chinese: 下瓦房站) is a station of Line 1 and Line 5 of the Tianjin Metro. It started operations on 12 June 2006.
