= Chentangzhuang station =

Metro station in Tianjin, China

Coordinates: 39°04′57″N 117°14′32″E

Chentangzhuang 陈塘庄
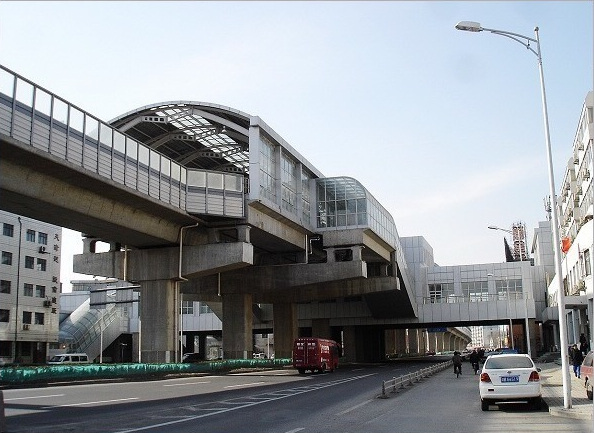

General information
- Location: Hexi District, Tianjin; China
- Operated by: Tianjin Metro Co. Ltd.
- Line(s): Line 1

Construction
- Structure type: Underground and Elevated

History
- Opened: 12 June 2006

Services
Preceding station	Tianjin Metro	Following station
Fuxingmen towards Shuangqiaohe	Line 1	Tucheng towards Liuyuan

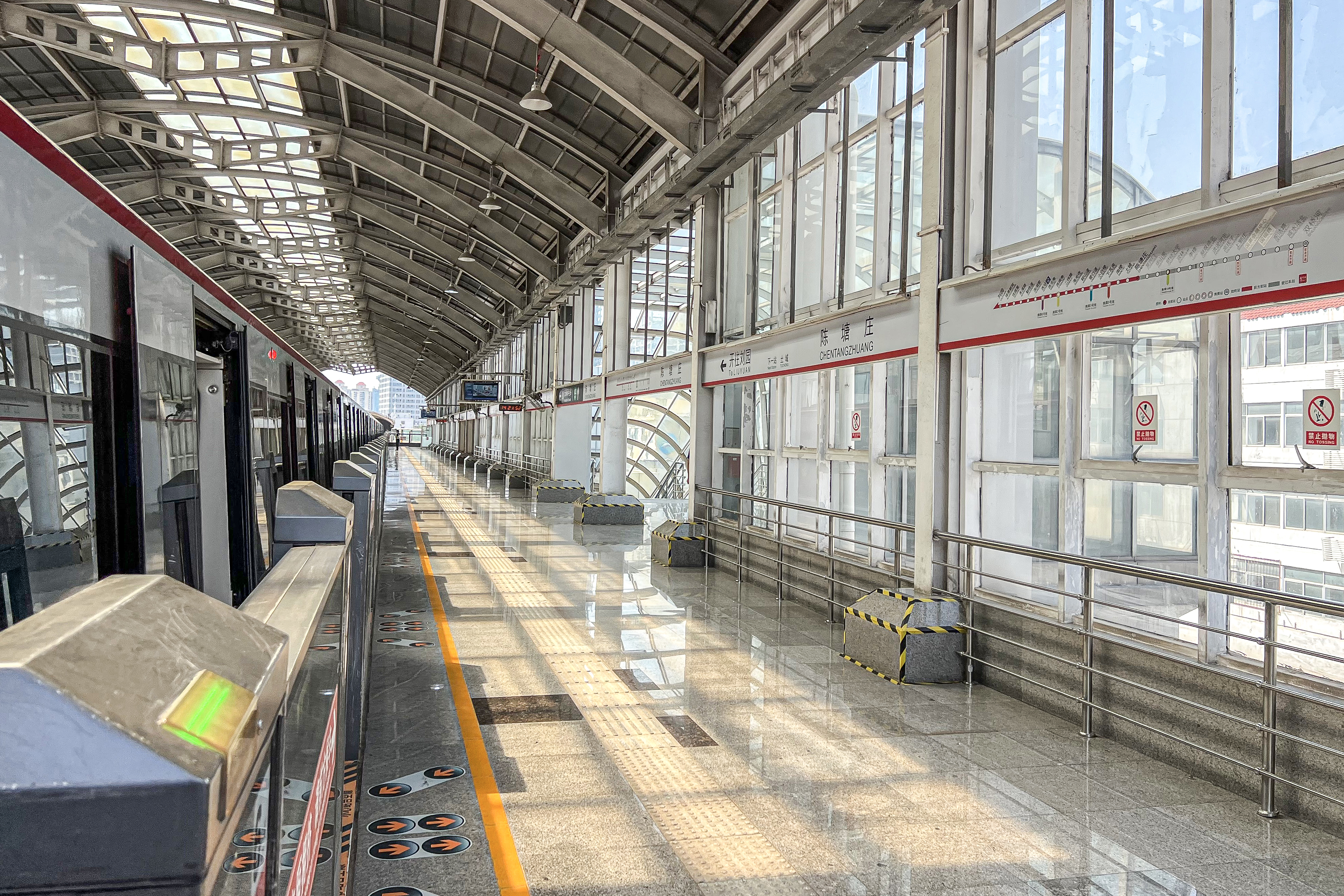
Platform

Chentangzhuang Station (Chinese: 陈塘庄站) is a station of Line 1 of the Tianjin Metro. It started operations on 12 June 2006.
