= Haiguangsi station =

Metro station in Tianjin, China

Coordinates: 39°07′13″N 117°10′24″E

Haiguangsi 海光寺
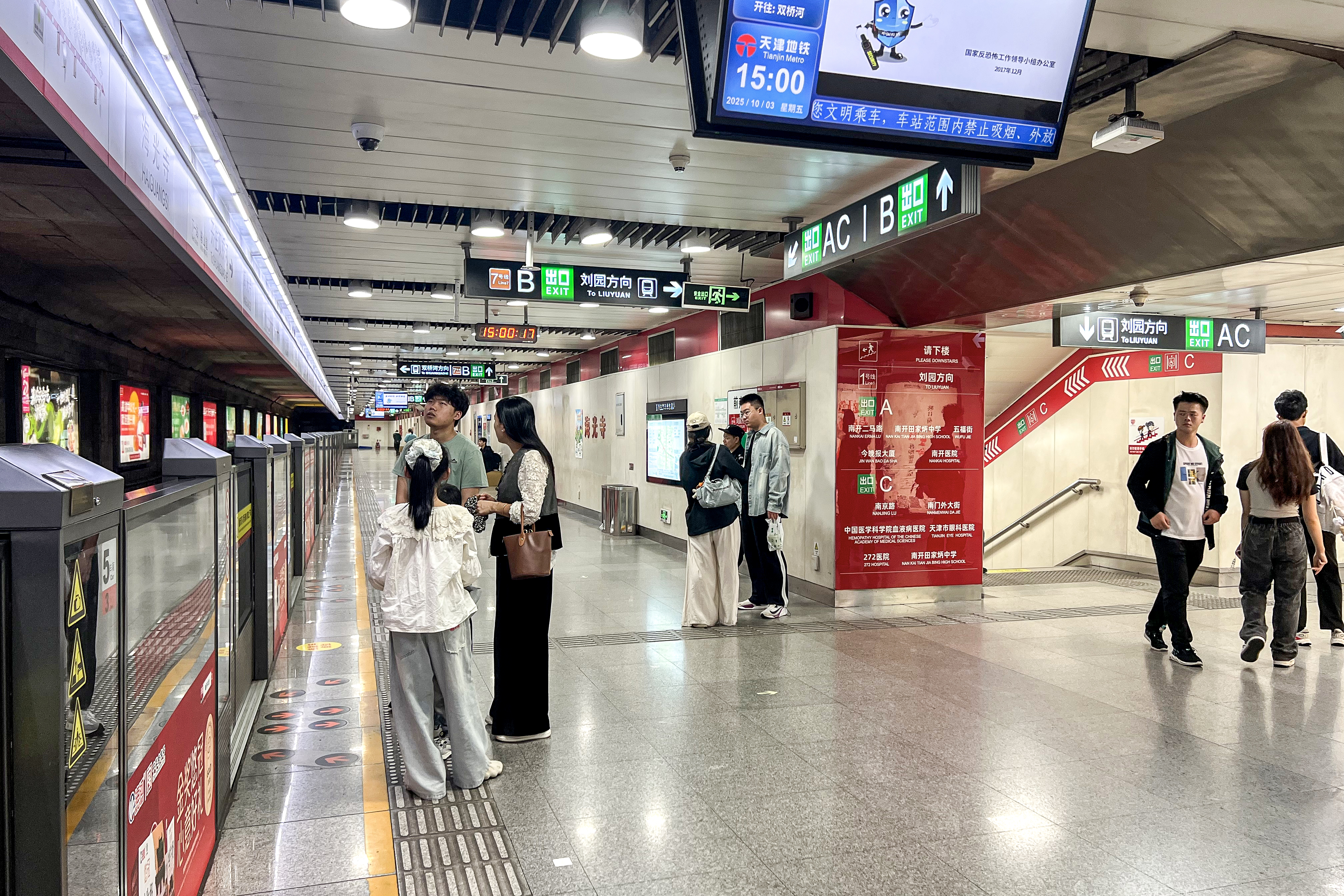
- Line 1 platform

General information
- Other names: Haiguang Temple
- Location: Nankai District, Tianjin; China
- Operated by: Tianjin Metro Co. Ltd.
- Lines: Line 1; Line 7

Construction
- Structure type: Underground

History
- Opened: February 1976 (Line 1); 28 September 2025 (Line 7)
- Rebuilt: 12 June 2006 (Line 1)

Services
Preceding station	Tianjin Metro	Following station
Anshandao towards Shuangqiaohe	Line 1	Erweilu towards Liuyuan
Fuandajie towards Gulou	Line 7	Tianjindaxueliulitai towards Saidalu
Location

Haiguangsi Station (Chinese: 海光寺站), literally Haiguang Temple Station in English, is a station of Line 1 and Line 7 of the Tianjin Metro. It was part of the original metro line from 1984 to 2001, and was rebuilt as part of Line 1 in 2006.

== History ==
Haiguangsi was part of the original metro line, which operated in regular service from 1984 until 2001: it opened for intermittent trial operations in February 1976, with full service starting on 28 December 1984. It was later temporarily closed with the original line on 9 October 2001, and reopened as part of Line 1 on 12 June 2006.
