= Anshandao station =

Metro station in Tianjin, China

Coordinates: 39°07′09″N 117°10′51″E

Anshandao 鞍山道
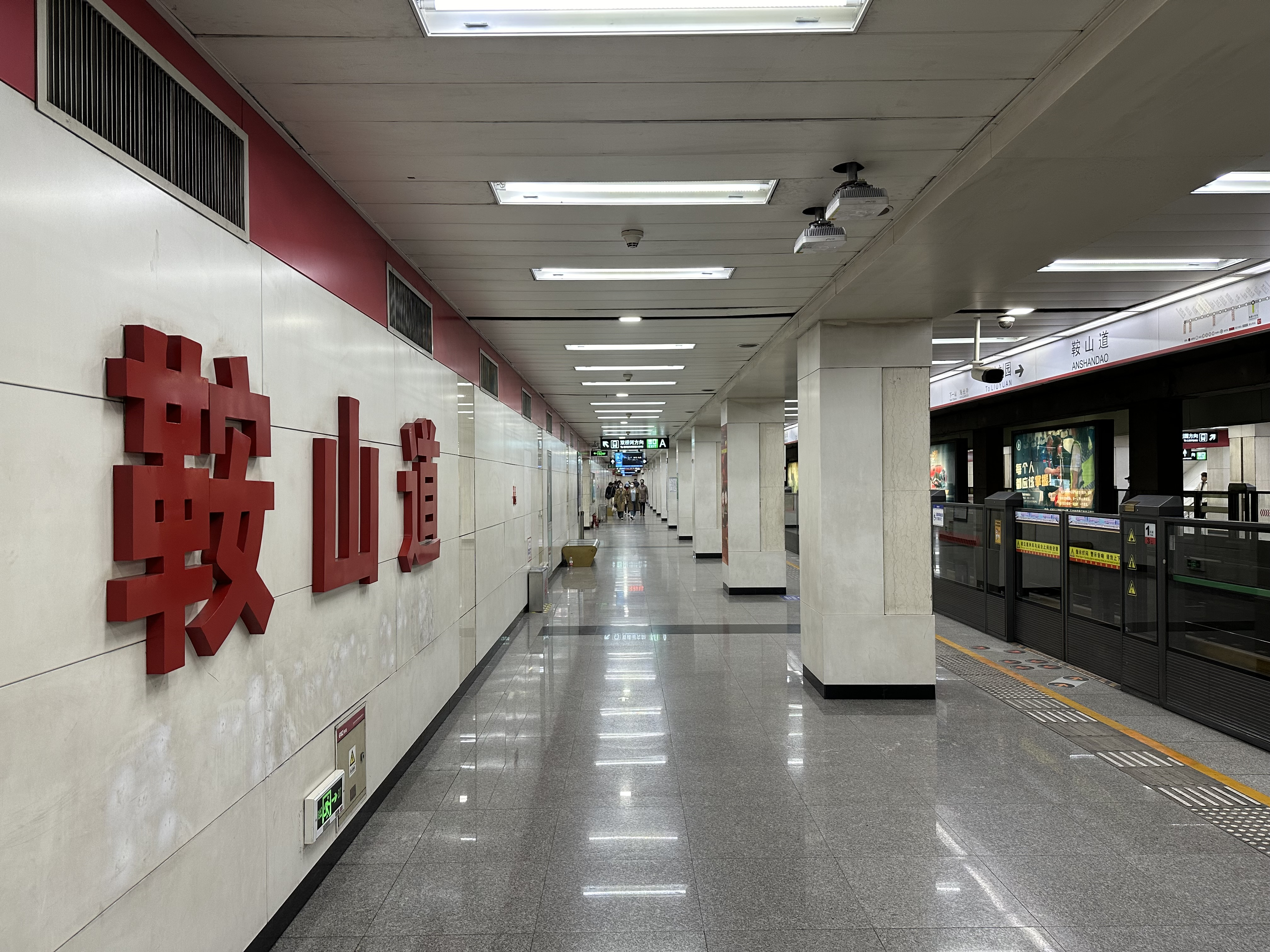

General information
- Other names: Anshan Road
- Location: Heping District, Tianjin; China
- Operated by: Tianjin Metro Co. Ltd.
- Line: Line 1

Construction
- Structure type: Underground

History
- Opened: February 1976
- Rebuilt: 12 June 2006

Services
Preceding station	Tianjin Metro	Following station
Yingkoudao towards Shuangqiaohe	Line 1	Haiguangsi towards Liuyuan
Location

Anshandao Station (Chinese: 鞍山道站), literally Anshan Road Station in English, is a station of Line 1 of the Tianjin Metro. It was part of the original metro line from 1984 to 2001, and was rebuilt as part of Line 1 in 2006.

== History ==
Anshandao was part of the original metro line, which operated in regular service from 1984 until 2001: it opened for intermittent trial operations in February 1976, with full service starting on 28 December 1984. It was later temporarily closed with the original line on 9 October 2001, and reopened as part of Line 1 on 12 June 2006.
