= Ruijingxinyuan station =

Metro station in Tianjin, China

Coordinates: 39°11′56″N 117°06′55″E

Ruijingxinyuan 瑞景新苑
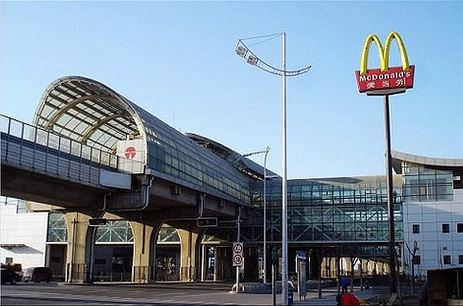

General information
- Location: Beichen District, Tianjin; China
- Operator: Tianjin Metro Co. Ltd.
- Line: Line 1

Construction
- Structure type: Underground and Elevated

History
- Opened: 12 June 2006

Services
| Preceding station | Tianjin Metro | Following station |
|---|---|---|
| Jiayuanli towards Shuangqiaohe | Line 1 | Liuyuan Terminus |
Location

Ruijingxinyuan Station (Chinese: 瑞景新苑站), formerly Xihengdi Station (Chinese: 西横堤站), is a station of Line 1 of the Tianjin Metro. It started operations on 12 June 2006.
