= Tianjin University of Technology and Education =

Municipal public vocational university in Tianjin, China

The Tianjin University of Technology and Education (TUTE; 天津职业技术师范大学; lit. 'Tianjin Vocational and Technical Normal University') is a municipal public vocational university in Hexi, Tianjin, China. It is affiliated with the City of Tianjin, and co-sponsored by the Tianjin Municipal People's Government, the Ministry of Education, and the Ministry of Human Resources and Social Security.

== History ==
In February 1979, in order to meet the needs of teachers in the development of technical education, the Central People's Government established the "Tianjin Technical Teachers College" (天津技工师范学院) based on the "Tianjin Labor Bureau Technical School" (天津市劳动局技工学校) and "Tianjin Fifth Machine Tool Factory" (天津市第五机床厂). The school was placed under the State General Administration of Labor (国家劳动总局).

In October 1983, the school was renamed "Tianjin Vocational and Technical Teachers College" (天津职业技术师范学院) with the approval of the Ministry of Labor and Human Resources.

In February 2000, with the approval of the General Office of the State Council, the school was transferred from the central government sponsorship to the central and local co-sponsorship, with main management responsibility in the City of Tianjin.

In May 2004, the school was renamed "Tianjin Engineering Teachers College" (天津工程师范学院) with the approval of the Ministry of Education.

In March 2010, the school was approved by the Ministry of Education to be renamed "Tianjin Vocational and Technical Normal University" (天津职业技术师范大学).

=== International education ===
In 1993, TUTE began to recruit foreign students. In 2006, TUTE was allowed to enroll students with Chinese Government Scholarship. There were also "Principal Scholarship" to reward excellent overseas students.

In 2008, TUTE established its International School. In charge of the enrollment, cultivation, and management of overseas students. It became one of the fastest growing schools in Tianjin for overseas students. During the past few years, TUTE has also cooperated with schools from the United States, Japan, South Korea, Britain, and Australia.
