= Shenzhen Development Bank =

- Company type: public
- Traded as: SZSE: 000001
- Industry: Financial services
- Founded: 22 December 1987
- Defunct: 2012
- Fate: reserve merger with Ping An Bank
- Successor: Ping An Bank
- Headquarters: Shenzhen, China
- Area served: China
- Key people: Xiao Suining (Chairman); Richard Jackson (President)
- Services: Retail and corporate banking
- Owner: Ping An Insurance (52.38%)
- Parent: Ping An Insurance
- Website: sdb.com.cn

Shenzhen Development Bank Co., Ltd.
- Simplified Chinese: 深圳发展银行股份有限公司
- Traditional Chinese: 深圳發展銀行股份有限公司
Transcriptions
Standard Mandarin
- Hanyu Pinyin: Shēnzhèn Fāzhǎn Yínháng Gǔfèn yǒuxiàn gōngsī

Shenzhen Development Bank
- Simplified Chinese: 深圳发展银行
- Traditional Chinese: 深圳發展銀行
Transcriptions
Standard Mandarin
- Hanyu Pinyin: Shēnzhèn Fāzhǎn Yínháng

Shenzhen Development Bank Co., Ltd. was a bank based in Shenzhen, Guangdong, China, listed on the Shenzhen Stock Exchange.

Ping An Insurance bought the controlling stake in Shenzhen Development Bank in 2011, from Newbridge Capital (16.76%) and from the general public, as well as subscribing new share by injecting Ping An Bank into Shenzhen Development Bank as its subsidiary.

In 2012, the bank was reserved merger with Ping An Bank.
