= Yingkoudao station =

Metro station in Tianjin, China

Coordinates: 39°07′03″N 117°11′29″E

Yingkoudao 营口道
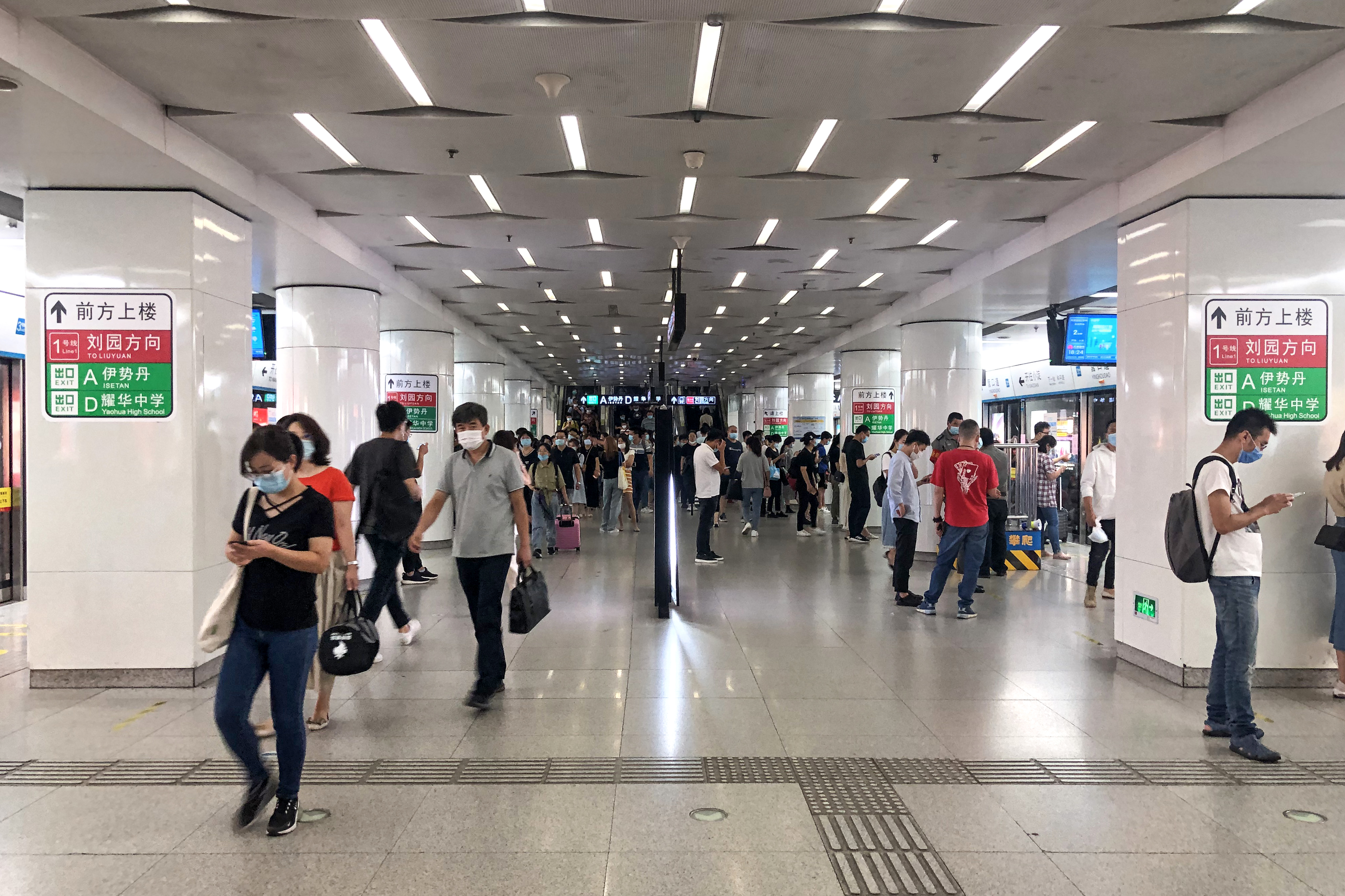
- Line 3 platform

General information
- Other names: Yingkou Road
- Location: Heping District, Tianjin; China
- Operated by: Tianjin Metro Co. Ltd.
- Lines: Line 1; Line 3

Construction
- Structure type: Underground

History
- Opened: February 1976 (Line 1); 1 October 2012 (Line 3)
- Rebuilt: 12 June 2006 (Line 1)

Services
Preceding station	Tianjin Metro	Following station
Xiaobailou towards Shuangqiaohe	Line 1	Anshandao towards Liuyuan
Xikanglu towards Nanzhan	Line 3	Hepinglu towards Xiaodian
Location

Yingkoudao Station (Chinese: 营口道站), literally Yingkou Road Station in English, is a station of Line 1 and Line 3 of the Tianjin Metro. It was part of the original metro line from 1984 to 2001, and was rebuilt as part of Line 1 in 2006.

== History ==
Yingkoudao was part of the original metro line, which operated in regular service from 1984 until 2001: it opened for intermittent trial operations in February 1976, with full service starting on 28 December 1984. It was later temporarily closed with the original line on 9 October 2001, and reopened as part of Line 1 on 12 June 2006.

== Usage ==
In 2015, Yingkoudao was the busiest station in the network with over 100,000 users each day, peaking at 210,000 passengers. Due to the old Line 1 platforms not being built with anticipation of additional interchange traffic the station is extremely crowded. Tianjin Metro is currently planning to renovate and expand the station to better cope with the demand.
