= Tucheng station (Tianjin Metro) =

Tianjin Metro station

Coordinates: 39°05′18″N 117°13′34″E

Tucheng 土城
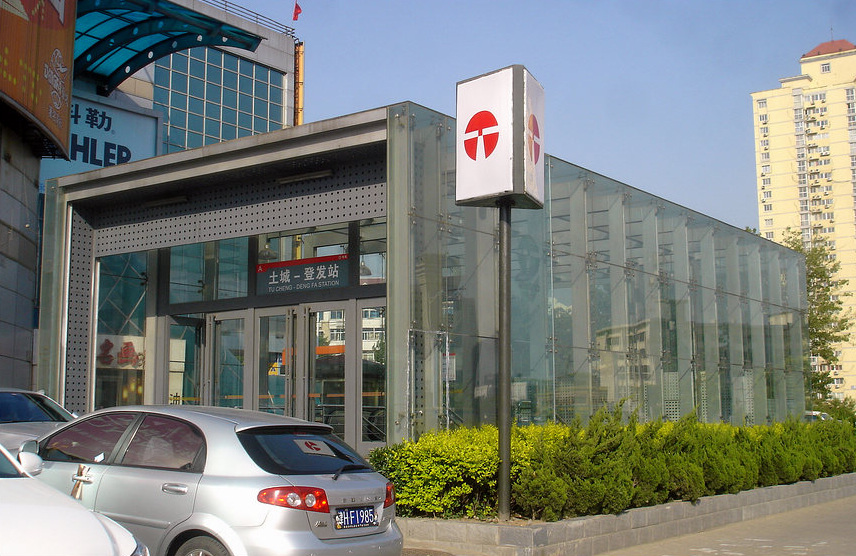

General information
- Location: Hexi District, Tianjin; China
- Operated by: Tianjin Metro Co. Ltd.
- Line(s): Line 1

Construction
- Structure type: Underground and Elevated

History
- Opened: 12 June 2006

Services
| Preceding station | Tianjin Metro | Following station |
|---|---|---|
| Chentangzhuang towards Shuangqiaohe | Line 1 | Nanlou towards Liuyuan |

Tucheng Station (Chinese: 土城站) is a station of Line 1 of the Tianjin Metro. It started operations on 12 June 2006.
