= Xikanglu station =

Metro station in Tianjin, China

Xikanglu 西康路
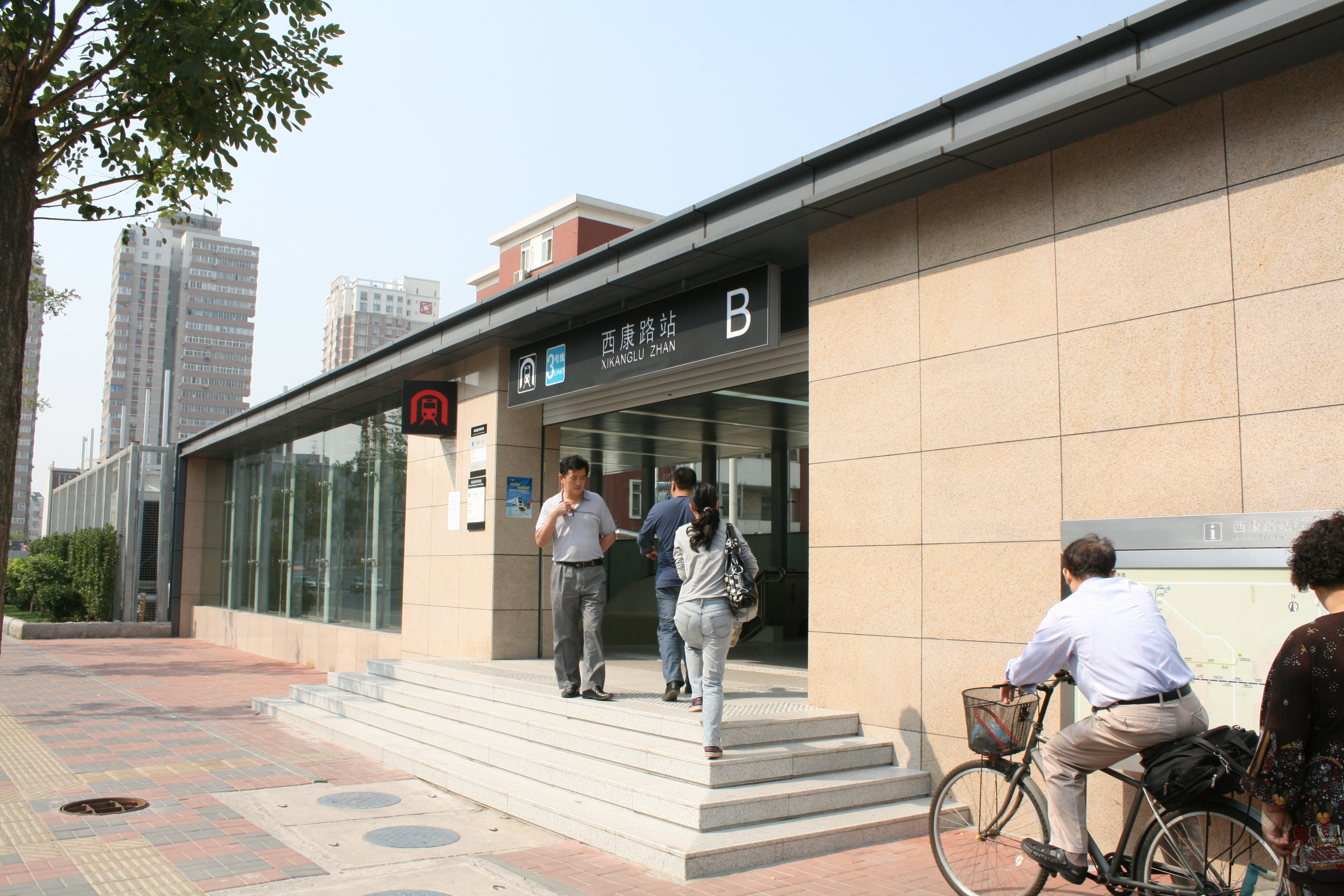

General information
- Other names: Xikang Road
- Location: Heping District, Tianjin; China
- Coordinates: 39.1103643°N 117.1801635°E
- Operator: Tianjin Metro Co. Ltd.
- Line: Line 3

Construction
- Structure type: Underground

History
- Opened: 1 October 2012

Services
Preceding station	Tianjin Metro	Following station
Wujiayao towards Nanzhan	Line 3	Yingkoudao towards Xiaodian
Location

Xikanglu Station (Chinese: 西康路站), literally Xikang Road Station in English, is a station of Line 3 of the Tianjin Metro. It started operations on 1 October 2012.
