= Liuyuan station =

Metro station in Tianjin, China

Coordinates: 39°12′23″N 117°06′34″E

Liuyuan 刘园
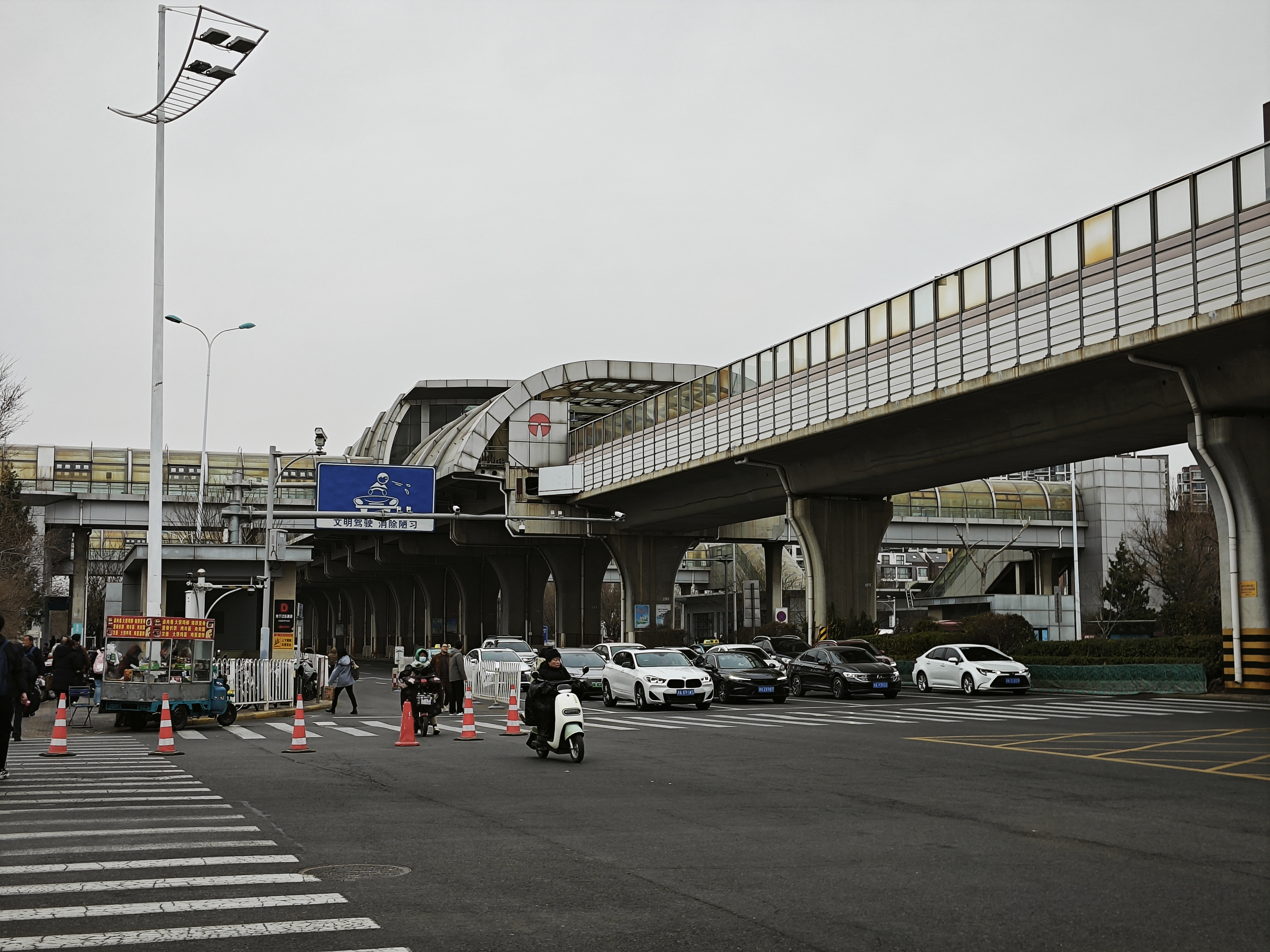

General information
- Location: Beichen District, Tianjin; China
- Operator: Tianjin Metro Co. Ltd.
- Line: Line 1

Construction
- Structure type: Underground and Elevated

History
- Opened: 12 June 2006

Services
Preceding station	Tianjin Metro	Following station
Xihengdi towards Shuangqiaohe	Line 1	Terminus
Location

Liuyuan Station (Chinese: 刘园站) is a station of Line 1 of the Tianjin Metro. It started operations on 12 June 2006.
