= Jianshan Subdistrict, Tianjin =

Jianshan Subdistrict 尖山街道
- Subdistrict
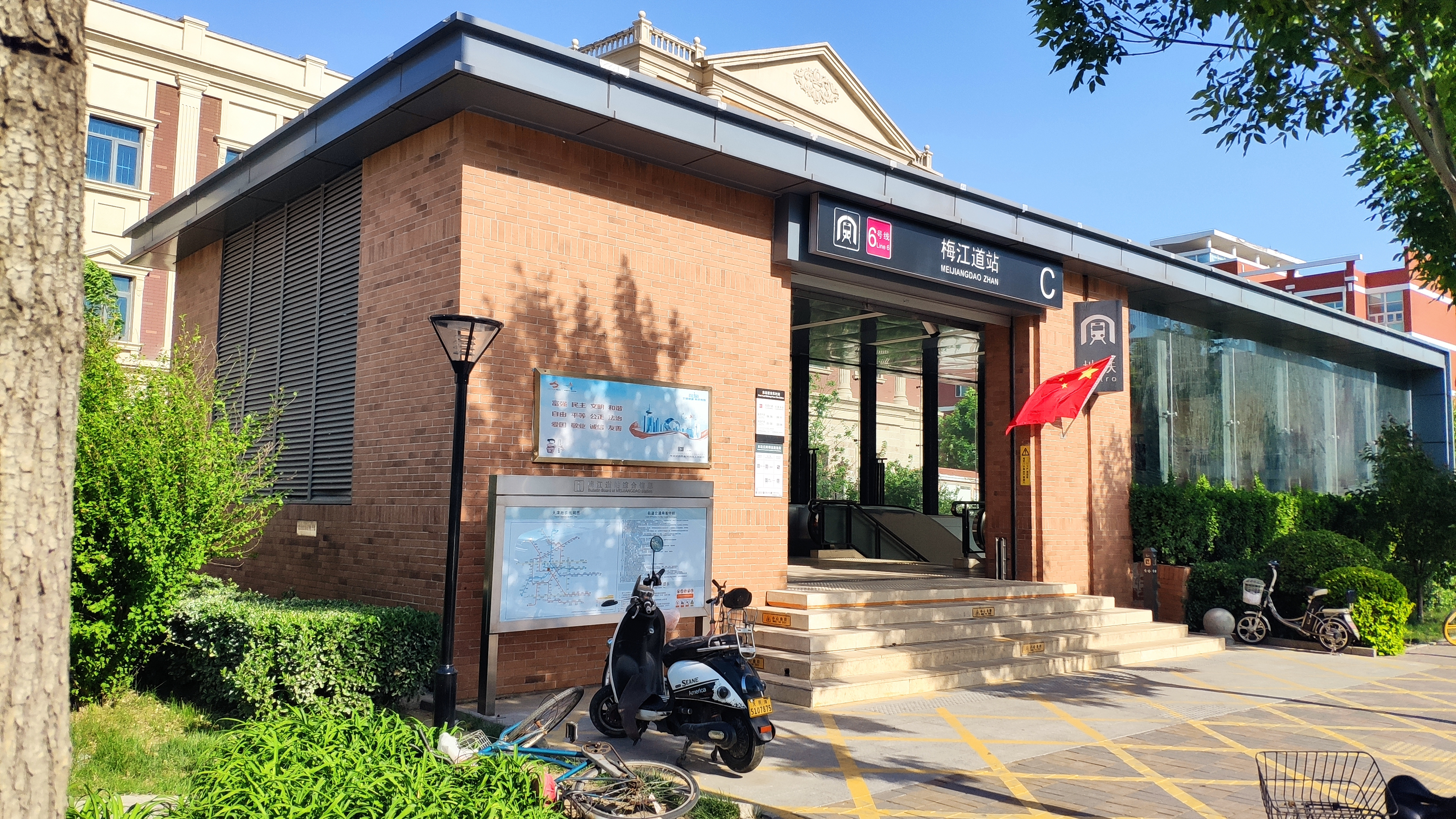
- Meijiangdao Station on the western border of the subdistrict, 2022

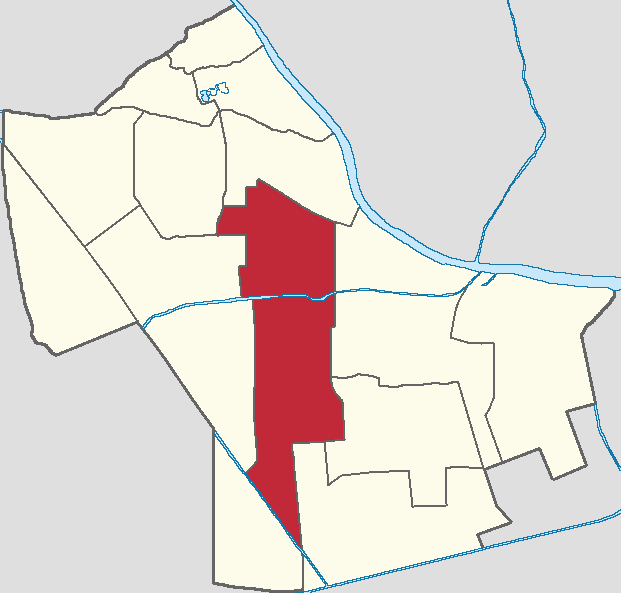
- Location within Hexi District

- Location within Tianjin Location within China
- Coordinates: 39°05′17″N 117°13′25″E
- Country: China
- Municipality: Tianjin
- District: Hexi
- Village-level Divisions: 13 communities

Area
  - Total: 5.71 km^{2} (2.20 sq mi)
- Elevation: 7 m (23 ft)

Population (2010)
  - Total: 91,767
  - Density: 16,100/km^{2} (41,600/sq mi)
- Time zone: UTC+8 (China Standard)
- Postal code: 300221
- Area code: 022

Jianshan Subdistrict (Chinese: 尖山街道; pinyin: Jiānshān Jiēdào) is a subdistrict located on the center of Hexi District, Tianjin, China. It borders Yuexiu Road and Guajiasi Subdistricts in its north, Chentangzhuang and Donghai Subdistricts in its east, Taihu Road and Meijiang Subdistricts in its south, and Youyi Road Subdistrict in its west. In the year 2010, 91,767 inhabitants were counted for this subdistrict.

The name Jianshan (Chinese: 尖山; lit. 'Pointy Mountain') came from two villages that used to exist within the region during the Ming and Qing dynasties, both of which were situated on top of a hill compared to the low-lying landscape of their surrounding.

== Geography ==
Jianshan Subdistrict is bisected by Fuxing River that runs eastward to flow into the Hai River. Jiefang South Road and Dongnan Banhuan Expressway pass through here.

== History ==
Timetable of Jianshan Subdistrict
Year	Status	Under
1954 - 1956	Nanlou Subdistrict Tuchengjie Subdistrict	6th District, Tianjin
1956 - 1960	Nanlou Subdistrict Tuchengjie Subdistrict	Hexi District
1960 - 1963	Administered by Chentangzhuang People's Commune	Hexi District
1963–present	Jianshan Subdistrict	Hexi District

== Administrative divisions ==
As of 2021, Jianshan Subdistrict administered the following 13 residential communities:

Subdivision names	Name transliterations
郁江南里	Yujiang Nanli
曙光里	Shuguangli
光明里	Guangmingli
红山里	Hongshanli
纯洁里	Chunjieli
长达公寓	Changda Gongyu
光华里	Guanghuali
名都新园	Mingdu Xinyuan
瑞江花园	Ruijiang Huayuan
尚城	Shangcheng
水晶城	Shuijing Cheng
优仕公寓	Youshi Gongyu
喜年广场	Xinian Guangchang
