= Taoyuan Subdistrict, Tianjin =

Taoyuan Subdistrict 桃园街道
- Subdistrict
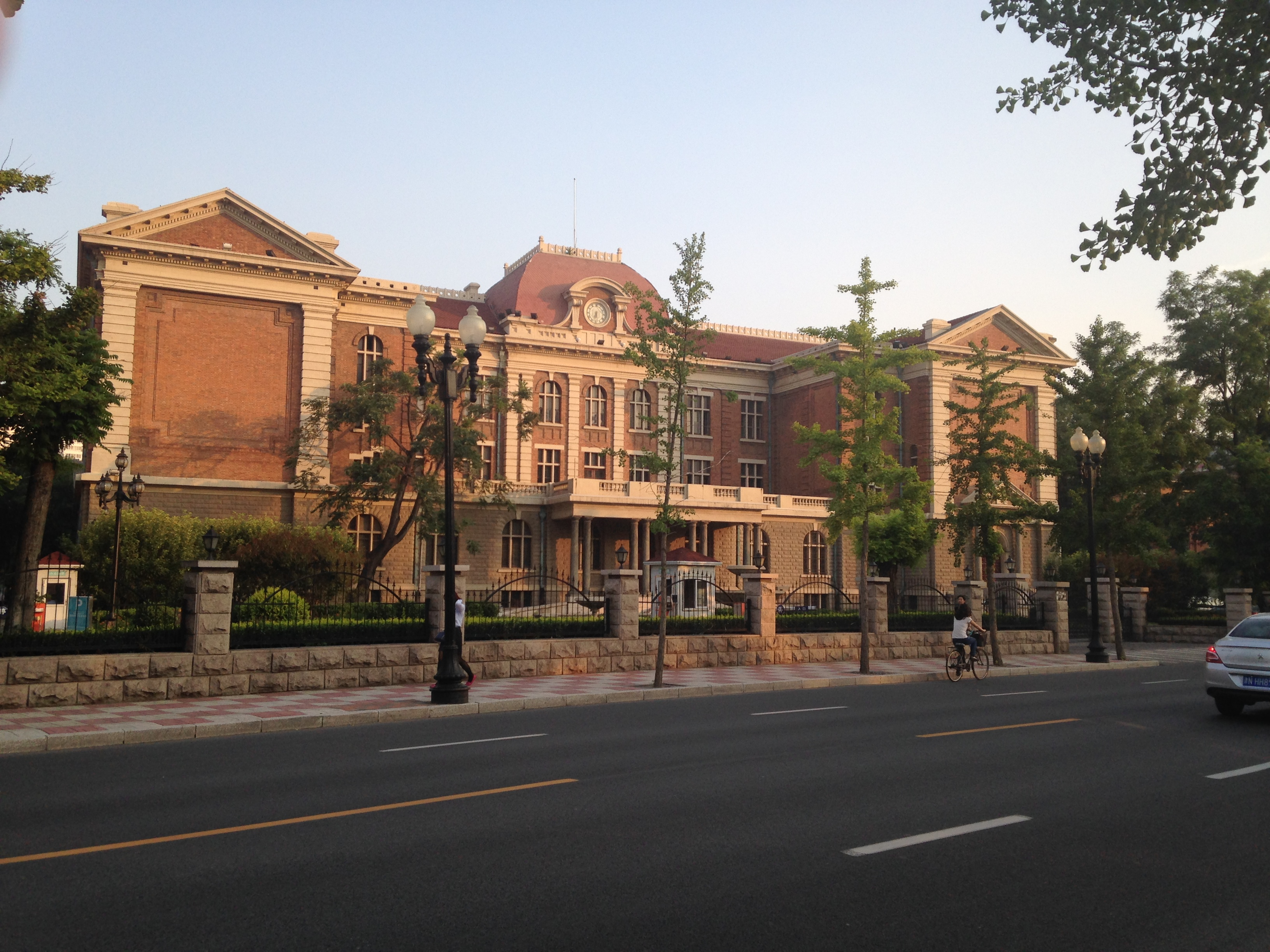
- Former site of Tientsin Kung Shang College, 2014

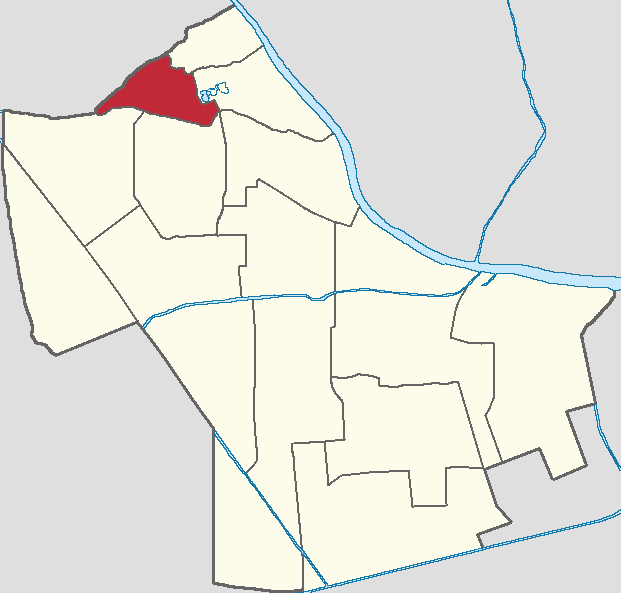
- Location of Taoyuan Subdistrict within Hexi District

- Location within Tianjin Location within China
- Coordinates: 39°06′32″N 117°12′15″E
- Country: China
- Municipality: Tianjin
- District: Hexi
- Village-level Divisions: 8 communities

Area
  - Total: 1.4 km^{2} (0.54 sq mi)
- Elevation: 8 m (26 ft)

Population (2010)
  - Total: 51,061
  - Density: 36,000/km^{2} (94,000/sq mi)
- Time zone: UTC+8 (China Standard)
- Postal code: 300202
- Area code: 022

Taoyuan Subdistrict (simplified Chinese: 桃园街道; traditional Chinese: 桃園街道; pinyin: Táoyuán Jiēdào) is a subdistrict in the northwest of Hexi District, Tianjin. It is located at the southwest of Dayingmen and Xiawafang Subdistricts, north of Yuexiu Road and Machang Subdistricts, and southeast of Xinxing and Wudadao Subdistricts. As of 2010, the population of Taoyuan Subdistrict was 51,061.

The subdistrict was named after Taoyuan (Chinese: 桃园; lit. 'Peach Orchard') Village that used to exist in the region.

== History ==
Timeline of Taoyuan Subdistrict
Year	Status	Part of
1954 - 1956	Taoyuancun Subdistrict Qiandezhuang Subdistrict	6th District, Tianjin
1956 - 1958	Taoyuancun Subdistrict Qiandezhuang Subdistrict	Hexi District, Tianjin
1958 - 1960	Qiandezhuang Subdistrict	Hexi District, Tianjin
1960 - 1964	Qiandezhuang People's Commune	Hexi District, Tianjin
1964 - 1996	Taoyuancun Subdistrict Qiandezhuang Subdistrict	Hexi District, Tianjin
1996–present	Taoyuan Subdistrict	Hexi District, Tianjin

== Administrative divisions ==
At the time of writing, Taoyuan Subdistrict consisted of 8 communities they are, by the order of their Administrative Division Codes:

Subdivision names	Name transliterations
照耀里	Zhaoyaoli
庆荣里	Qingrongli
西楼北里	Xilou Beili
广顺园	Guangshunyuan
连荣里	Lianrongli
元兴新里	Yuanxing Xinli
津港路	Jinganglu
罗兰花园	Luolan Huayuan

== Landmark ==
- Musée Hoangho Paiho
