= Liulin Subdistrict =

Liulin Subdistrict 柳林街道
- Subdistrict
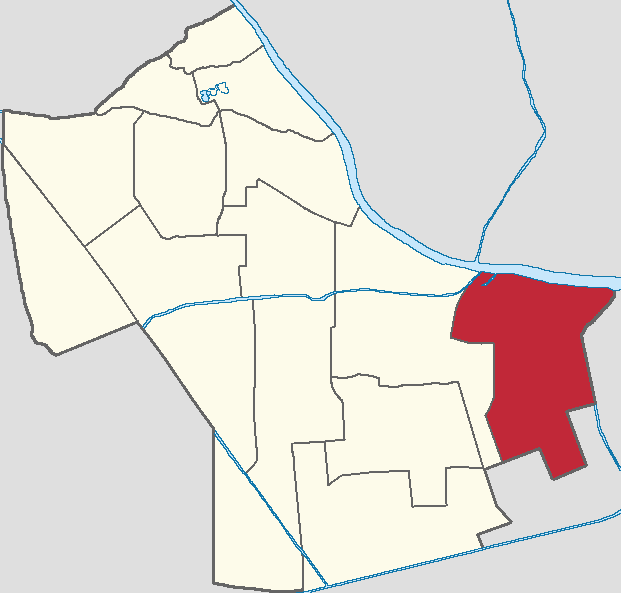
- Location of Liulin Subdistrict within Hexi District

- Location within Tianjin Location within China
- Coordinates: 39°03′55″N 117°15′58″E
- Country: China
- Municipality: Tianjin
- District: Hexi
- Village-level Divisions: 11 communities

Area
  - Total: 4.2 km^{2} (1.6 sq mi)
- Elevation: 6 m (20 ft)

Population (2010)
  - Total: 101,679
  - Density: 24,000/km^{2} (63,000/sq mi)
- Time zone: UTC+8 (China Standard)
- Postal code: 300222
- Area code: 022

Liulin Subdistrict (Chinese: 柳林街道; pinyin: Liǔlín Jiēdào) is a subdistrict on eastern Hexi District, Tianjin, China. It borders Wanxin Subdistrict in the north, Shuanggang Town in the east, Shuanglin Subdistrict in the south, and Chentangzhuang Subdistrict in the west. Its population was 101,679 as of 2010.

The name Liulin (Chinese: 柳林; lit. 'Willow Forest') is referring to the concentration of willows along the bank of Hai River within this region.

== History ==
History of Liulin Subdistrict
| Year | Status | Under |
|---|---|---|
| 1949 - 1952 | Huidui Village Xiahequan Village | |
| 1952 - 1953 | Huidui Village Xiahequan Village | 6th District, Tianjin |
| 1953 - 1954 | Huidui Street | 6th District, Tianjin |
| 1954 - 1956 | Huidui Subdistrict | 6th District, Tianjin |
| 1956 - 1988 | Liulin Subdistrict | Hexi District, Tianjin |
| 1988–present | Liulin Subdistrict | Hexi District, Tianjin |

== Administrative divisions ==
So far in 2021, Liulin Subdistrict is formed from 11 residential communities. They are organized into the following list:

| Subdivision names | Name transliterations |
|---|---|
| 龙天园 | Longtianyuan |
| 微山东里 | Weishan Dongli |
| 腾华里 | Tenghuali |
| 贺福里 | Hefuli |
| 园丁公寓 | Yuanding Gongyu |
| 景雅里 | JIngyali |
| 东海里 | Donghaili |
| 珠峰里 | Zhufengli |
| 金海湾 | Jinhaiwan |
| 龙博花园 | Longbo Huayuan |
| 龙瀚东园 | Longhan Dongyuan |
