= Donghai Subdistrict, Tianjin =

Donghai Subdistrict 东海街道
- Subdistrict
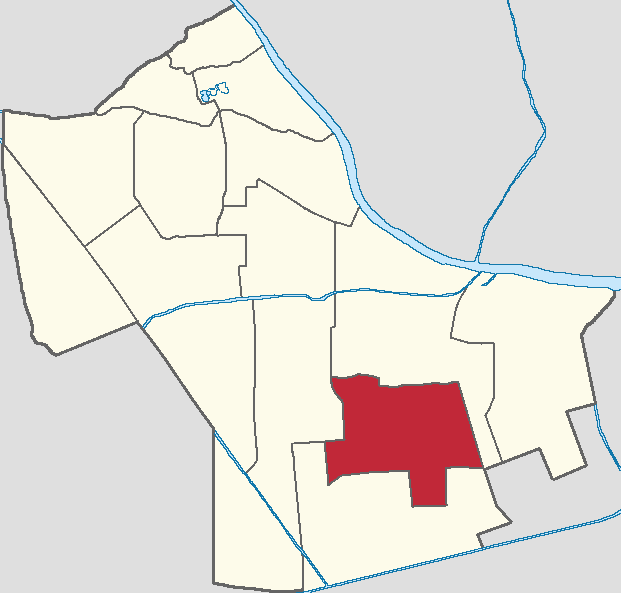
- Location within Hexi District

- Location within Tianjin Location within China
- Coordinates: 39°03′25″N 117°15′01″E
- Country: China
- Municipality: Tianjin
- District: Hexi
- Village-level Divisions: 12 communities

Area
  - Total: 2.12 km^{2} (0.82 sq mi)
- Elevation: 4 m (13 ft)

Population (2010)
  - Total: 80,013
  - Density: 37,700/km^{2} (97,800/sq mi)
- Time zone: UTC+8 (China Standard)
- Postal code: 300223
- Area code: 022

Donghai Subdistrict (simplified Chinese: 东海街道; traditional Chinese: 東海街道; pinyin: Dōnghǎi Jiēdào) is a subdistrict in the southeast corner of Hexi District, Tianjin, China. It shares border with Chentangzhuang Subdistrict in the north and east, Taihu Road Subdistrict in the south, and Jianshan Subdistrict in the west. Its population was 80,013 as of the 2020 census.

The subdistrict's name Donghai literally means "East Sea".

== History ==
Timetable of Donghai Subdistrict
Year	Status	Belong to
1981 - 1992	Zhujiangdao Subdistrict	Hexi District, Tianjin
1992 - 1994	Zhujiangdao Subdistrict Sanshuidao Subdistrict	Hexi District, Tianjin
1994–present	Donghai Subdistrict	Hexi District, Tianjin

== Administrative divisions ==
In 2021, Donghai Subdistrict was divided into 12 residential communities. They are listed as follows:

Subdivision names	Name transliterations
云江新苑	Yunjiang Xinyuan
兰江新苑	Lanjiang Xinyuan
龙江里	Longjiangli
川江里	Chuanjiangli
华江里第一	Huajiangli Diyi
华江里第二	Huajiangli Di'er
松江里	Songjangli
粤江里	Yuejiangli
桂江里	Guijiangli
三水南里	Sanshui Nanli
汉江里	Hanjiangli
儒林园	Rulinyuan
