= Tianta Subdistrict =

Tianta Subdistrict 天塔街道
- Subdistrict
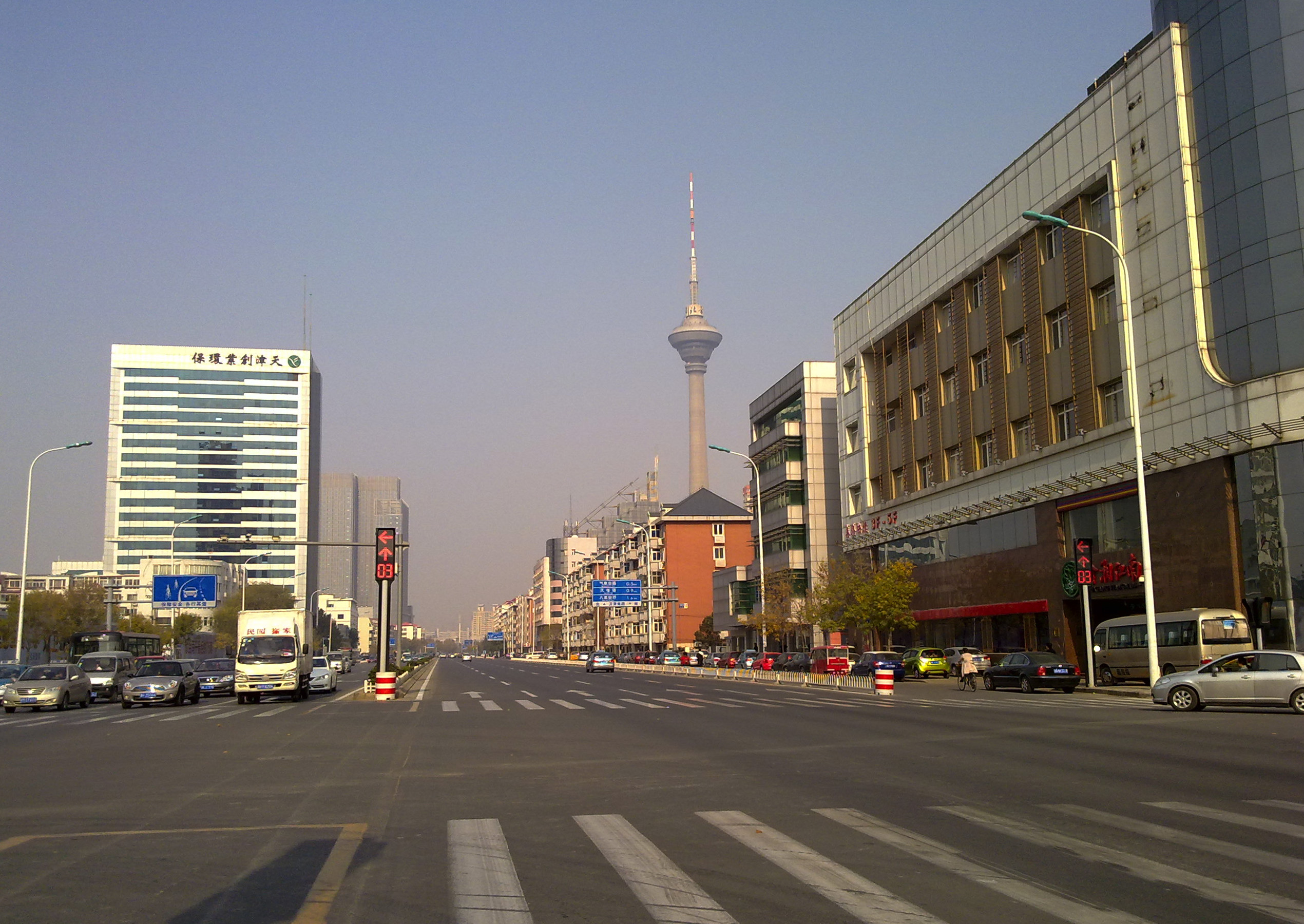
- Intersection of Weijin Road and Xiaguang Avenue inside the subdistrict, 2013

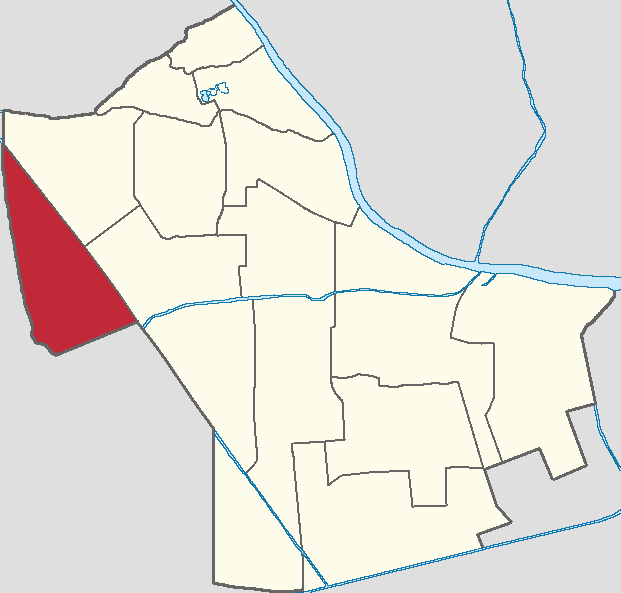
- Location within Hexi District

- Location within Tianjin Location within China
- Coordinates: 39°04′51″N 117°10′51″E
- Country: China
- Municipality: Tianjin
- District: Hexi
- Village-level Divisions: 14 communities

Area
  - Total: 3.28 km^{2} (1.27 sq mi)
- Elevation: 7 m (23 ft)

Population (2010)
  - Total: 83,753
  - Density: 25,500/km^{2} (66,100/sq mi)
- Time zone: UTC+8 (China Standard)
- Postal code: 300060
- Area code: 022

Tianta Subdistrict (Chinese: 天塔街道; pinyin: Tiāntǎ Jiēdào) is a subdistrict within Hexi District, Tianjin, China. It shares border with Machang and Youyi Road Subdistricts to the northeast, Liqizhuang Subdistrict to the south, as well as Shuishang Gongyuan and Tiyu Zhongxin Subdistricts to the west. As of 2010, it had a population of 83,753.

The name Tianta (Chinese: 天塔; lit. 'Tianjin Tower') refers to the Tianjin TV Tower that is situated on the section of Weijin River east of the subdistrict.

== Geography ==
The subdistrict is on the west of Weijin River and north of Fuxing River. Both Weijin South Road and Dongnan Banhuan Expressway run through it.

== History ==
History of Tianta Subdistrict
Year	Status	Within
1984 - 1986	Tiyuguanbei Subdistrict Jizhuangzi Residential District	Hexi District, Tianjin
1986 - 1997	Tiyuguanbei Subdistrict Jizhuangzi Subdistrict	Hexi District, Tianjin
1997 - 2000	Tianta Subdistrict Jizhuangzi Subdistrict	Hexi District, Tianjin
2000–present	Tianta Subdistrict	Hexi District, Tianjin

== Administrative divisions ==
By the end of 2021, Tianta Subdistrict consisted of 14 residential communities. All of them are listed in the table below:

Subdivision names	Name transliterations
环湖南里	Huanhu Nanli
气象南里	Qixiang Nanli
环湖东里	Huanhu Dongli
宾水北里	Binshui Beili
宾水东里	Binshui Dongli
宾水西里	Binshui Xili
宾水南里	Binshui Nanli
育贤里	Yuxianli
高风里	Gaofengli
富源里	Fuyuanli
体育学院	Tiyu Xueyuan
立达博兰	Lida Bolan
五一阳光	Wuyi Yangguang
紫金里	Zijinli

== Gallery ==
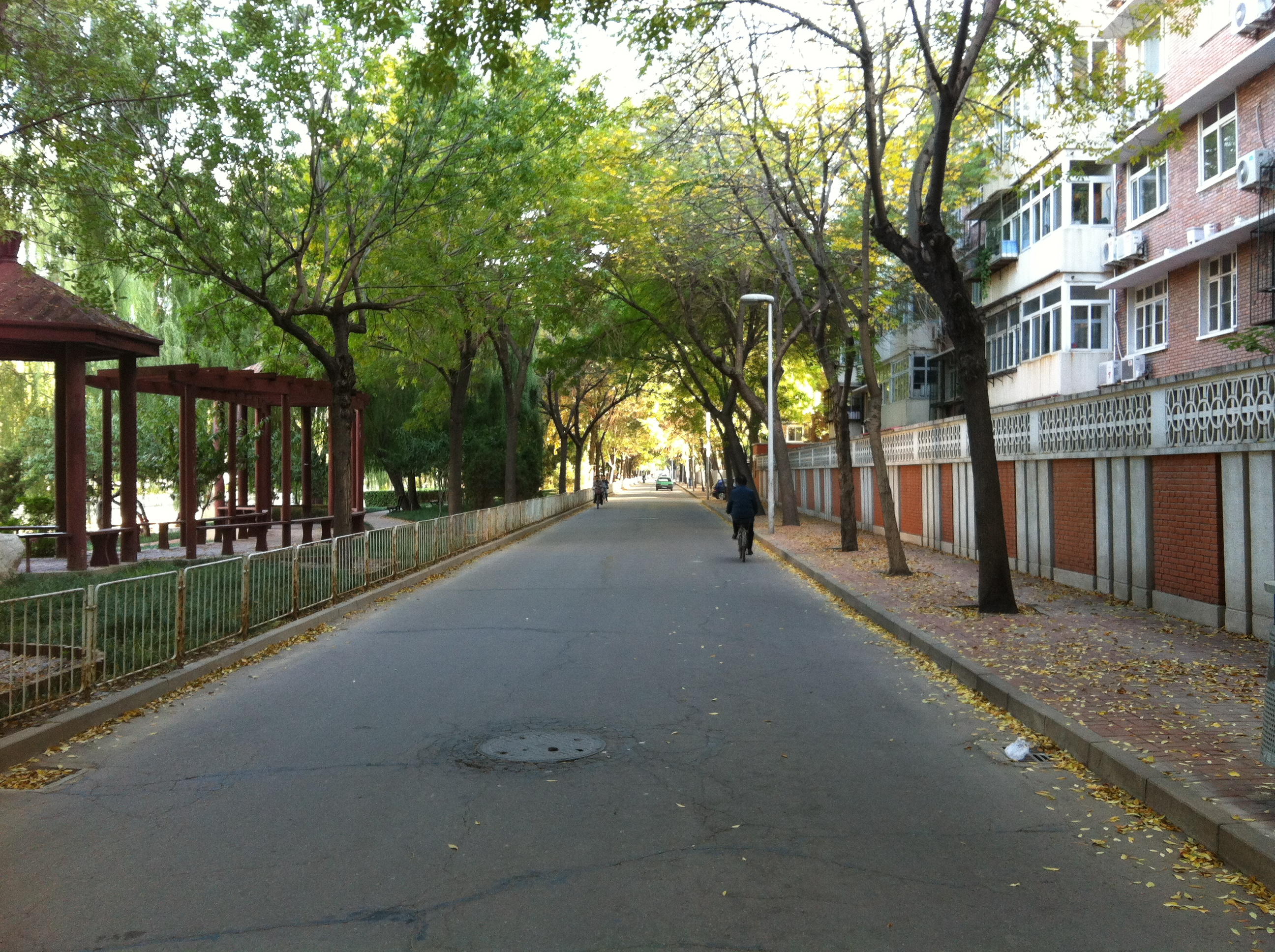
Yanhe Road on the east of the subdistrict, 2011

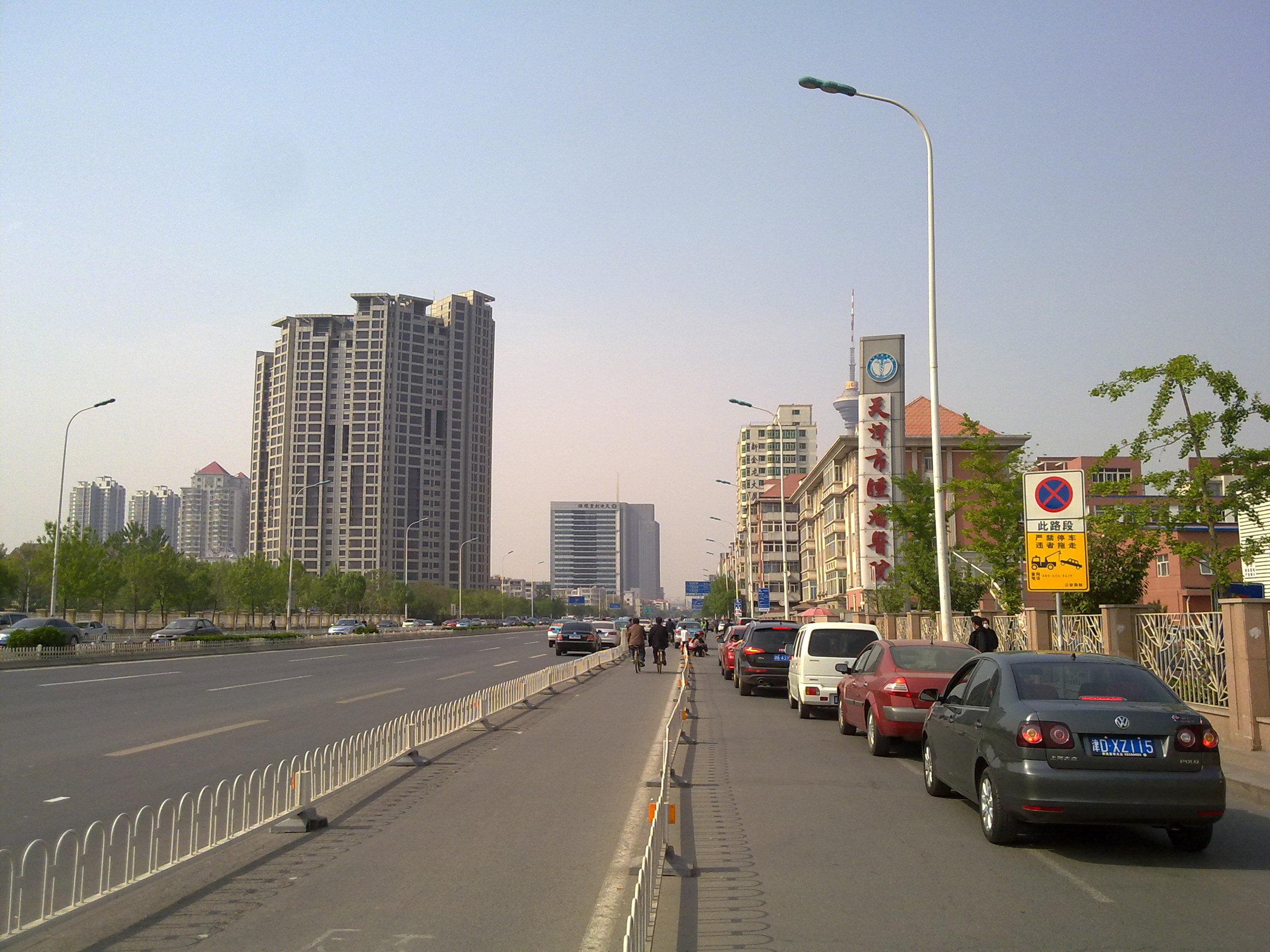
Tianjin Medical University Cancer Institute and Hospital, 2014

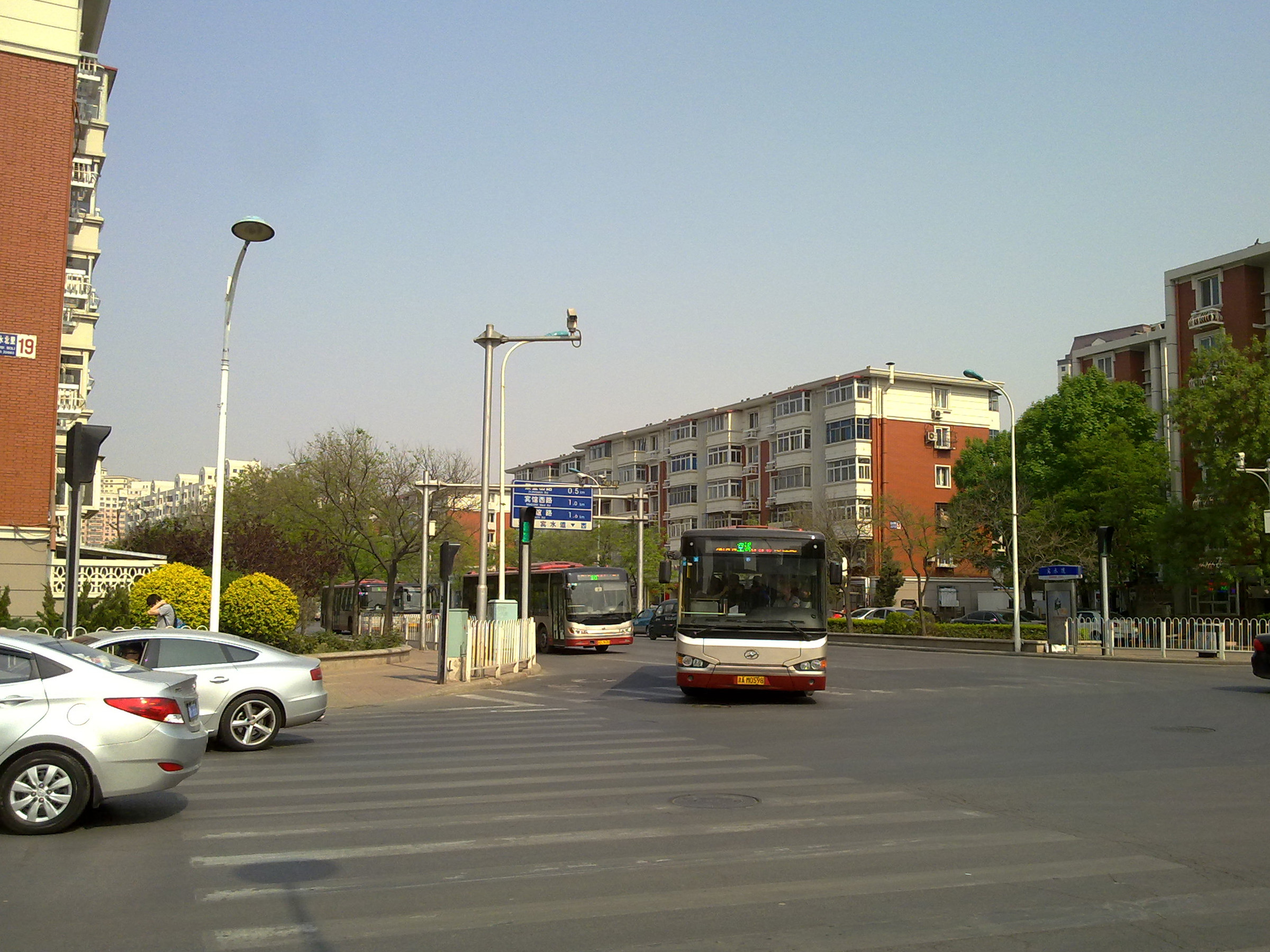
Intersection of Binshui Avenue and Huanhu Middle Road, 2014

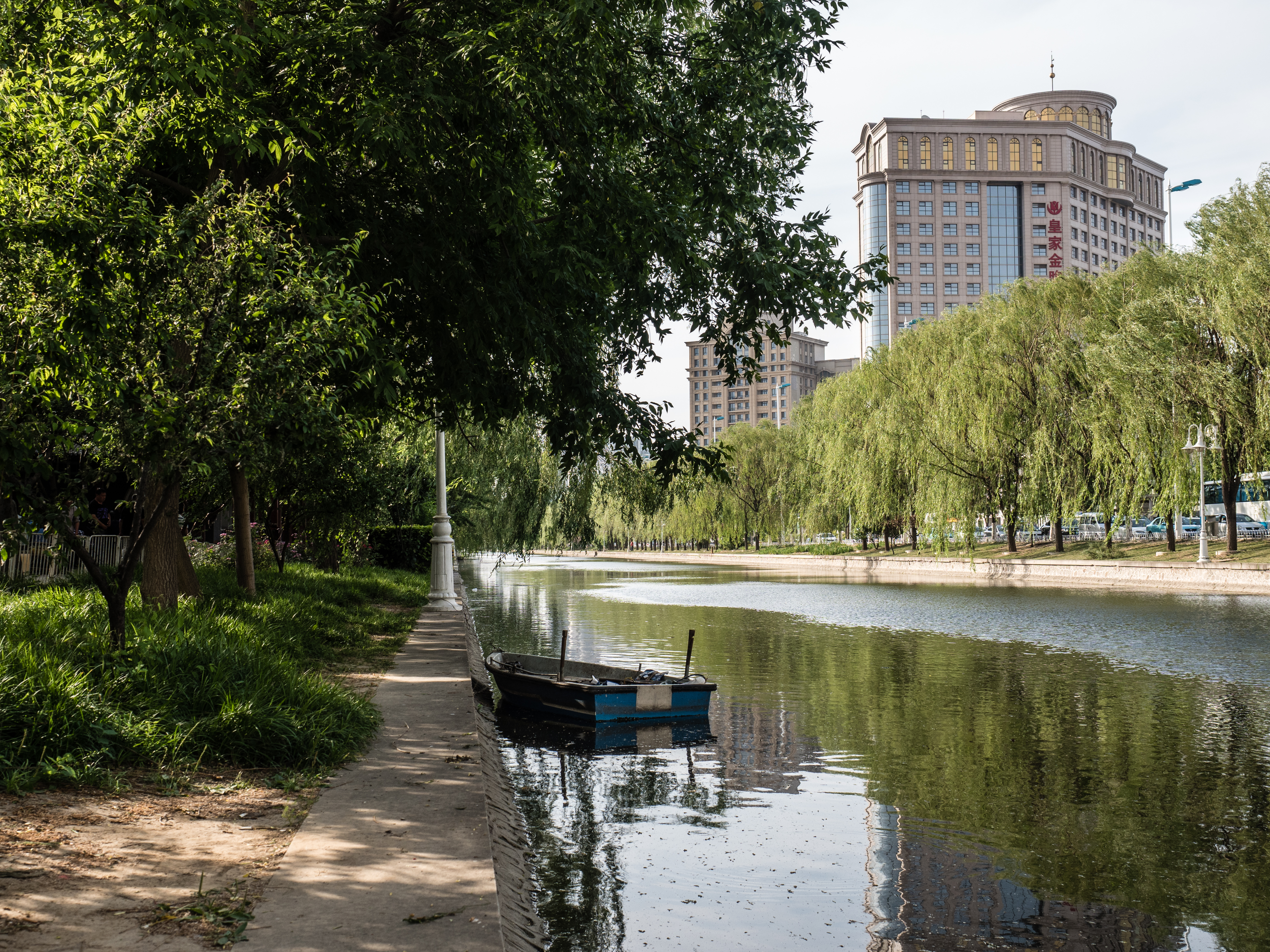
Section of Weijin River, 2015
