= Tianjin Xinhua High School =

High school in Tianjin, China

Tianjin XinHua High School
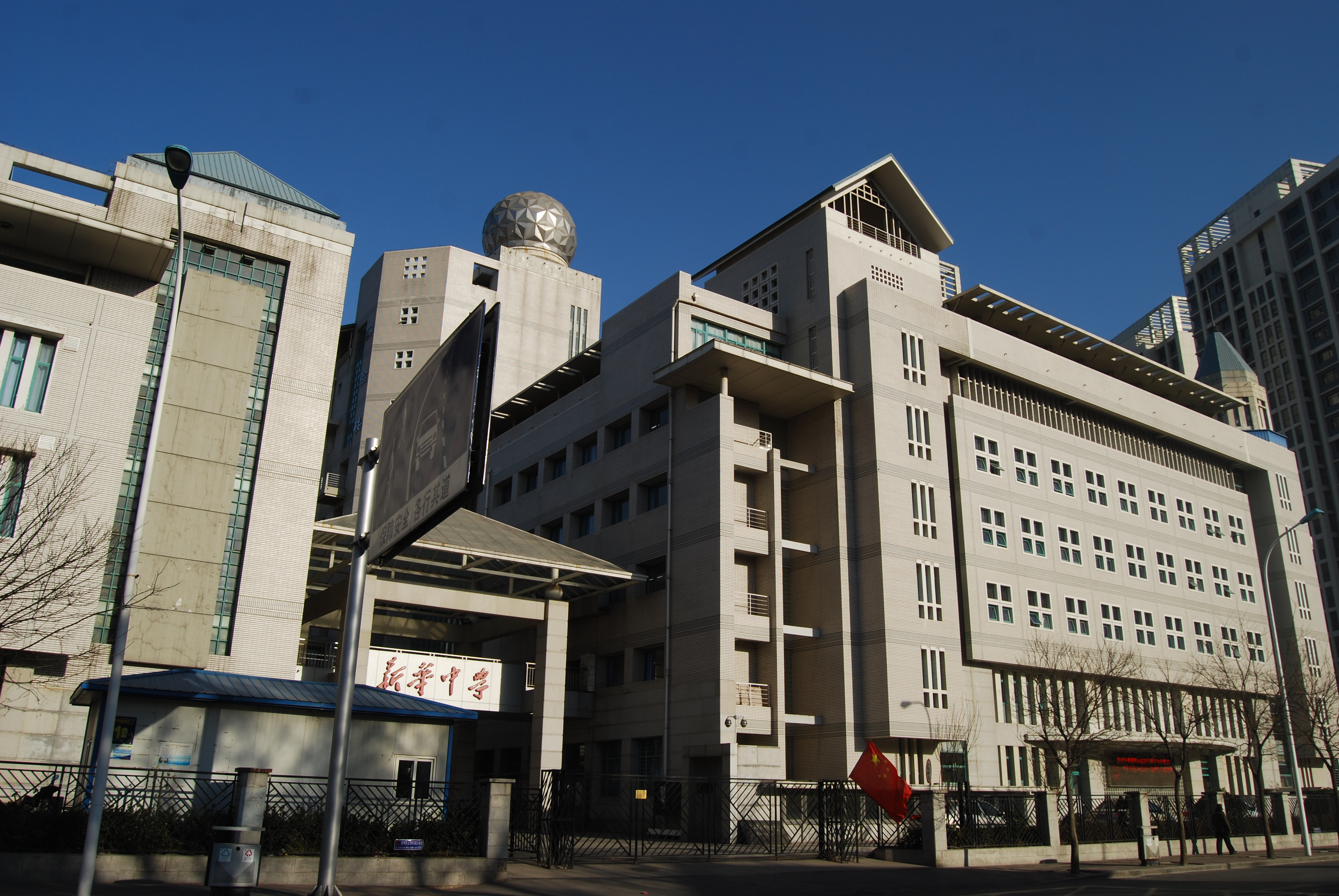

Location
- 99 Machang Road, Hexi, Tianjin

Information
- Other name: 新华中学
- Type: Public
- Established: 1914
- School district: Tianjin
- Principal: Tao Yang
- Website: Homepage

Tianjin Xinhua High School (simplified Chinese: 天津新华中学; traditional Chinese: 天津新華中學) has a long history, was founded in 1914 by Li Luyi, Xia Jingru and others from Catholic Church. It was initially named by "Sheng Gong School" (simplified Chinese: 圣功学堂), and had several times changed its name, among others "Shenggong Girls middle school"(simplified Chinese: 圣功女中), Hebei University secondary school (simplified Chinese: 河北大学附属中). In 1973 it got named by "Tianjin Xinhua middle school". In 1978, the school was notable as one of the first top schools in Tianjin; in 1994, the school was included in the "Chinese top school selection." It got notable as one of the first state-level demonstration high schools. Each year the school received more than 40 honors at all levels.

The school is located in 99 Machang Road, Hexi District, Tianjin, covers an area of 40,000 square meters.
