= Hexi, Tianjin =

Hexi 河西区
- District
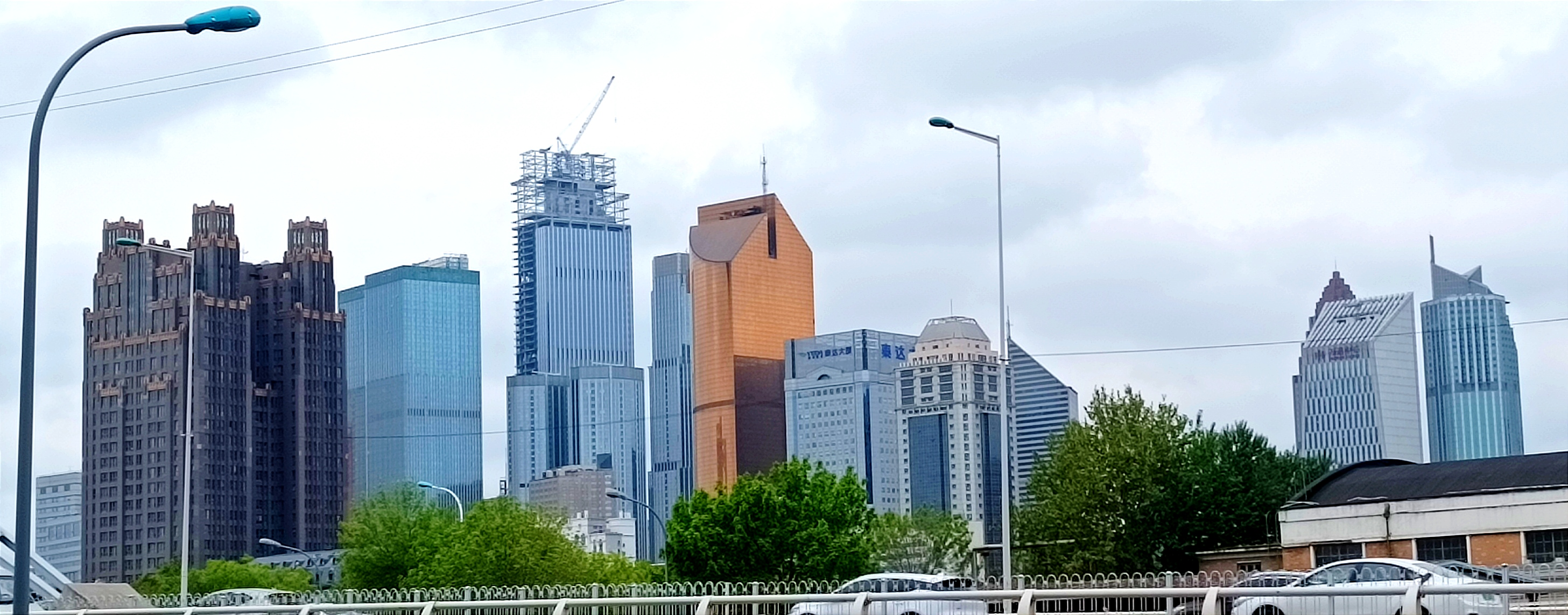
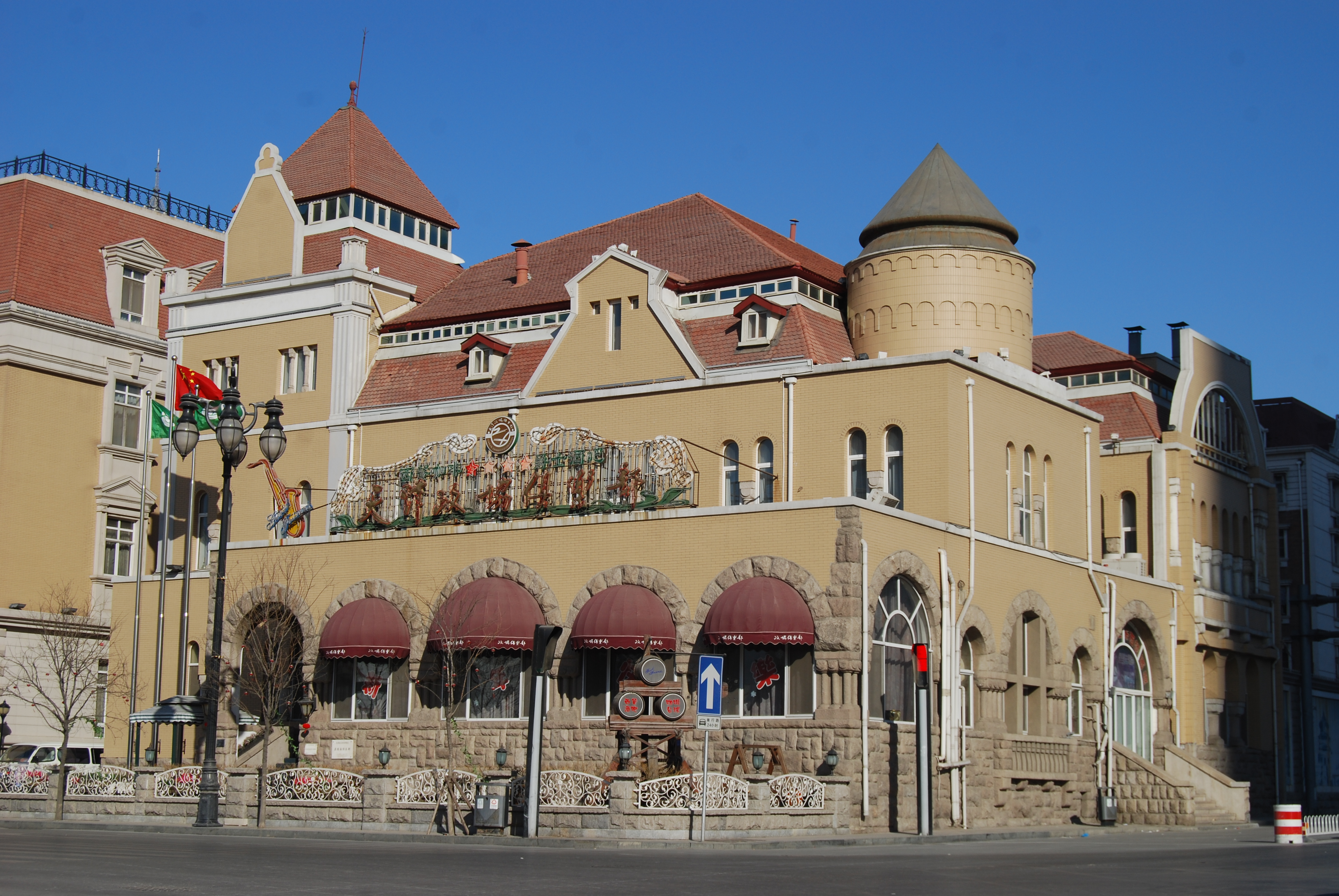
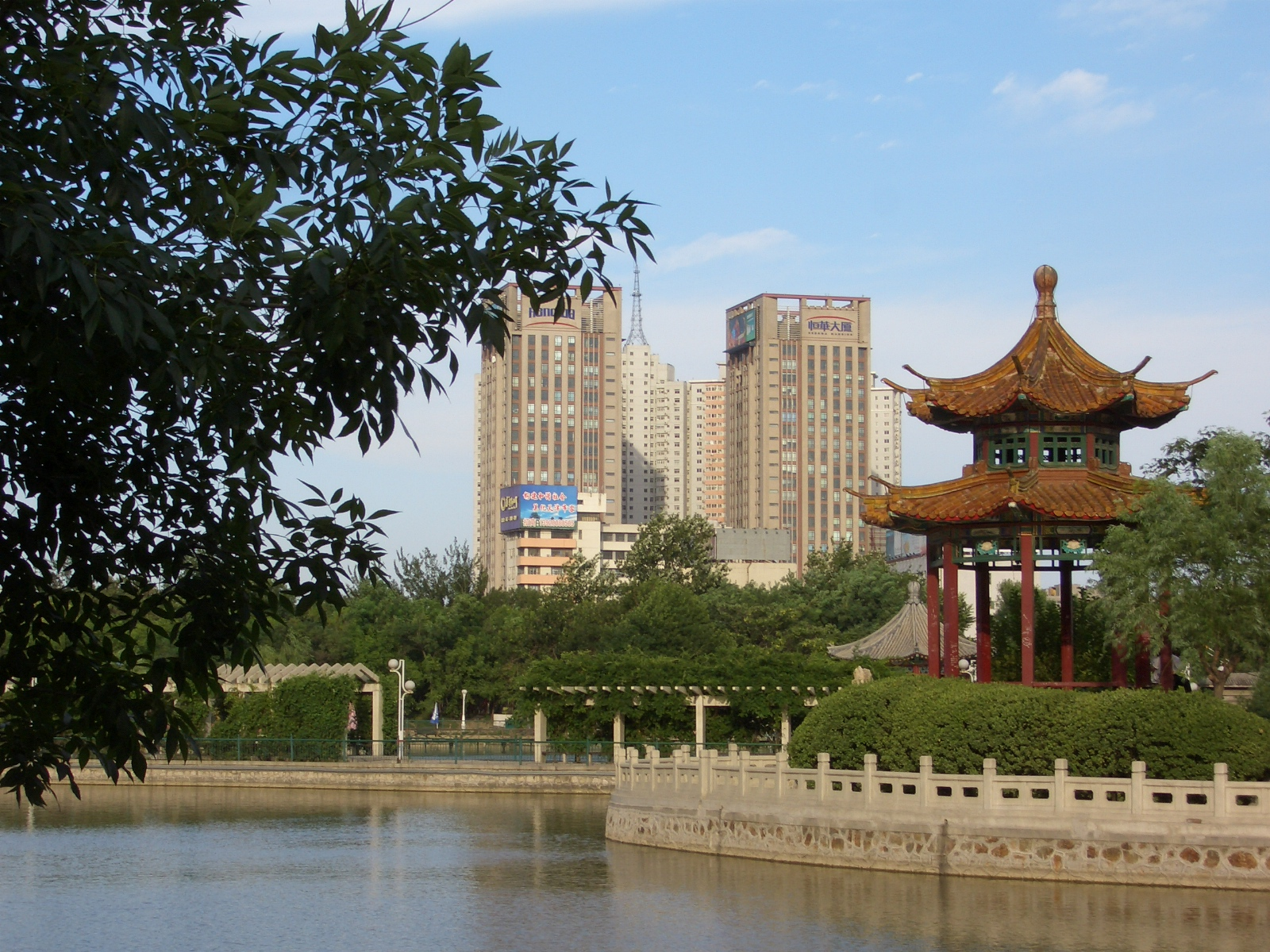
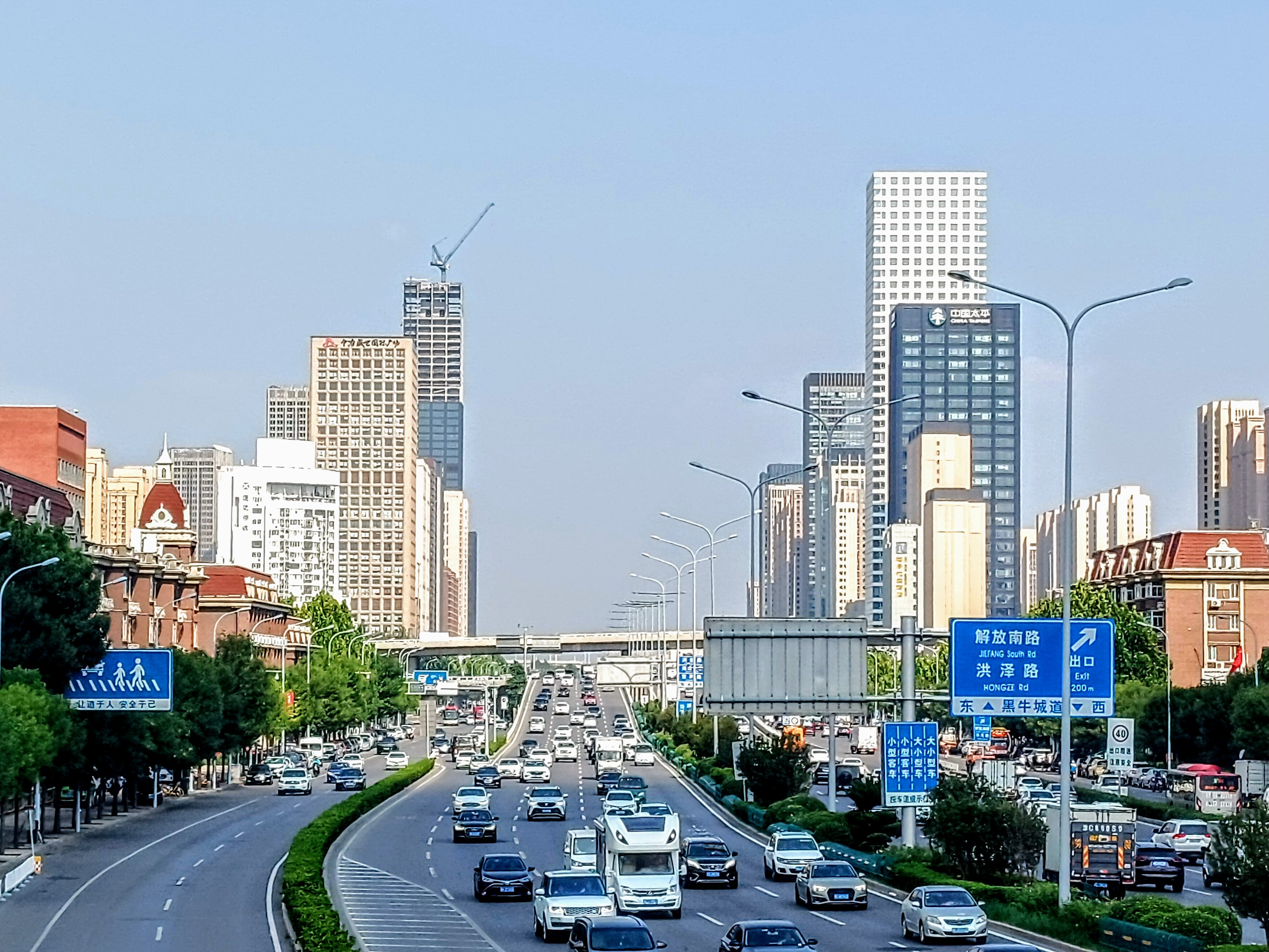
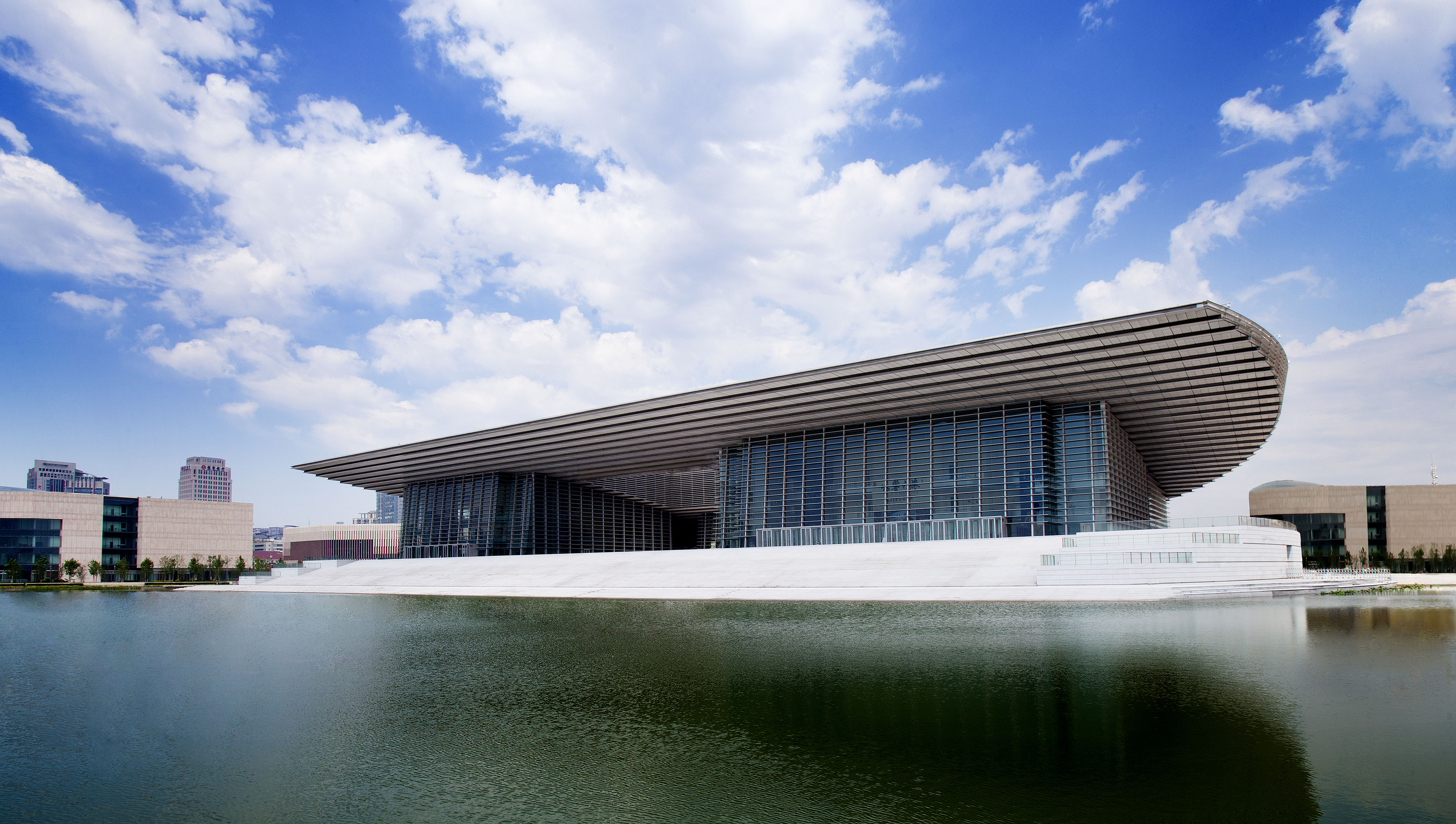
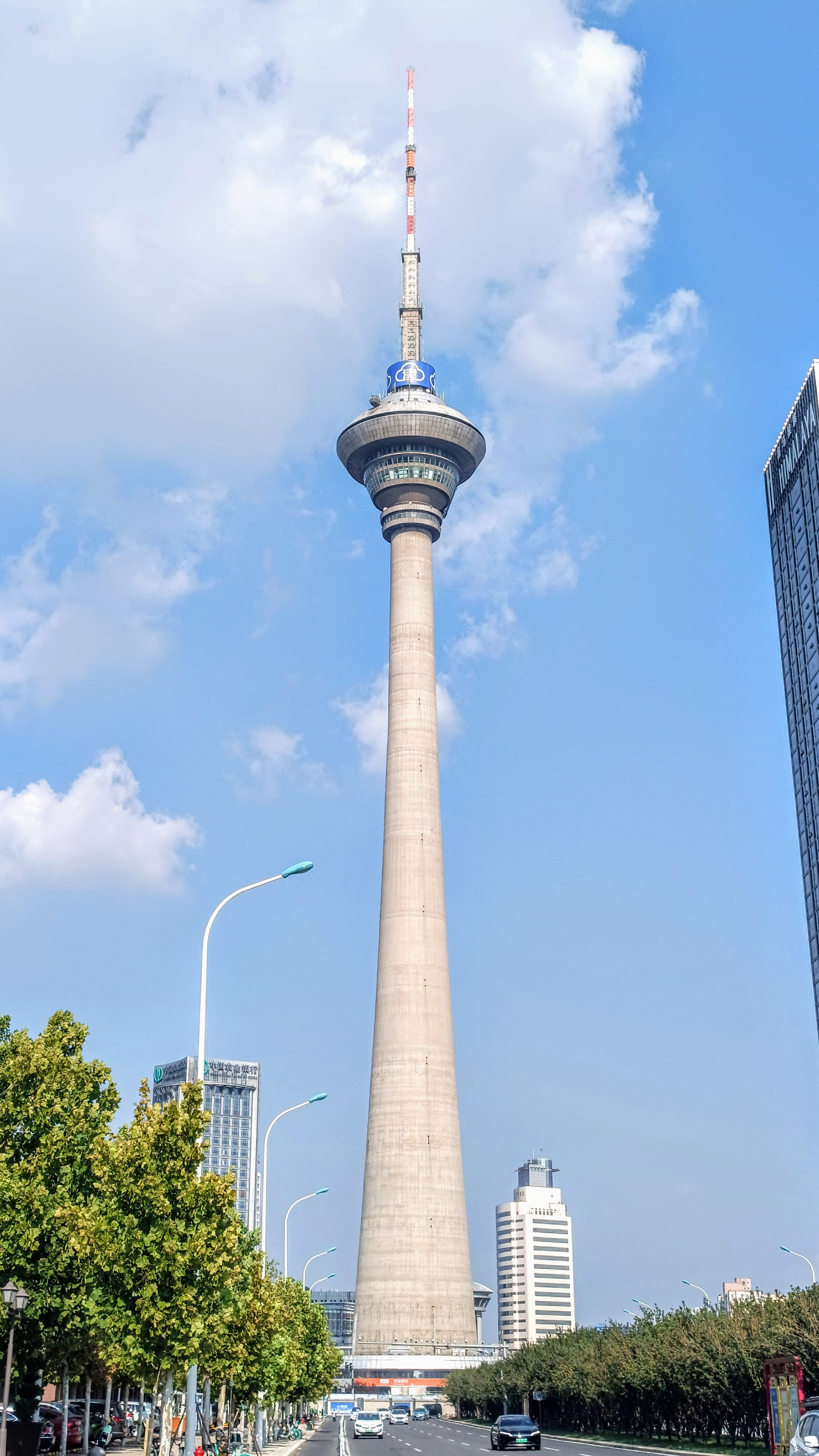
- Interactive map of Hexi
- Coordinates (Hexi government): 39°06′34″N 117°13′24″E
- Country: People's Republic of China
- Municipality: Tianjin
- Township-level divisions: 13 subdistricts

Area
  - Total: 37 km^{2} (14 sq mi)

Population (2020)
  - Total: 822,174
  - Density: 22,000/km^{2} (58,000/sq mi)
- Time zone: UTC+8 (China Standard)
- Postal code: 300202
- Division code: HXQ
Tianjin district map
Subdivisions of Tianjin
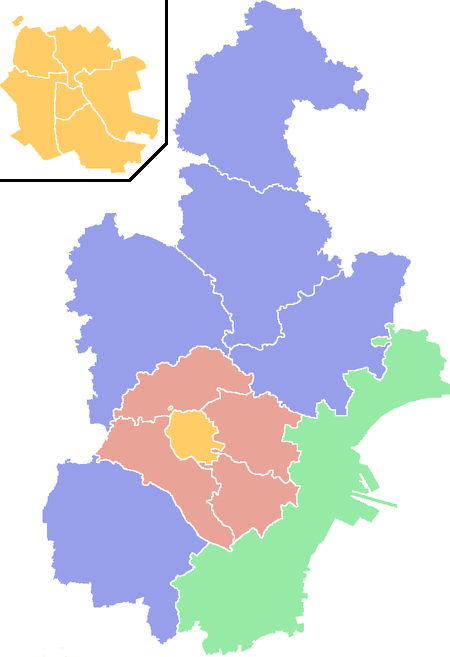
Core districts See inset
1	Heping
2	Hedong
3	Hexi
4	Nankai
5	Hebei
6	Hongqiao
Suburbs
7	Dongli
8	Xiqing
9	Jinnan
10	Beichen
Binhai and Rural
13	Binhai	14	Ninghe
11	Wuqing	15	Jinghai
12	Baodi	16	Ji Zhou
- Website: www.tjhx.gov.cn

Hexi District (simplified Chinese: 河西区; traditional Chinese: 河西區; pinyin: Héxī Qū; lit. 'west of the (Hai) River")' is a district in the south-western corner of urban Tianjin, People's Republic of China. It is bordered by Heping District in the north-west, Hedong District to the north-east, and Nankai District to the west. As of 2020, the district has a total population of 822,174.

== History ==
During the Northern Song dynasty, this area was on the border with Jin, and belonged to the Hechi county. In 1110 it was transferred into Jinghai county, before got merged into Qianning county 3 years later. Following the Jingkang incident, Qianning county was ceded to Jin dynasty, who reinstated Jinghai county.

The region remained under the same administrative division through Yuan and Ming dynasty. In 1731, the Qing government combined it into the newly created Tianjin county.

In 1895, a portion of the region was ceded to Germany as concession. The concession was taken back by the Beiyang government in 1917, and made into the first special district. During the Japanese occupation, part of the first district was made into the sixth district in 1938, the first special district was renamed the tenth district in 1943, and later combined into the sixth district in 1944.

In 1956, People's Republic of China renamed the sixth district as the current Hexi district. During the Cultural Revolution, Hexi district was changed to Hongqi (Chinese: 红旗; lit. 'Red Flag') district from 1966 to 1968.

== Administrative divisions ==
There are 14 subdistricts in the district:

Name	Chinese (S)	Hanyu Pinyin	Population (2010)	Area (km^{2})
Dayingmen Subdistrict	大营门街道	Dàyíngmén Jiēdào	28,358	0.99
Xiawafang Subdistrict	下瓦房街道	Xiàwǎfáng Jiēdào	49,767	1.693
Taoyuan Subdistrict	桃园街道	Táoyuán Jiēdào	51,061	1.4
Guajiasi Subdistrict	挂甲寺街道	Guàjiǎsì Jiēdào	88,190	2.63
Machang Subdistrict	马场街道	Mǎchǎng Jiēdào	54,949	4.12
Yuexiu Road Subdistrict	越秀路街道	Yuèxiùlù Jiēdào	76,409	3.69
Youyi Road Subdistrict	友谊路街道	Yǒuyìlù Jiēdào	77,883	2.87
Tianta Subdistrict	天塔街道	Tiāntǎ Jiēdào	83,753	3.28
Jianshan Subdistrict	尖山街道	Jiānshān Jiēdào	91,767	6.36
Chentangzhuang Subdistrict	陈塘庄街道	Chéntángzhuāng Jiēdào	59,256	5.9
Liulin Subdistrict	柳林街道	Liǔlín Jiēdào	101,679	4.2
Donghai Subdistrict	东海街道	Dōnghǎi Jiēdào	80,013	2.12
Meijiang Subdistrict	梅江街道	Méijiāng Jiēdào	27,547	2.6
Taihu Road Subdistrict	太湖路街道	Tàihúlù Jiēdào	N/A	4.59

== Transportation ==
=== Metro ===
Hexi is currently served by two metro lines operated by Tianjin Metro:

- Line 1 - Caijingdaxue, Huashanli, Fuxingmen, Chentangzhuang, Tucheng, Nanlou, Xiawafang
- Line 3 - Wujiayao

== Educational institutions ==
=== Major secondary schools ===
- Tianjin Experimental High School
- Tianjin Haihe High School
- Tianjin High School Affiliated to Beijing Normal University
- Tianjin No.4 High School
- Tianjin No.41 High School
- Tianjin No.42 High School
- Tianjin Xinhua High School

=== International schools ===
- Tianjin International School

=== Universities ===
- Tianjin Foreign Studies University
- Tianjin University of Finance and Economics
- Tianjin University of Science and Technology
- Tianjin University of Sport (Satellite campus, main campus in Jinghai.)
- Tianjin University of Technology and Education
- Tianjin University
- Nankai University
- Hebei University of Technology

== Attractions ==
- Tianjin Amusement Park
- Tianjin Grand Theatre
- Jiefang South Park
- People's Park
