= Guajiasi Subdistrict =

Guajiasi Subdistrict 挂甲寺街道
- Subdistrict
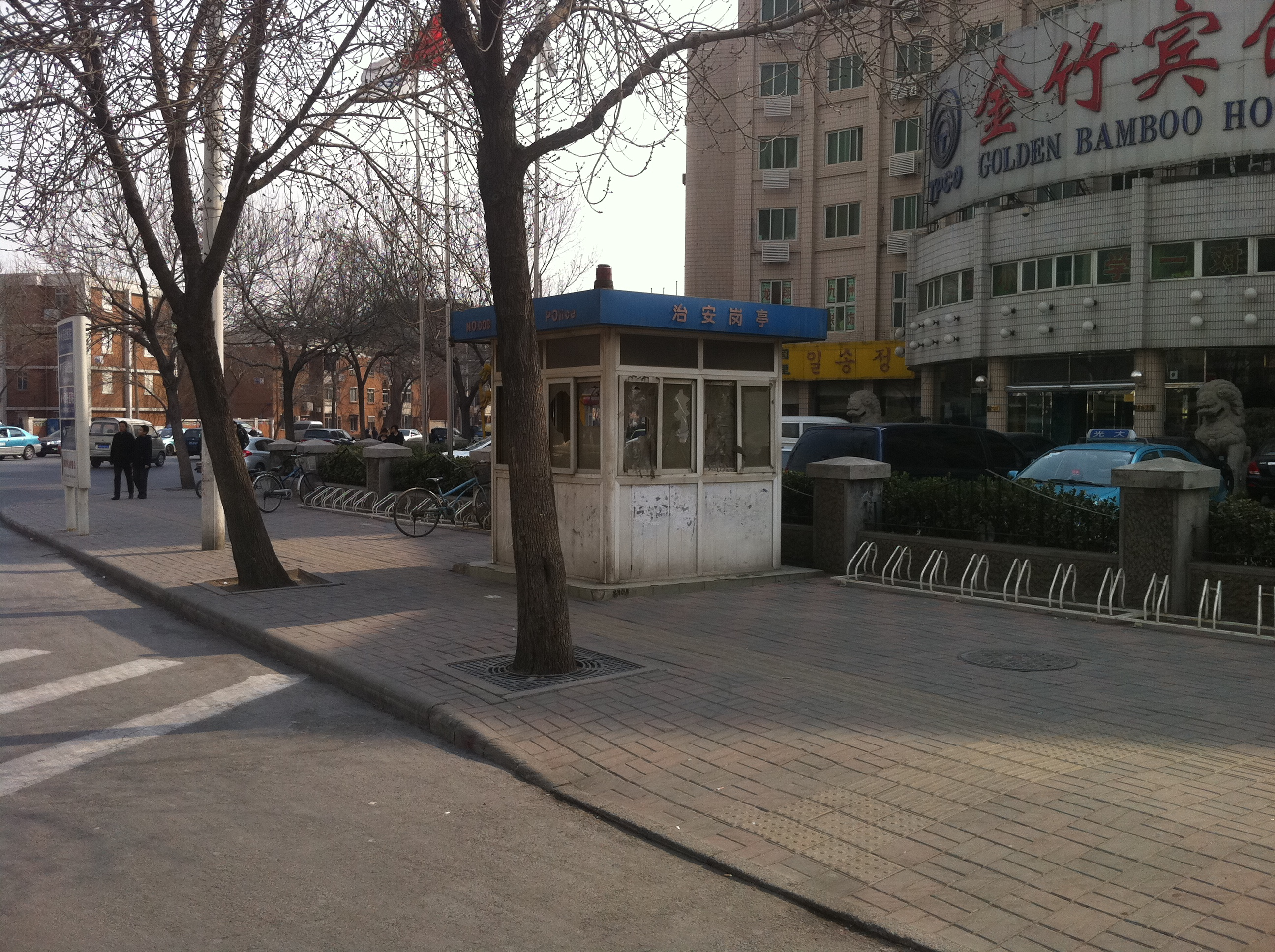
- Section of Weidi Avenue within the subdistrict, 2011

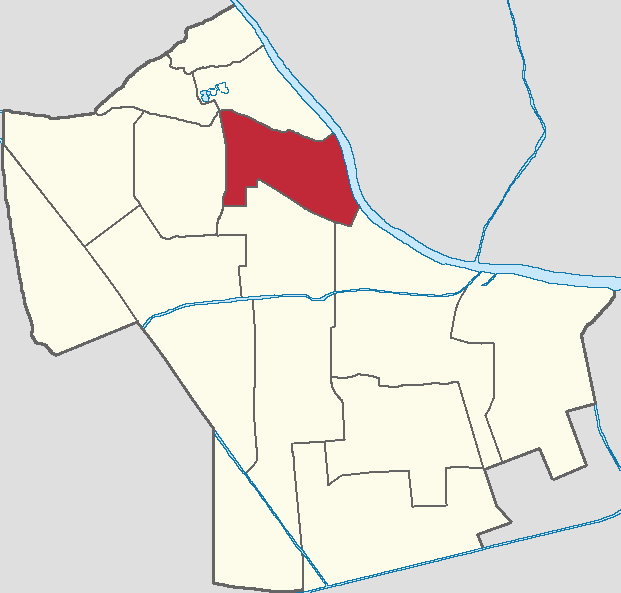
- Location in Hexi District

- Location within Tianjin Location within China
- Coordinates: 39°05′17″N 117°13′51″E
- Country: China
- Municipality: Tianjin
- District: Hexi
- Village-level Divisions: 13 communities

Area
  - Total: 2.63 km^{2} (1.02 sq mi)
- Elevation: 6 m (20 ft)

Population (2010)
  - Total: 88,190
  - Density: 33,500/km^{2} (86,800/sq mi)
- Time zone: UTC+8 (China Standard)
- Postal code: 300200
- Area code: 022

Guajiasi Subdistrict (simplified Chinese: 挂甲寺街道; traditional Chinese: 掛甲寺街道; pinyin: Guàjiǎsì Jiēdào) is a subdistrict situated on the northern portion of Hexi District, Tianjin, China. It is located in the south of Xiawafang Subdistrict, west of Fumin Road Subdistrict, north of Chentangzhuang and Jianshan Subdistricts, and east of Yuexiu Road Subdistrict. According to the 2020 census, its total population was 88,190.

The subdistrict was formed in 1954. Its name is referring to Guajia Chan (Chinese: 挂甲禅; lit. 'Hanging-Armor Zen') Temple that is situated on the north of the subdistrict.

== Administrative divisions ==
As of the time in writing, Guajiasi Subdistrict consists of 13 communities. They are, by the order of their Administrative Division Codes:

Subdivision names	Name transliterations
鹤望里	Hewangli
景兴西里	Jingxing Xili
龙都花园	Longdu Huayuan
重华里	Chonghuali
美化里	Meihuali
南北大街	Nanbei Dajie
前程里	Qianchengli
古海里	Guhaili
美好里	Meihaoli
云广新里	Yunguang Xinli
滦水里	Luanshuili
新城小区	Xincheng Xiaoqu
海景雅苑	Haijing Yayuan
