= Yuexiu Road Subdistrict =

Yuexiu Road Subdistrict 越秀路街道
- Subdistrict
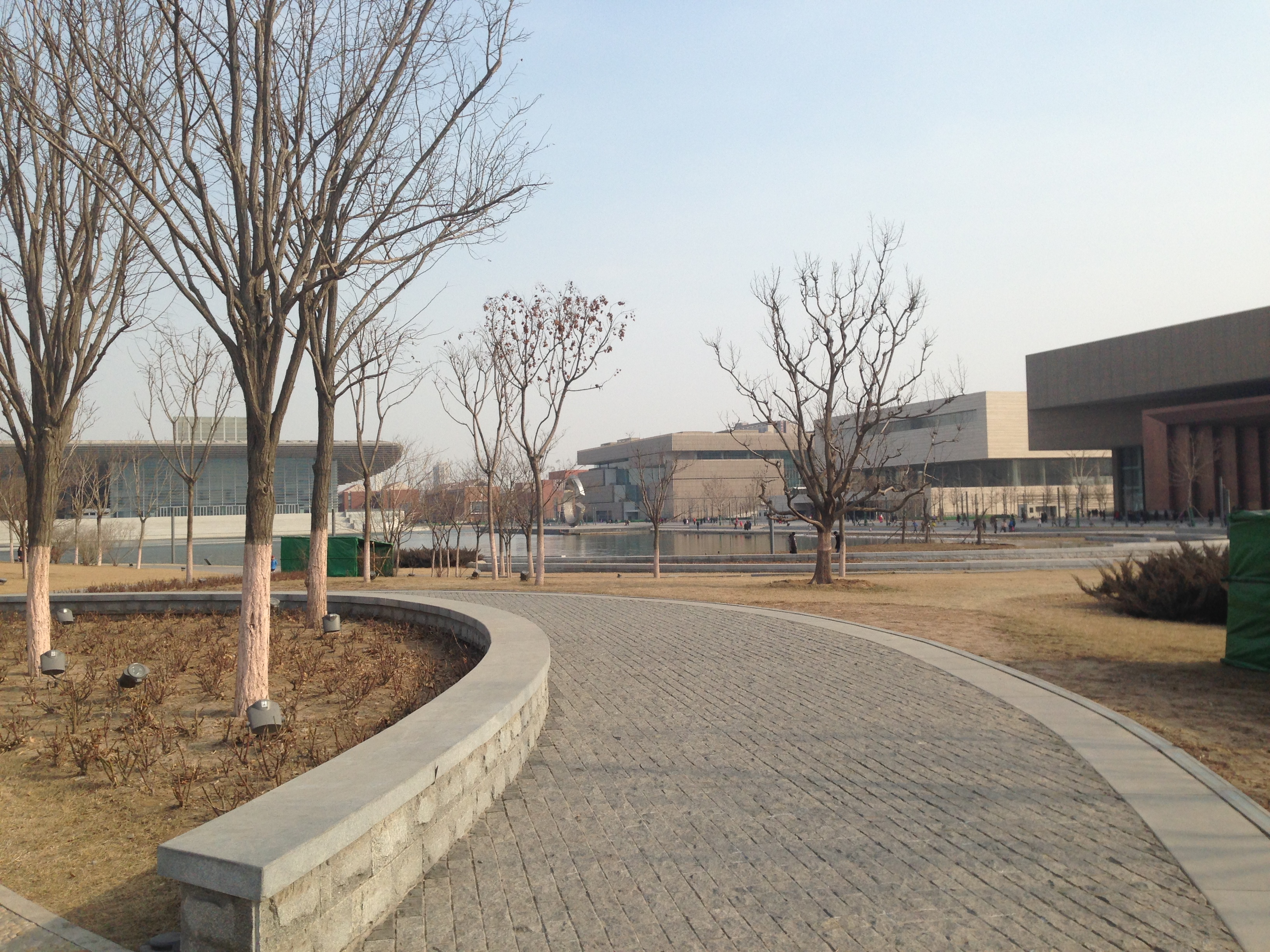
- Exterior of Tianjin Cultural Center south of the subdistrict, 2014

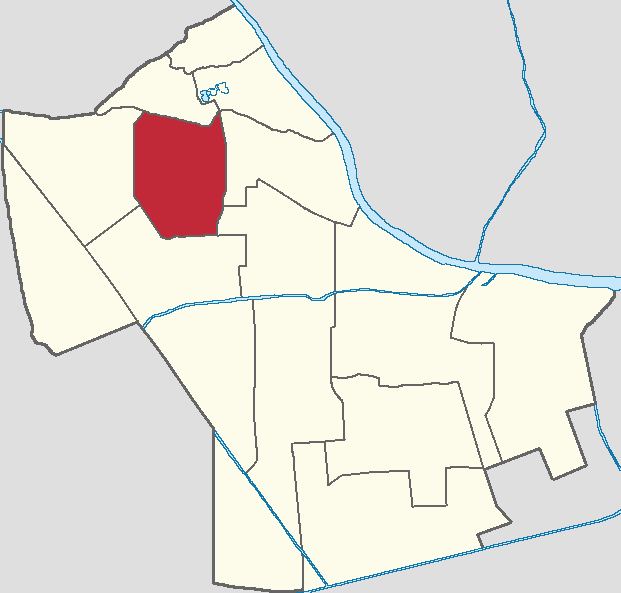
- Location in Hexi District

- Location within Tianjin Location within China
- Coordinates: 39°05′38″N 117°12′16″E
- Country: China
- Municipality: Tianjin
- District: Hexi
- Village-level Divisions: 10 communities

Area
  - Total: 3.69 km^{2} (1.42 sq mi)
- Elevation: 7 m (23 ft)

Population (2010)
  - Total: 76,409
  - Density: 20,700/km^{2} (53,600/sq mi)
- Time zone: UTC+8 (China Standard)
- Postal code: 300201
- Area code: 022

Yuexiu Road Subdistrict (Chinese: 越秀路街道; pinyin: Yuèxiùlù Jiēdào) is a subdistrict situated on the northern side of Hexi District, Tianjin, China. It shares border with Taoyuan Subdistrict to its north, Guajiasi and Jianshan Subdistricts to its east, Youyi Road Subdistrict to its south, and Machang Subdistrict to its west. In the year 2010, it had 76,409 inhabitants under its administration.

The name Yuexiu can be translated as "Exceed Elegance".

== History ==
Timeline of Yuexiu Road Subdistrict
| Year | Status | Belong to |
|---|---|---|
| 1963 - 1964 | Tonglou Subdistrict | Hexi District, Tianjin |
| 1964 - 1985 | Sihaolu Subdistrict | Hexi District, Tianjin |
| 1985–present | Yuexiu Road Subdistrict (Xinanlou Subdistrict joined in 2000) | Hexi District, Tianjin |

== Administrative divisions ==
At the end of 2021, Yuexiu Road Subdistrict was composed of the following 10 communities:

| Subdivision names | Name transliterations |
|---|---|
| 红波里 | Hongboli |
| 黄埔里 | Huangpuli |
| 恩德里 | Endeli |
| 珠海里 | Zhuhaili |
| 增强楼 | Zengqianglou |
| 教师村 | Jiaoshicun |
| 惠阳里 | Huiyangli |
| 港云里 | Gangyunli |
| 祥和里 | Xiangheli |
| 爱国里 | Aiguoli |

== Gallery ==
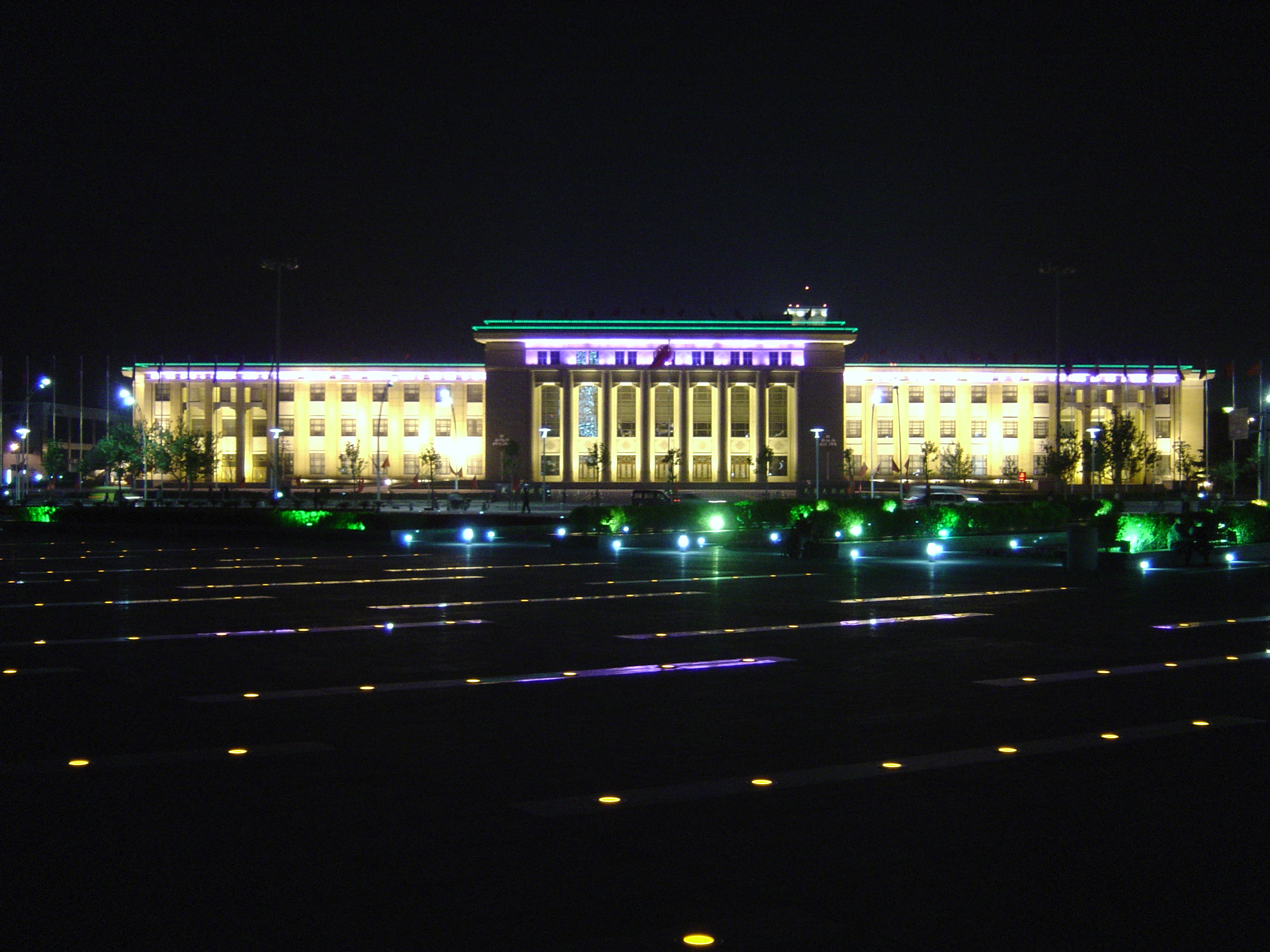
Night view of building along Youyi Road, 2004

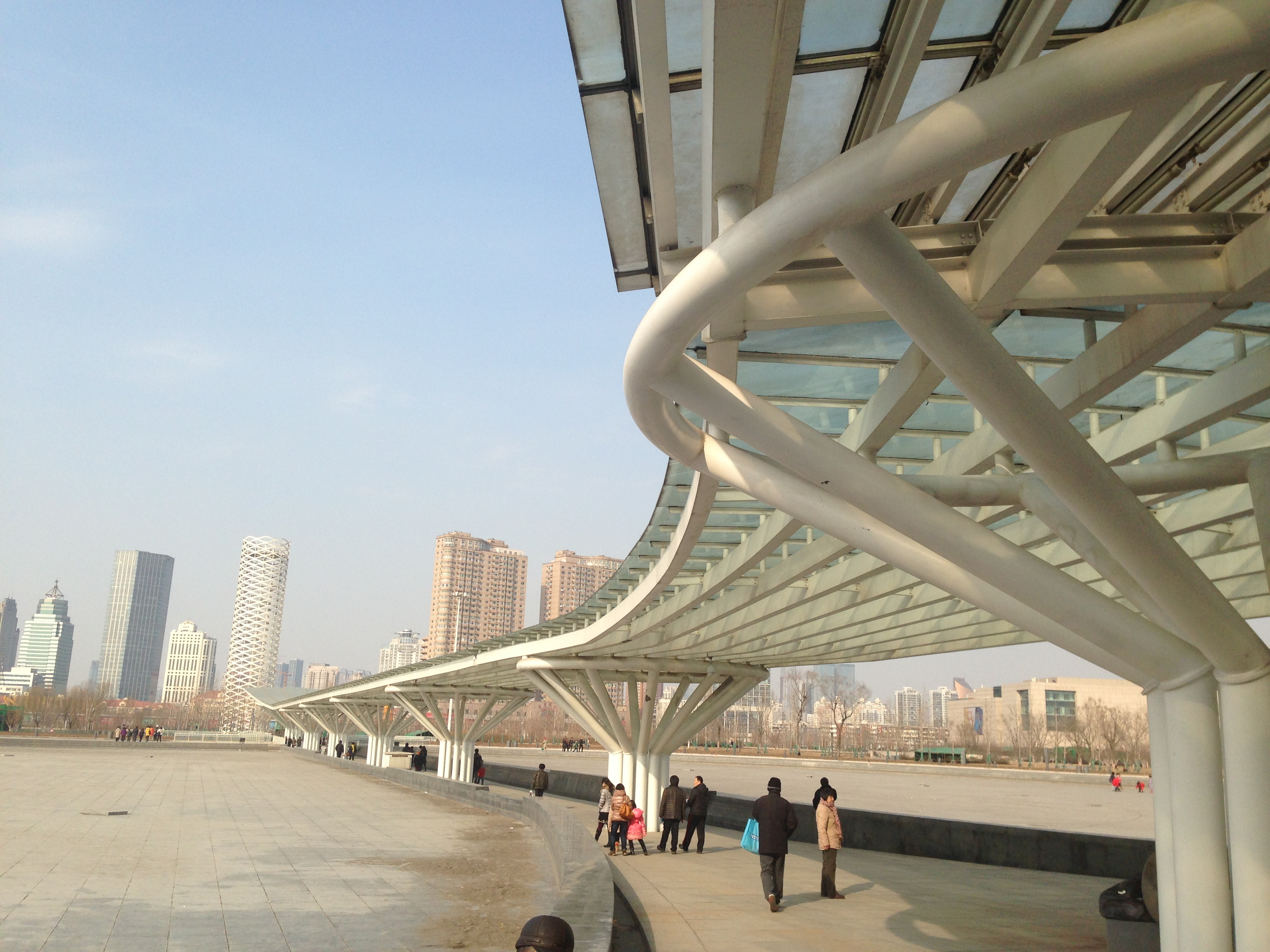
Exterior of Tianjin Museum, 2014
