= Xiawafang Subdistrict =

Xiawafang Subdistrict 下瓦房街道
- Subdistrict
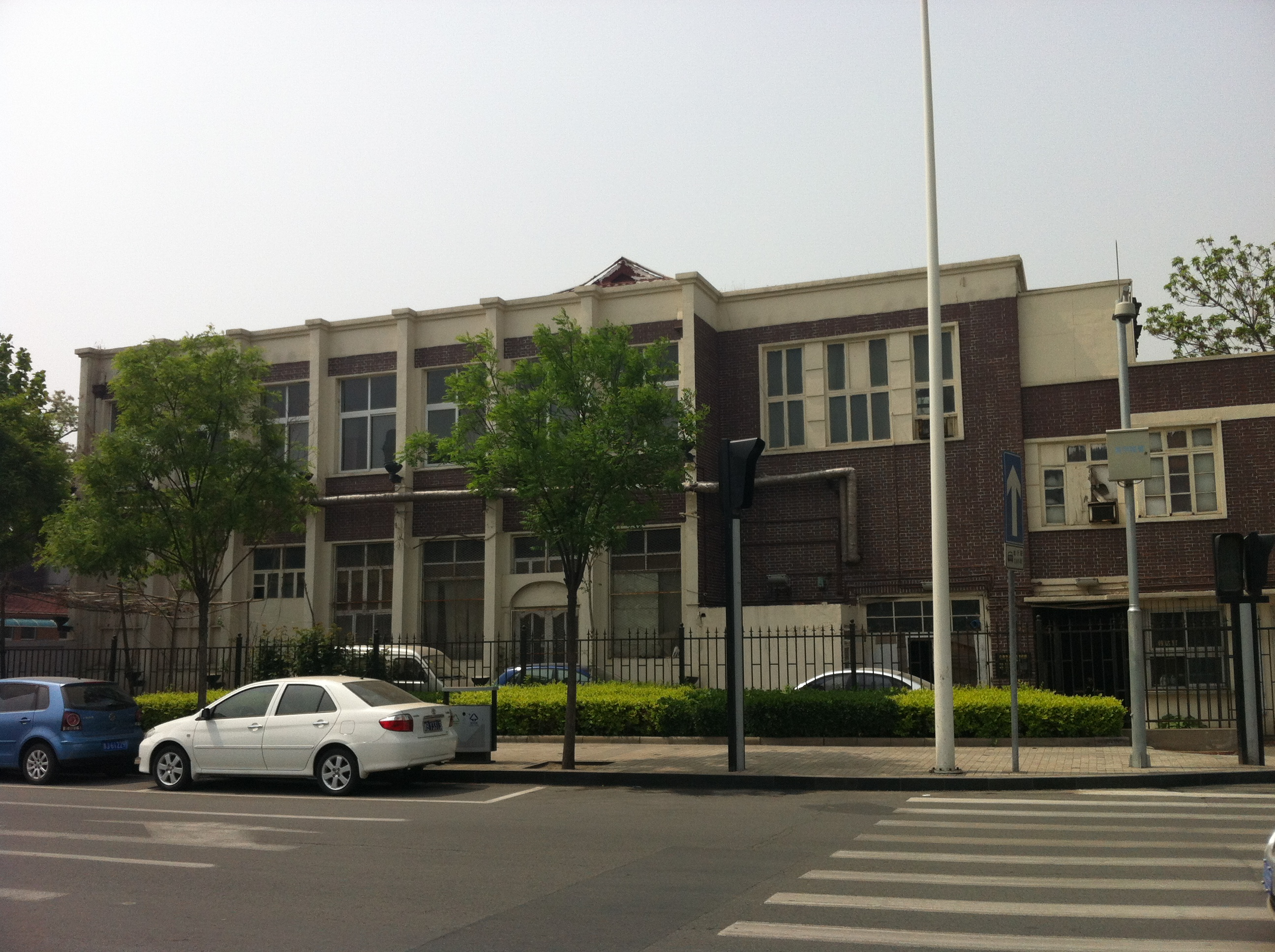
- Former Danish Consulate in Tianjin, 2012

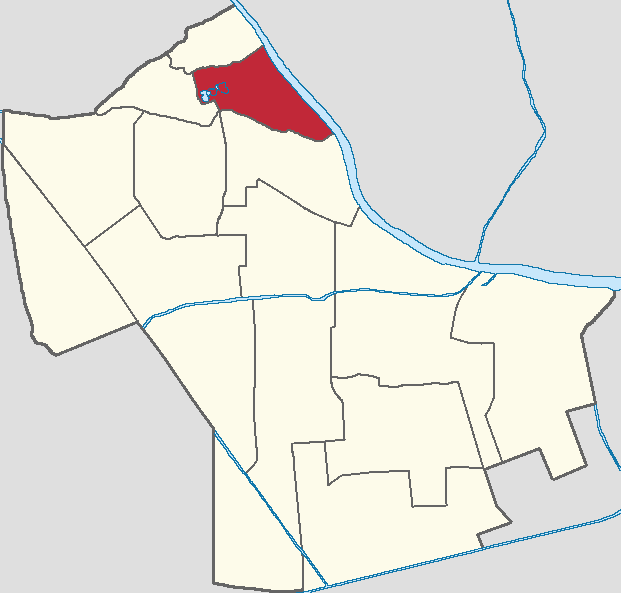
- Location of Xiawafang within Hexi District

- Location within Tianjin Location within China
- Coordinates: 39°06′18″N 117°13′08″E
- Country: China
- Municipality: Tianjin
- District: Hexi
- Village-level Divisions: 10 communities

Area
  - Total: 1.69 km^{2} (0.65 sq mi)
- Elevation: 7 m (23 ft)

Population (2010)
  - Total: 49,767
  - Density: 29,400/km^{2} (76,300/sq mi)
- Time zone: UTC+8 (China Standard)
- Postal code: 300202
- Area code: 022

Xiawafang Subdistrict (Chinese: 下瓦房街道; pinyin: Xiàwǎfáng Jiēdào) is a subdistrict in the northern part of Hexi District, Tianjin. it borders Dawangzhuang and Dazhigu Subdistricts in the northeast, Guajiasi Subdistrict in the south, Taoyuan Subdistrict in the west, and Dayingmen Subdistrict in the northwest. In 2010, its population was 49,767.

Its name Xiawafang (Chinese: 下瓦房; lit. 'Down Tile House') originated in late Qing dynasty, when a three-room teahouse was constructed here in the downstream of Hai River, and became popular among the local population.

== History ==
Timeline of Xiawafang Subdistrict
Year	Status	Belong to
1954 - 1956	Jiujiang Road Subdistrict Sanyizhuang Subdistrict Nanhuali Subdistrict	6th District, Tianjin
1956 - 1960	Xiawafang Subdistrict (Integrated Liuzhuang Subdistrict in 1958	Hexi District, Tianjin
1960 - 1961	Xiawafang People's Commune	Hexi District, Tianjin
1961 - 1963	Xiawafang Subdistrict	Hexi District, Tianjin
1963 - 1968	Xiawafang Subdistrict Liuzhuang Subdistrict	Hexi District, Tianjin
1968 - 1978	Xiawafang Revolutionary Committee Liuzhuang Revolutionary Committee	Hexi District, Tianjin
1978 - 2000	Xiawafang Subdistrict Liuzhuang Subdistrict	Hexi District, Tianjin
2000–present	Xiawafang Subdistrict	Hexi District, Tianjin

== Administrative divisions ==
In 2021, Xiawafang Subdistrict was formed from these 10 communities:

Subdivision names	Name transliterations
福建路	Fujianlu
台北路	Taibeilu
福至里	Fuzhili
大沽路	Dagulu
南华里	Nanhuali
龙海公寓	Longhai Gongyu
东舍宅	Dongshezhai
富裕广场	Fuyu Guangchang
福盛花园	Fusheng Huayuan
铂津湾	Bojinwan

== Gallery ==
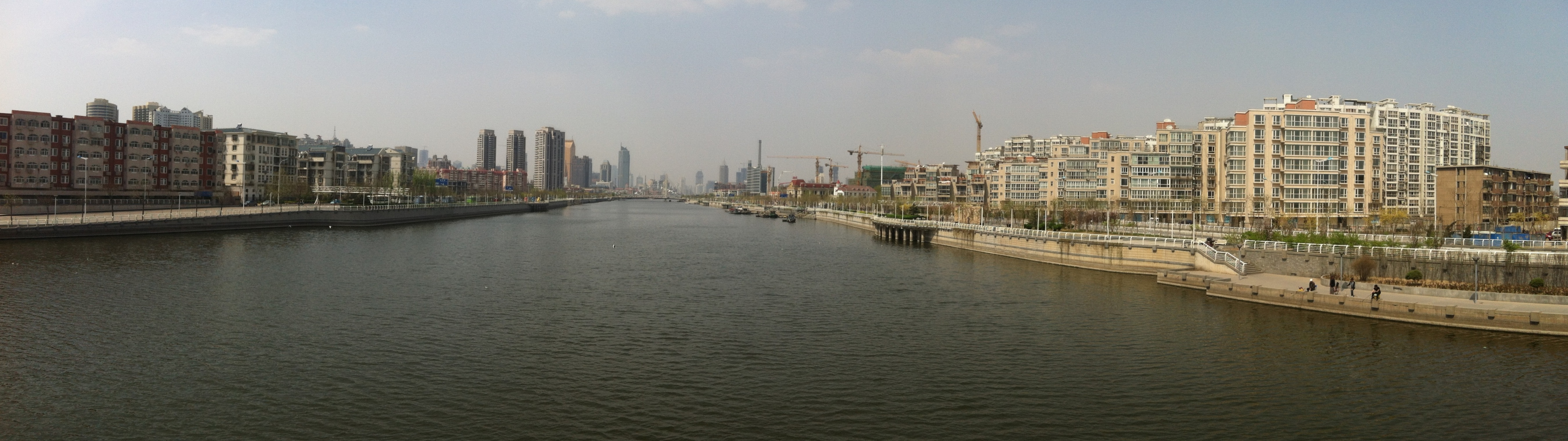
Section of the Hai River around this subdistrict, 2012

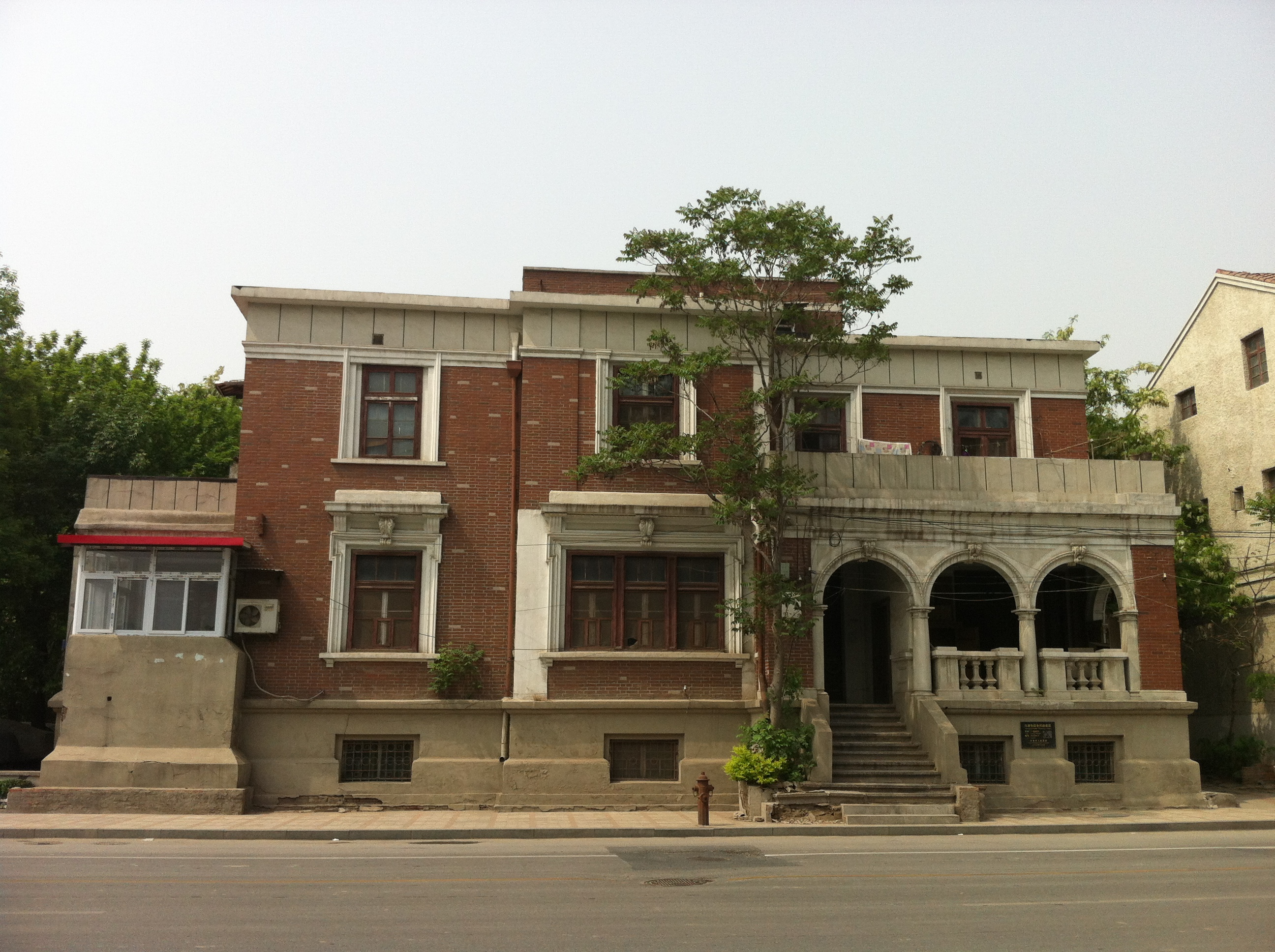
One of the Historical and Stylistist Architectures of Tianjin in 288 Jiefang South Road, 2012

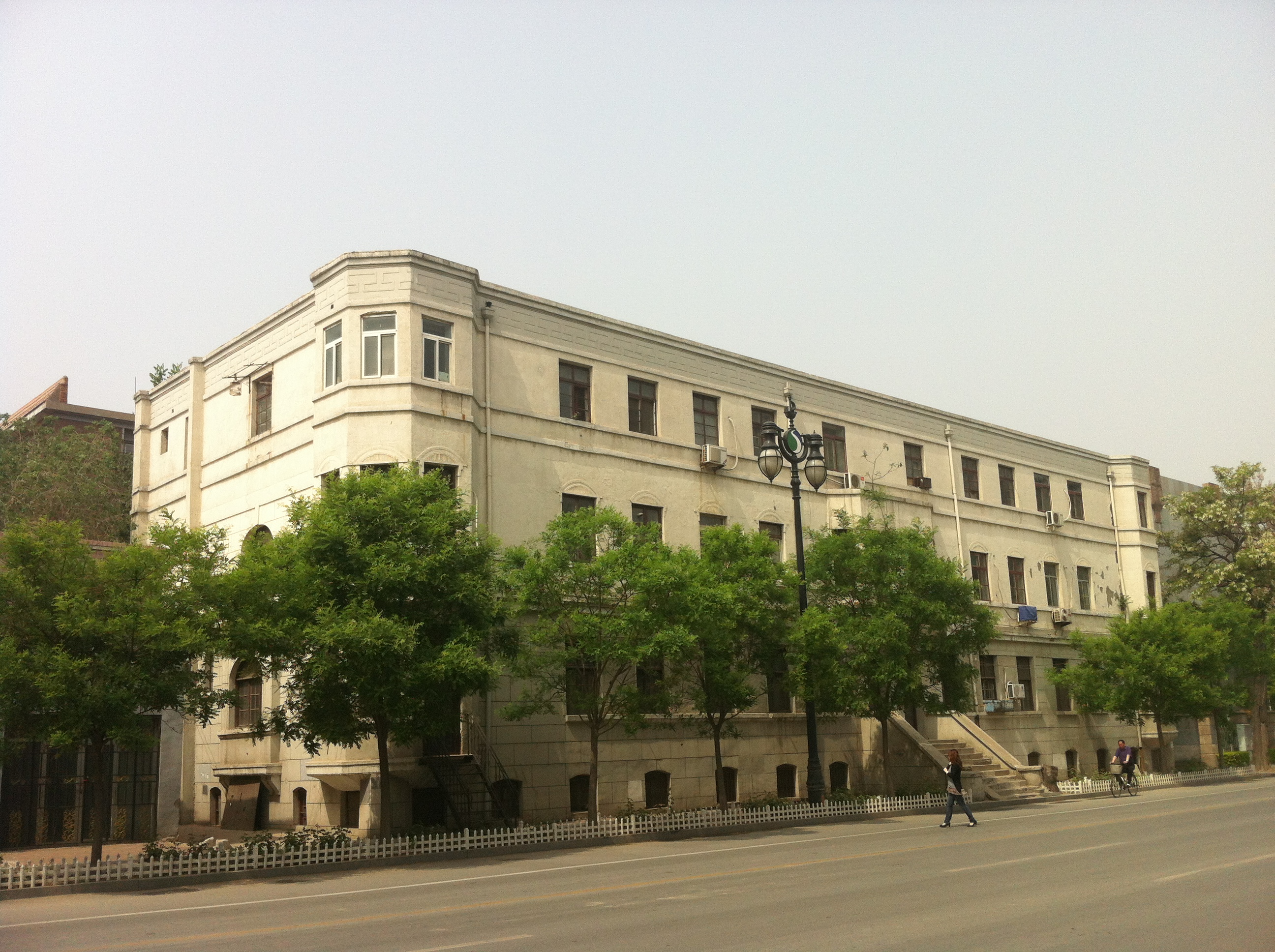
One of the Historical and Stylistist Architectures of Tianjin in 294-298 Jiefang South Road, 2012

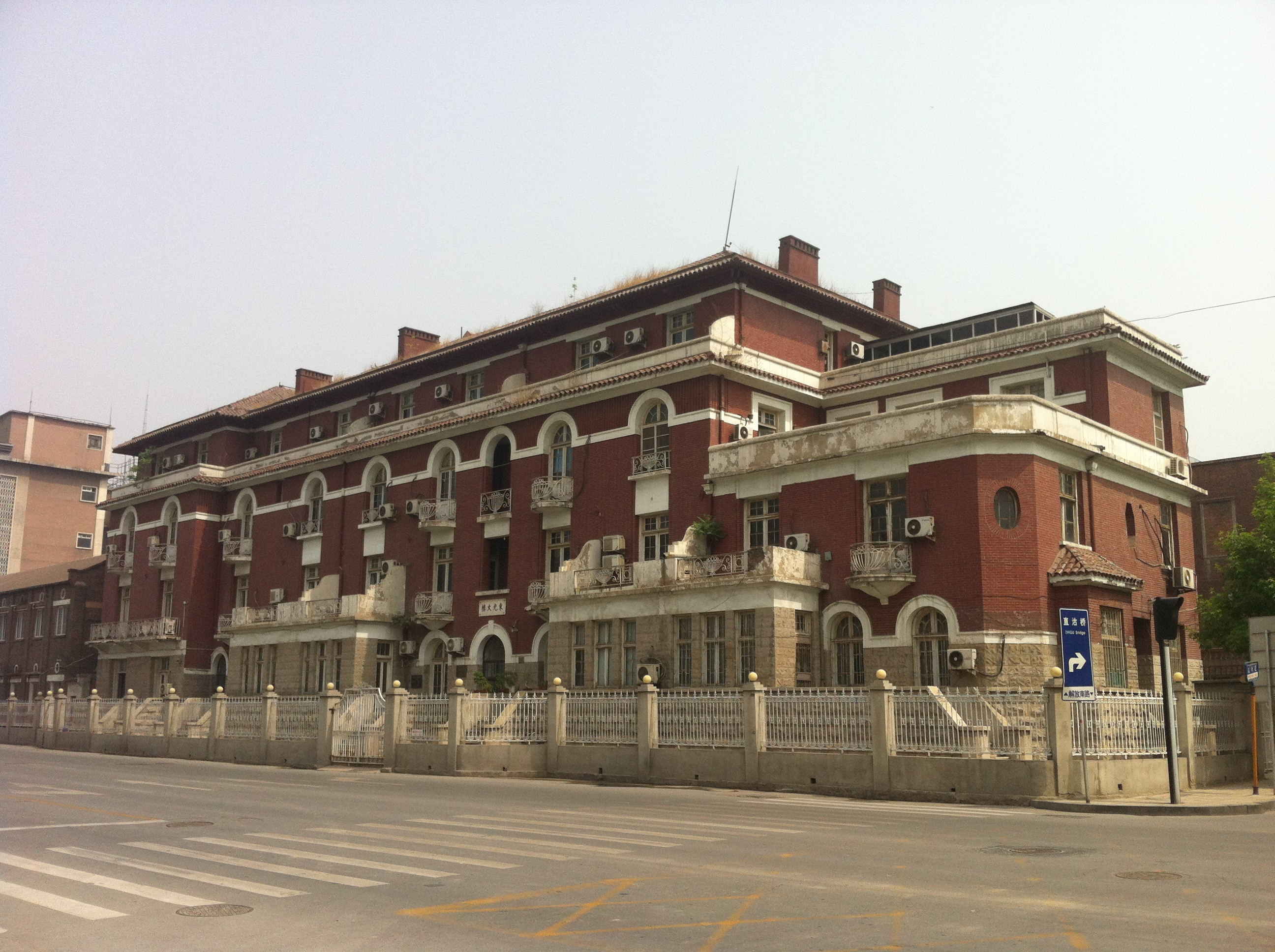
Dongguang Building, 2012
