= Chentangzhuang Subdistrict =

Chentangzhuang Subdistrict 陈塘庄街道
- Subdistrict
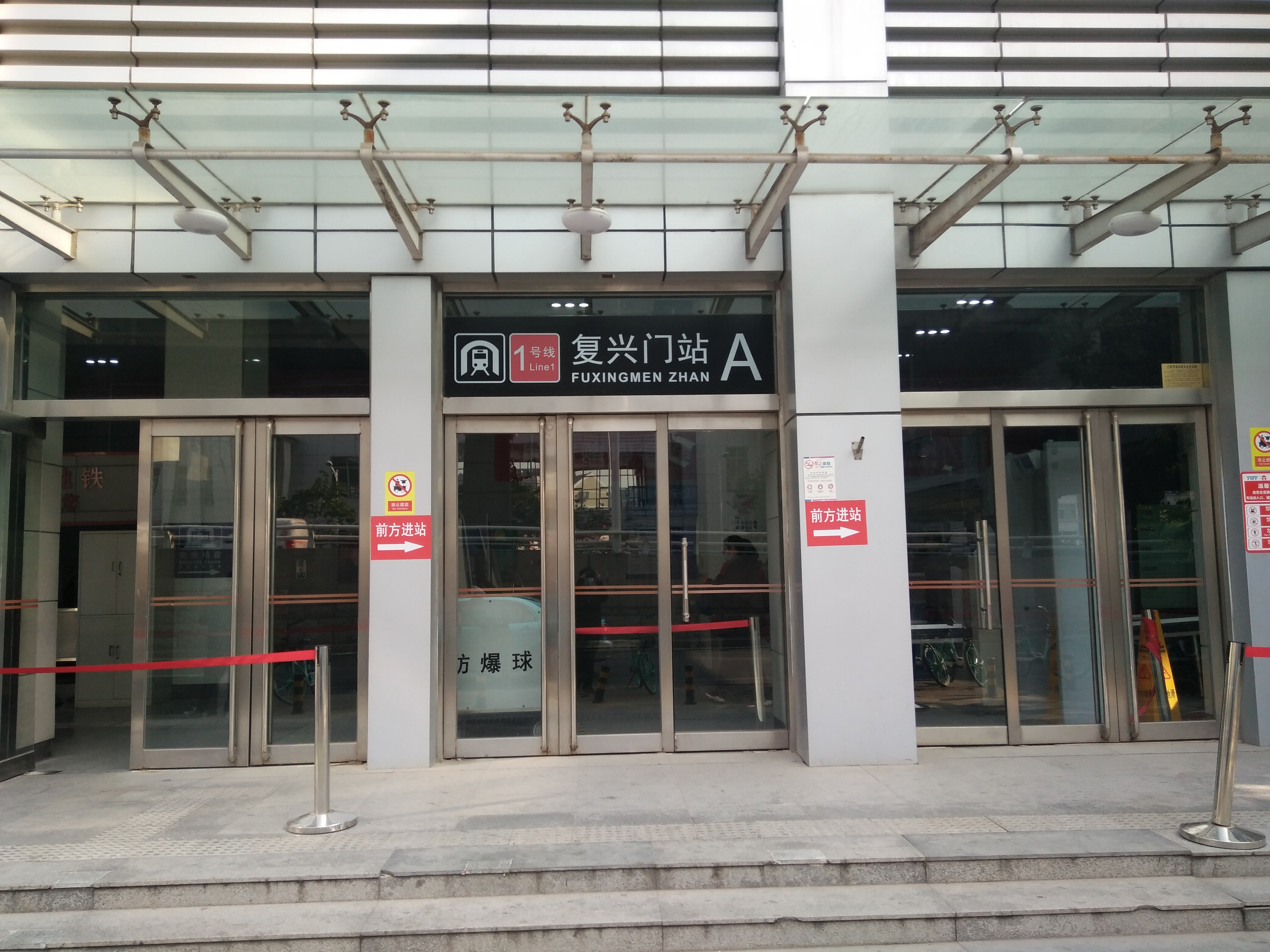
- Fuxingmen Station on the northeast of the subdistrict, 2020

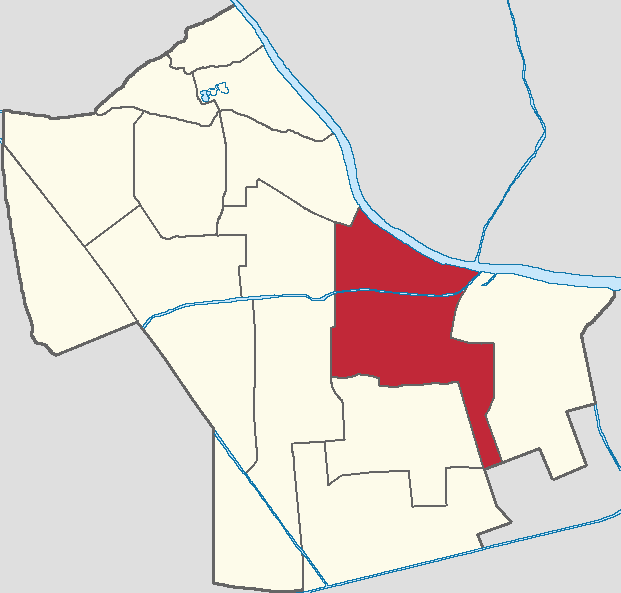
- Location in Hexi District

- Location within Tianjin Location within China
- Coordinates: 39°04′17″N 117°15′06″E
- Country: China
- Municipality: Tianjin
- District: Hexi
- Village-level Divisions: 14 communities

Area
  - Total: 5.6 km^{2} (2.2 sq mi)
- Elevation: 6 m (20 ft)

Population (2010)
  - Total: 59,256
  - Density: 11,000/km^{2} (27,000/sq mi)
- Time zone: UTC+8 (China Standard)
- Postal code: 300202
- Area code: 022

Chentangzhuang Subdistrict (simplified Chinese: 陈塘庄街道; traditional Chinese: 陳塘莊街道; pinyin: Chéntángzhuāng Jiēdào) is a subdistrict situated on the east of Hexi District, Tianjin, China. It borders Fumin Road and Wanxin Subdistricts in the northeast, Liulin Subdistrict in the east, Shuanglin Farm and Donghai Subdistrict in the south, as well as Jianshan and Guajiasi Subdistricts in the west. It had 59,256 people residing under its administration in 2010.

The subdistrict was created in 1954, and it incorporated Xiaohaidi Subdistrict in 2000. The name Chentangzhuang literally means "Chen Pond Villa".

== Geography ==
The subdistrict borders Hai River to its northeast, and is intersected by Fuxing River. Both Dongnan Banhuan Expressway and Dagu South Road go through it.

== Administrative divisions ==
At the time of writing, Chentangzhuang Subdistrict oversees 14 residential communities, which are listed as follows:

Subdivision names	Name transliterations
微山里	Weishanli
华山里	Huashanli
天山里	Tianshanli
双山新苑	Shuangshan Xinyuan
秀峰里	Xiufengli
陈塘庄	Chentangzhuang
六合里	Liuheli
七贤南里	Qixian Nanli
贵山里	Guishanli
四季馨园	Siji Xinyuan
幸福家园	Xingfu Jiayuan
栖塘	Qitang
四信里	Sixinli
三诚里	Sanxinli
