= Dayingmen Subdistrict =

Dayingmen Subdistrict 大营门街道
- Subdistrict
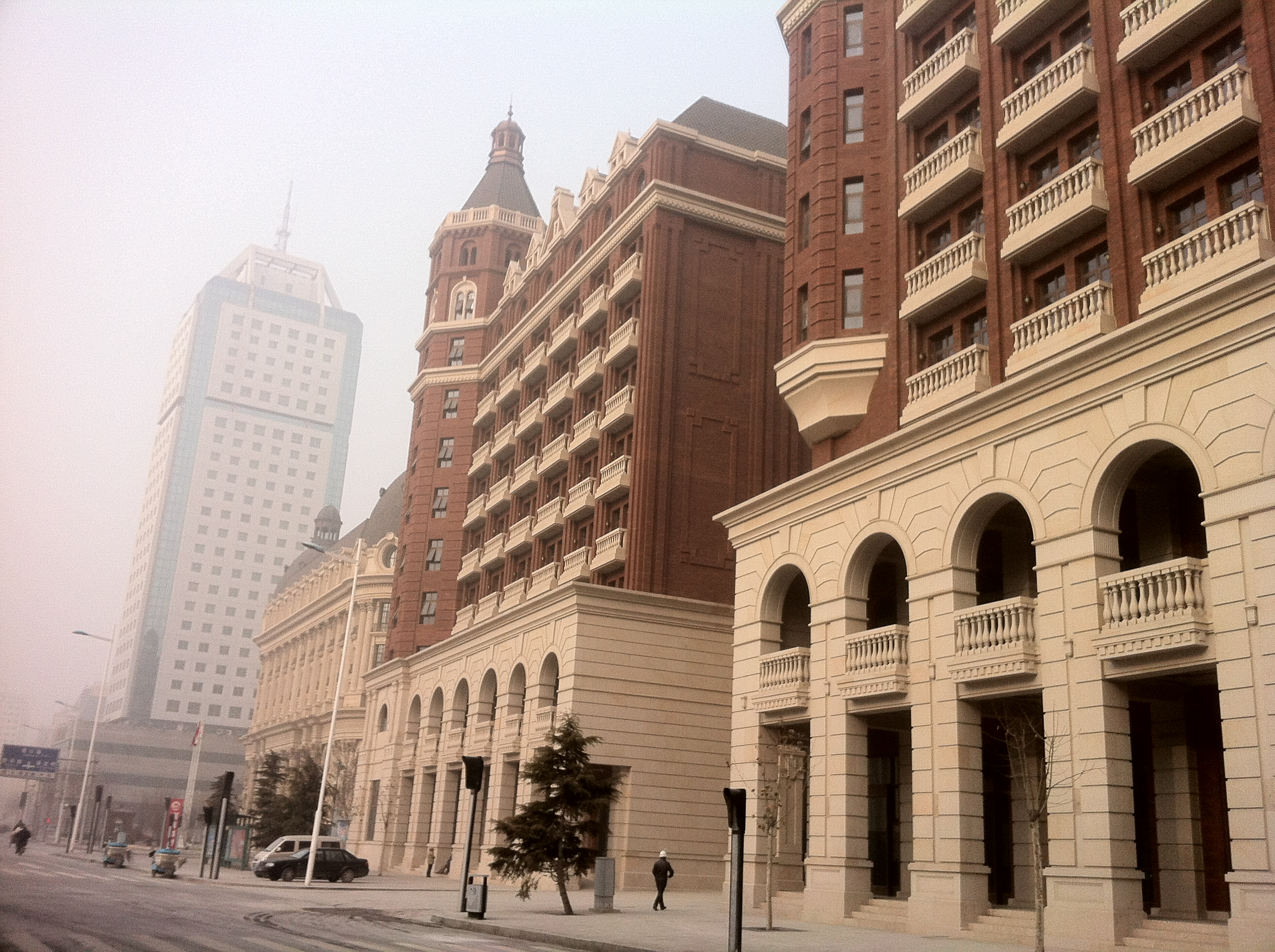
- Dagu North Road within the subdistrict, 2013

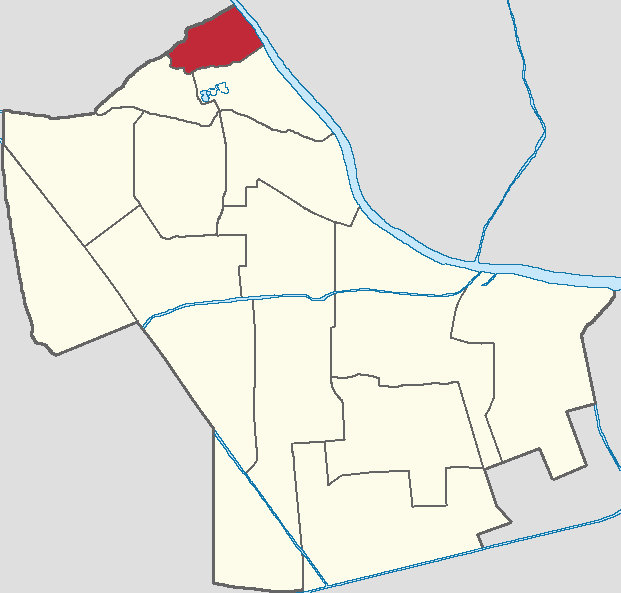
- Location in Hexi District

- Location within Tianjin Location within China
- Coordinates: 39°06′28″N 117°12′30″E
- Country: China
- Municipality: Tianjin
- District: Hexi
- Village-level Divisions: 7 communities

Area
  - Total: 0.99 km^{2} (0.38 sq mi)
- Elevation: 8 m (26 ft)

Population (2010)
  - Total: 28,358
  - Density: 29,000/km^{2} (74,000/sq mi)
- Time zone: UTC+8 (China Standard)
- Postal code: 300202
- Area code: 022

Dayingmen Subdistrict (simplified Chinese: 大营门街道; traditional Chinese: 大營門街道; pinyin: Dàyíngmén Jiēdào) is a subdistrict located on the north of Hexi District, Tianjin, China. It shares border with Dawangzhuang Subdistrict to the northeast, Xiawangfang Subdistrict to the southeast, Taoyuan Subdistrict to the southwest, as well as Xiaobailou and Wudadao Subdistricts to the northwest. As of 2010, its population was 28,358.

The name Dayingmen (Chinese: 大营门; lit. 'Great Barrack Gate') originated in 1860, when the Qing government established a military garrison here as part of Tianjin's fortification.

== History ==
History of Dayingmen Subdistrict
Year	Status	Within
1954 - 1956	Jiefangnan Road Subdistrict; Pukoudao Subdistrict; Sanyizhuang Subdistrict; Taoyuancun Subdistrict |6th District, Tianjin	
1956 - 1958	Jiefangnan Road Subdistrict; Pukoudao Subdistrict; Sanyizhuang Subdistrict; Taoyuancun Subdistrict |6th District, Tianjin	Hexi District, Tianjin
1958 - 1960	Dayingmen Subdistrict	Hexi District, Tianjin
1960 - 1963	Dayingmen People's Commune	Hexi District, Tianjin
1963 - 1996	Dayingmen Subdistrict; Sanyizhuang Subdistrict	Hexi District, Tianjin
1996–present	Dayingmen Subdistrict	Hexi District, Tianjin

== Administrative divisions ==
At the end of 2021, Dayingmen Subdistrict had direct jurisdiction over the following 7 communities:

Subdivision names	Name transliterations
九江路	Jiujianglu
荣华里	Ronghuali
浦口道	Pukoudao
三义大厦	Sanyi Dasha
敬重里	Jingzhongli
东莱里	Donglaili
蚌埠道	Bengbudao

== Gallery ==
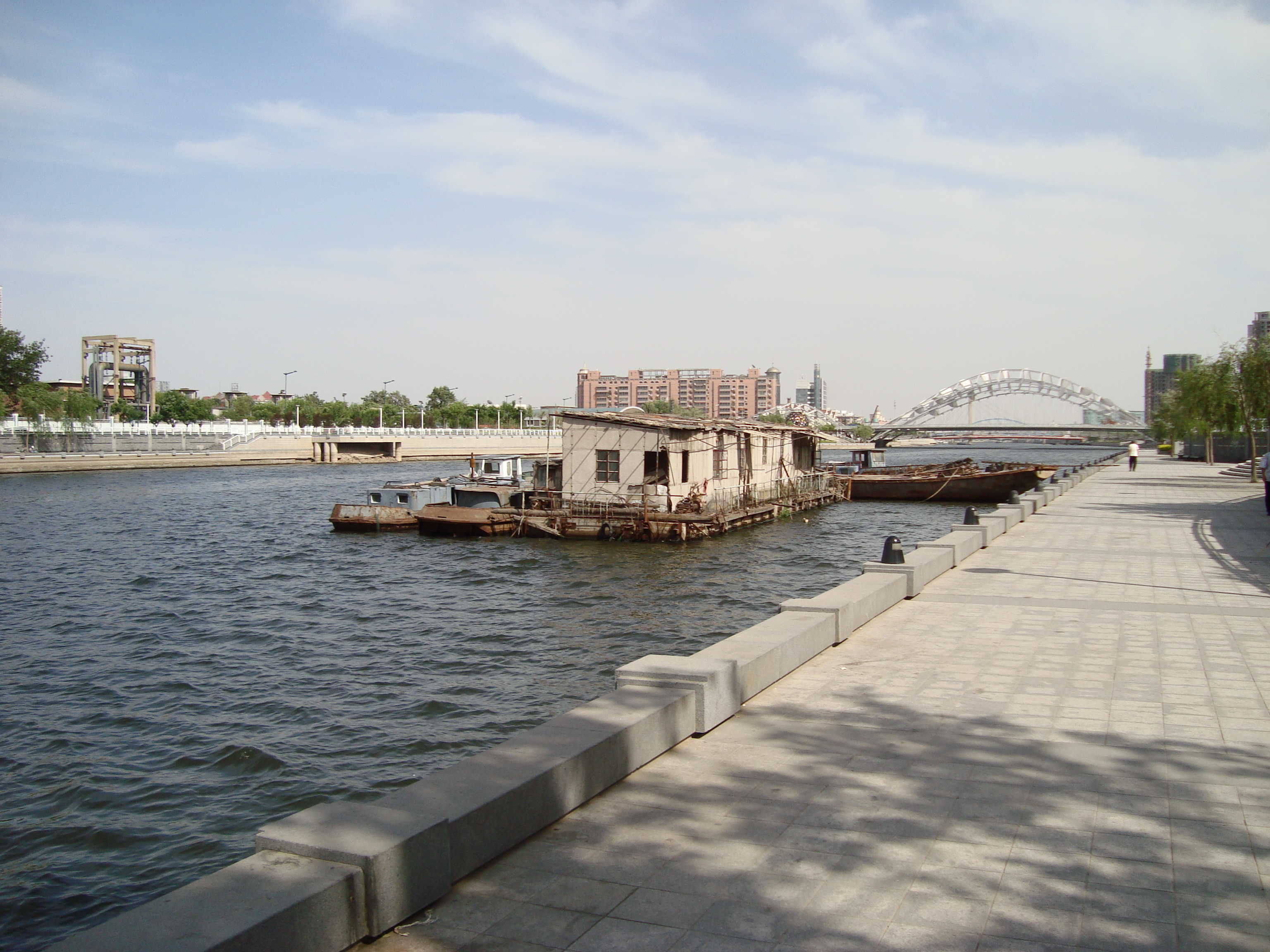
Houseboat within west bank of the Hai River, 2009

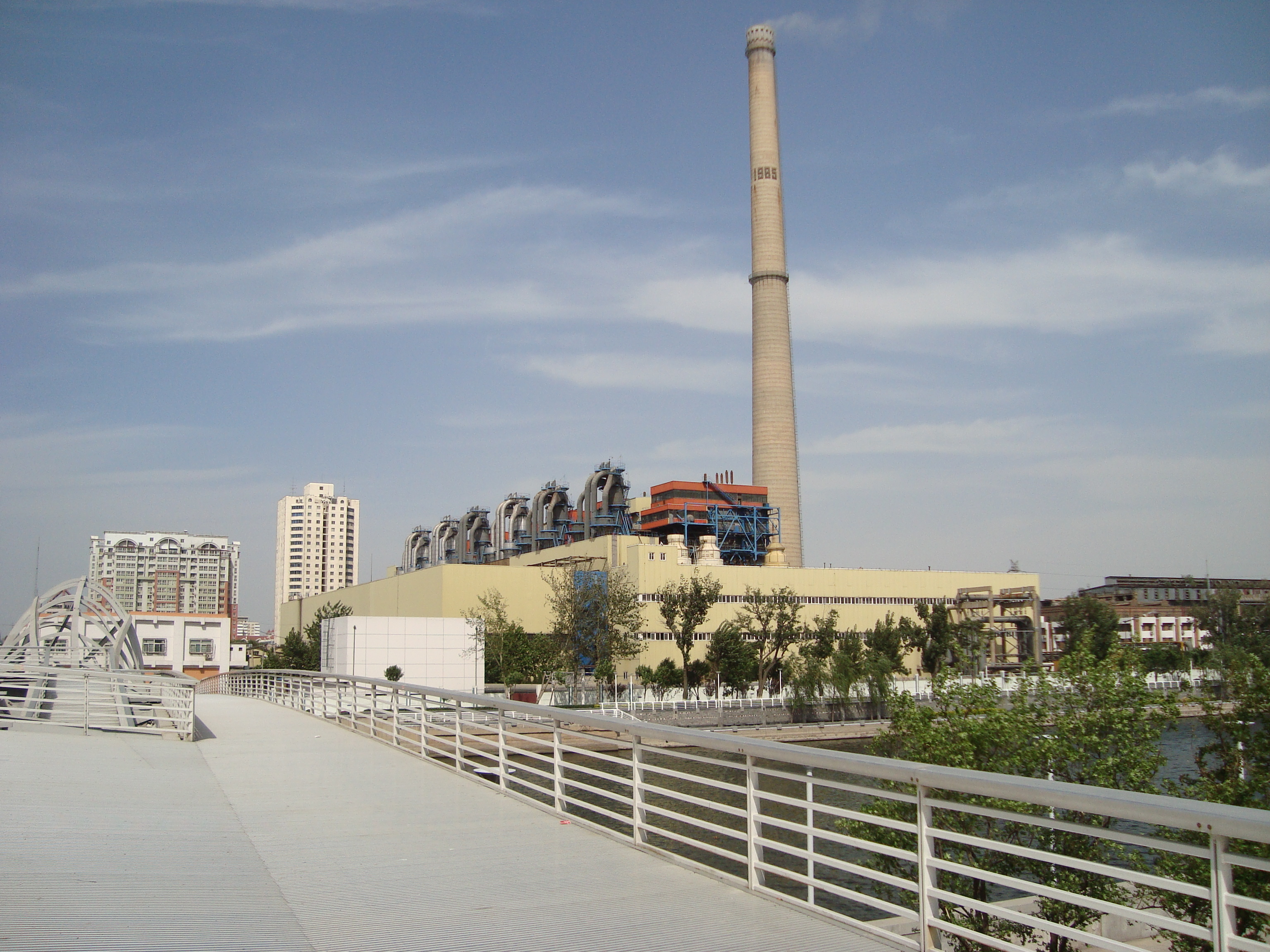
Factory along the Hai River, 2009

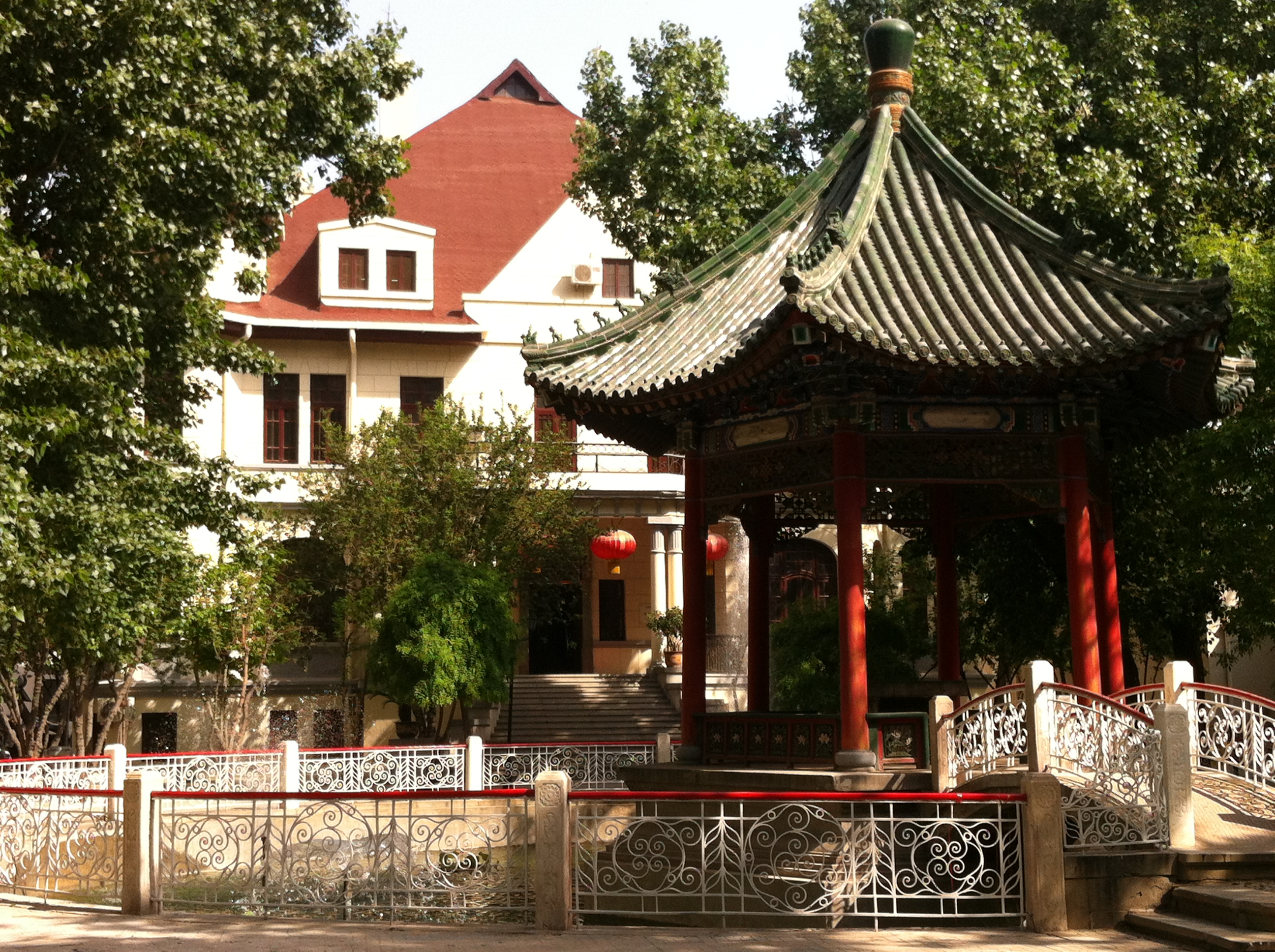
Former residence of Wang Zhilong, 2012

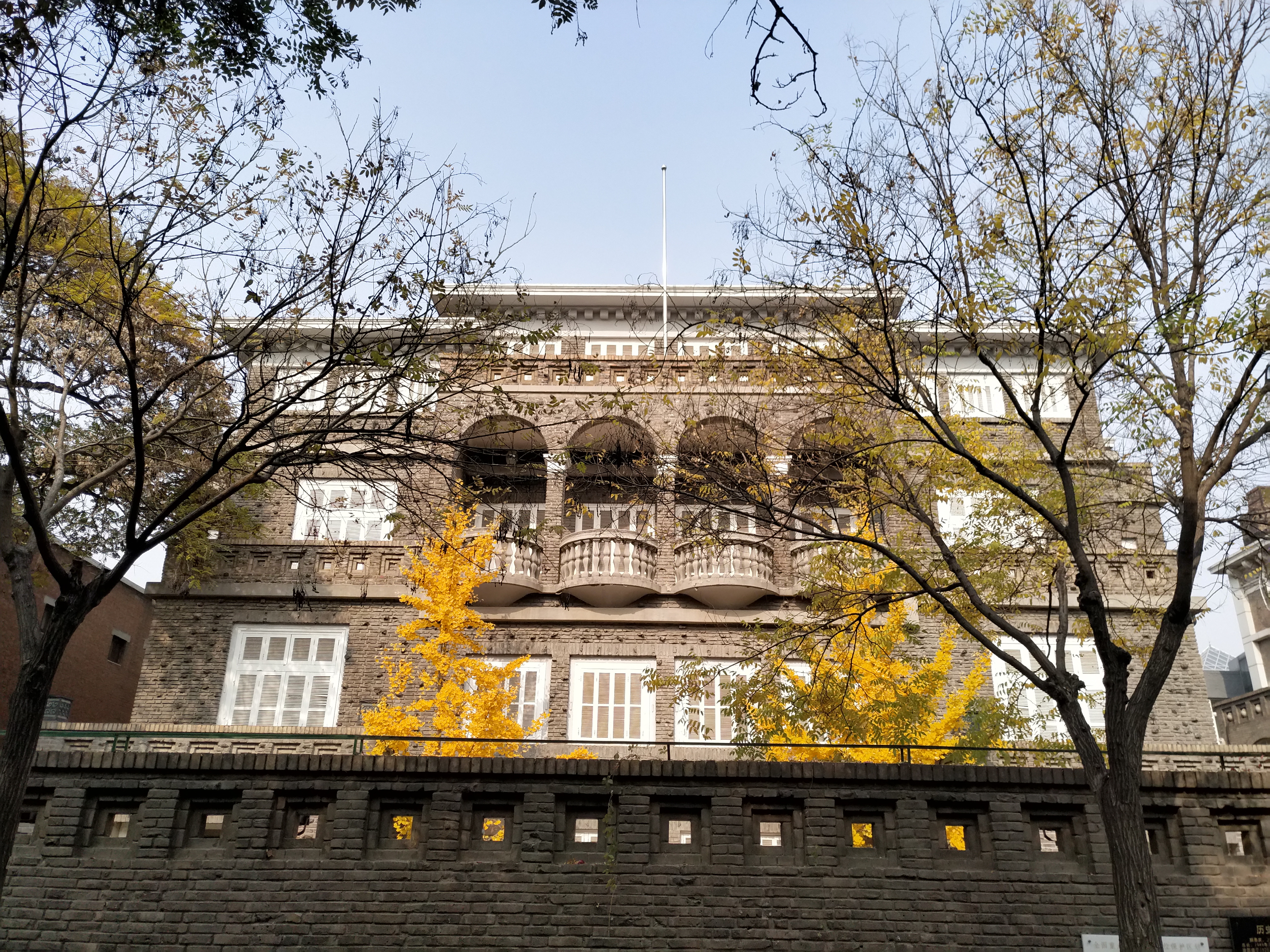
Building of the former Manchukuo Consulate, 2017
