= Tianjinbinguan station =

Metro station in Tianjin, China

Tianjinbinguan 天津宾馆
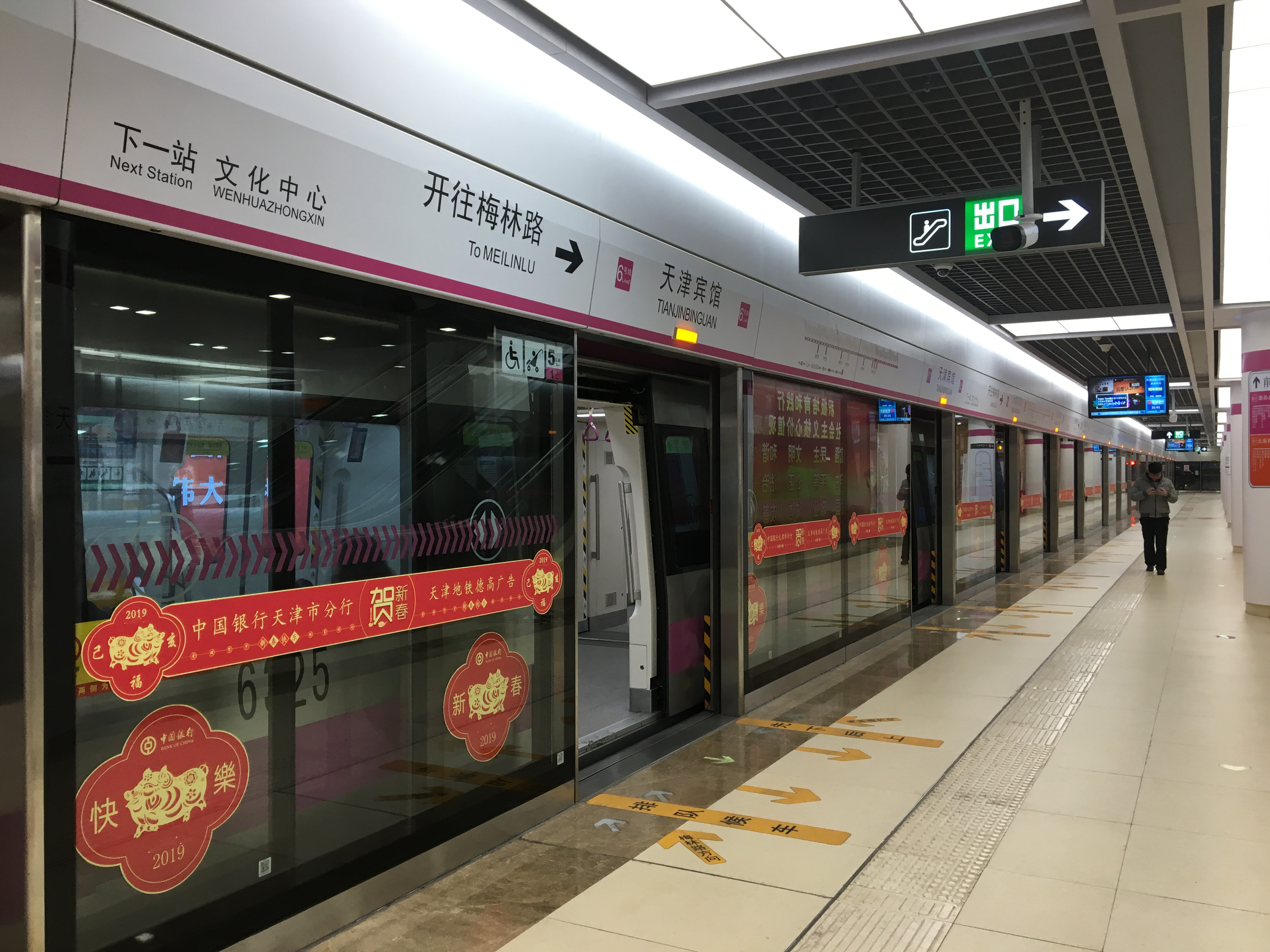
- Platform of Line 6

General information
- Location: Hexi District, Tianjin; China
- Operator: Tianjin Metro Co. Ltd.
- Lines: Line 5 Line 6
- Platforms: 4 (2 island platforms)

Construction
- Structure type: Underground

History
- Opened: 26 April 2018 (Line 6); 22 October 2018 (Line 5)

Services
Preceding station	Tianjin Metro	Following station
Wenhuazhongxin towards Beichenkejiyuanbei	Line 5	Zhongliuyiyuan towards Jinghuadongdao
Zhongliuyiyuan towards Nansunzhuang	Line 6	Wenhuazhongxin towards Lushuidao
Location

Tianjinbinguan station (Chinese: 天津宾馆站; pinyin: Tiānjīn Bīnguǎn zhàn; lit. 'Tianjin Hotel station') is an interchange station between Line 5 and Line 6 of Tianjin Metro in Tianjin, China, which opened in 2018.

== Station structure ==
A cross-platform interchange is provided between Line 5 and Line 6.

=== Platform layout ===
Island Platform on B2

	→	Urban rail transit in China	→	To Lushuidao
	Doors open on the right
To Liqizhuangnan	←	Urban rail transit in China	←

Island Platform on B3

To Nansunzhuang	←	Urban rail transit in China	←
	Doors open on the left
	→	Urban rail transit in China	→	To Beichenkejiyuanbei
