= Line 6 (Tianjin Metro) =

Metro line of Tianjin Metro

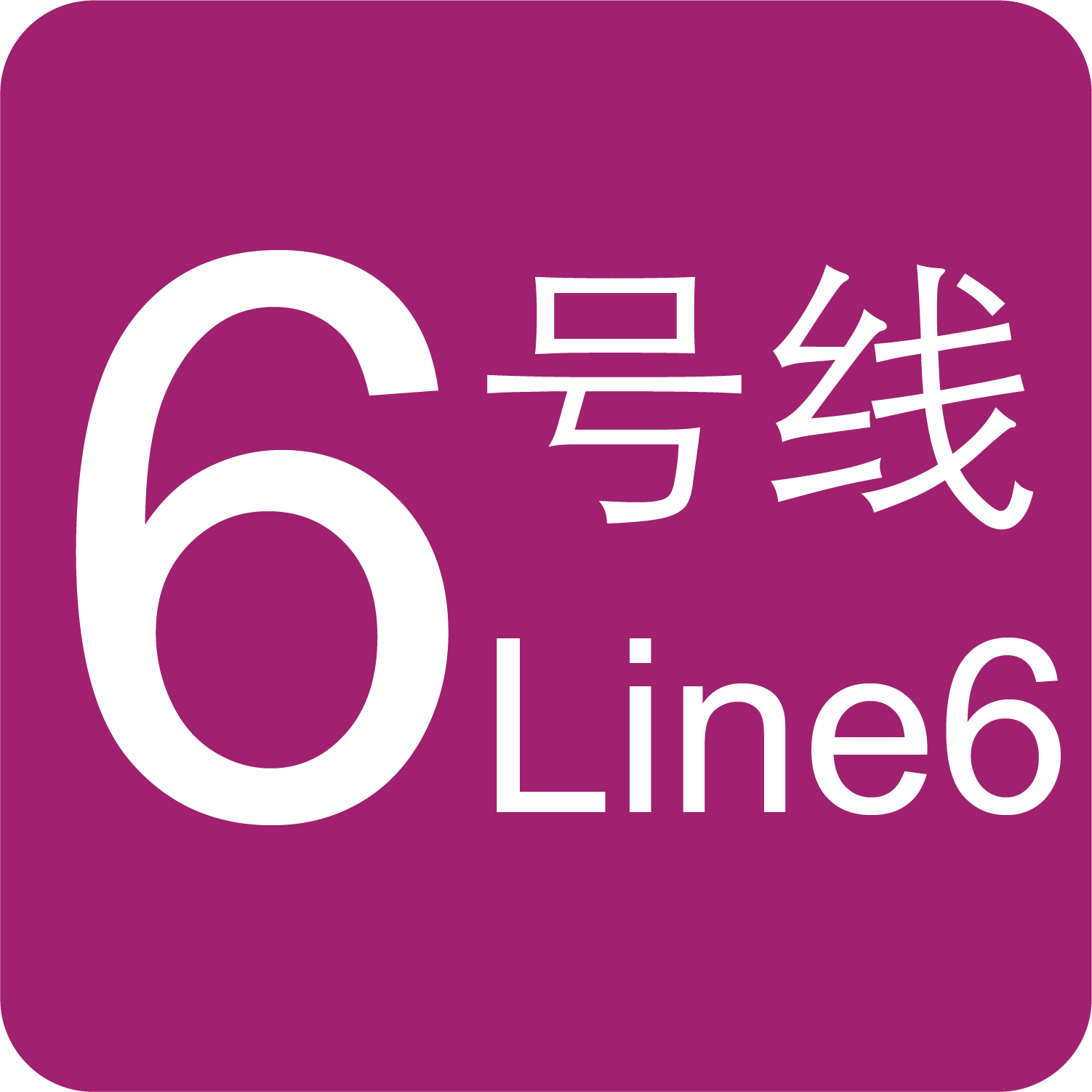

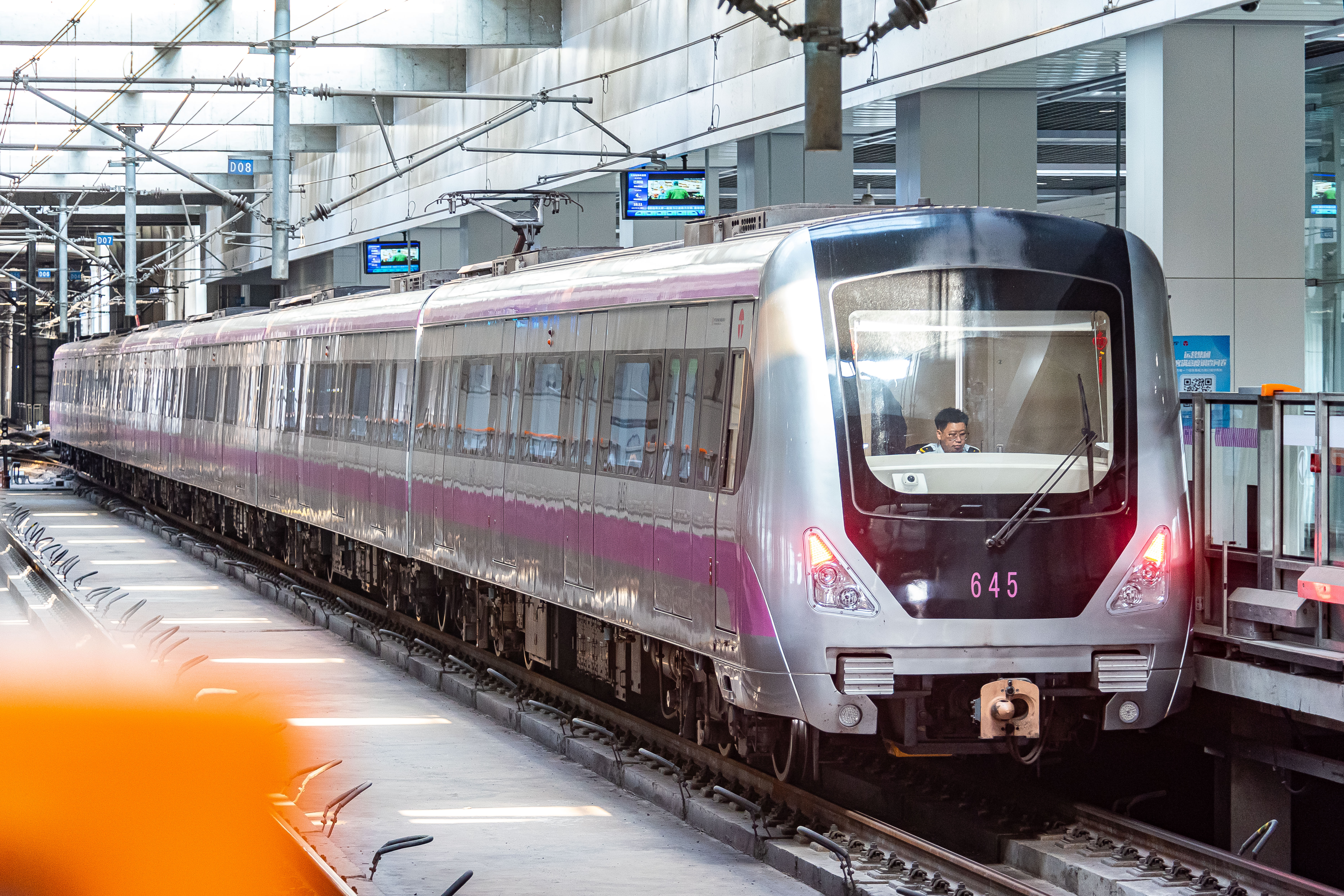
- Line 6 train at Nansunzhuang station

Overview
- Status: Operational
- Owner: Tianjin
- Locale: Tianjin, China
- Termini: Nansunzhuang; Lushuidao
- Stations: 39

Service
- Type: Rapid transit
- System: Tianjin Metro
- Services: 1
- Operator(s): Train Service Center II, Tianjin Rail Transit Group Corporation

History
- Opened: 6 August 2016; 10 years ago

Technical
- Line length: 43.6 km (27.09 mi)
- Num of tracks: 2
- Character: Underground, At-grade, & Elevated
- Track gauge: 1,435 mm (4 ft 8 1/2 in)

Line 6 of the Tianjin Metro (Chinese: 天津地铁六号线; pinyin: Tiānjīn Dìtiě Liù Hào Xiàn) is a rapid transit line running semi-circular from north-east to south-east Tianjin. It was opened on 6 August 2016. The line was later extended on 31 December 2016 and on 26 April 2018. The line is currently 42.6 km long and has 38 stations. The line currently uses 6 car B size trains but the platform is long enough to support 8 car trains as demand grows in the future. Line 6, together with Line 5 will form a loop around Tianjin.

== Opening timeline ==
Segment	Commencement	Length	Station(s)	Name
Changhonggongyuan — Nancuiping	6 August 2016	9.5 km (5.90 mi)	8	Phase 1 (1st section)
Nansunzhuang — Changhonggongyuan	31 December 2016	14.5 km (9.01 mi)	16	Phase 1 (2nd section)
Nancuiping — Meilinlu	26 April 2018	19 km (11.81 mi)	14	Phase 1 (3rd section)
Meilinlu — Lushuidao	28 December 2021	0.97 km (0.60 mi)	1	Phase 2 (excluding Line 8)

== Stations (northeast to southeast) ==
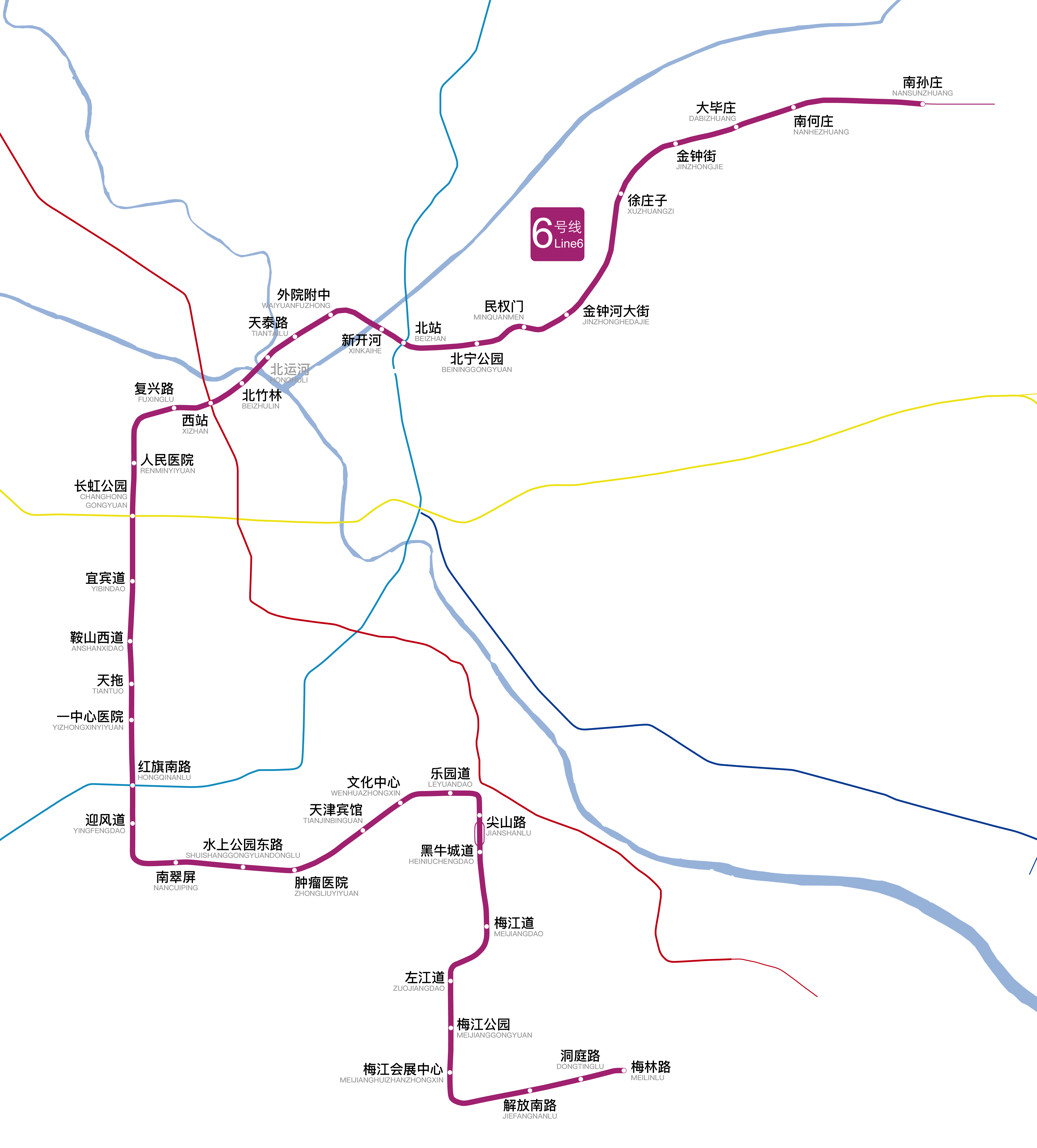
Line 6 drawn to scale.

Station name		Connections	Bus Connections	Distance km		Location
English	Chinese	Connections	Bus Connections	Distance km		Location
Nansunzhuang	南孙庄			-	0.00	Dongli
Nanhezhuang	南何庄		172 664 804	2.43	2.43	Dongli
Dabizhuang	大毕庄		172 664 804 通勤570	1.09	3.52	Dongli
Jinzhongjie	金钟街		172 379支线 701 715 715北线 804 通勤715	1.20	4.72	Dongli
Xuzhuangzi	徐庄子		142 172 195 198	1.45	6.17	Dongli
Jinzhonghedajie	金钟河大街	Tianjin Metro Line 5	146 147 172 195 570专线 602 633 701 702 715北线 868 870	2.45	8.62	Dongli / Hebei
Minquanmen	民权门		146 147 172 195 199 469 570专线 609 633 646 701 702 804 804快线 818 828 868 通勤570	0.92	9.54	Hebei
Beininggongyuan	北宁公园		1 1区间 27 340 469 609 619 622 641 646 656 670 671 675 702 813 818 869 901 903 908	0.94	10.48	Hebei
Beizhan	北站	TBP	1 1区间 27 469 609 619 622 641 646 670 671 702 813 818 869 901 903 908	1.33	11.81	Hebei
Xinkaihe	新开河			0.50	12.31	Hebei
Waiyuanfuzhong	外院附中		18 22 610 632 803 863 916	1.13	13.44	Hebei
Tiantailu	天泰路		34 146 147 150大圈 324 607 611 611快线 622 659 802 869 878 观光1	0.77	14.21	Hebei
Beiyunhe	北运河			0.75	14.96	Hebei
Beizhulin	北竹林		652北线	0.71	15.67	Hongqiao
Xizhan	西站	TXP	10 15 24 31 52 153 158 161 168 169 461 469 503 588 601 635 651 652北线 652快线 661 687 688 746 810 829 840 910 公墓定制专线6 通勤651	0.84	16.51	Hongqiao
Fuxinglu	复兴路		机场穿梭车 机场天津西站线	0.62	17.13	Hongqiao
Renminyiyuan	人民医院		47 47区间 48 48区间 52 192 634 669 672 676 705 800 836 837 841 856 860 861 879 907 911 961	1.54	18.67	Hongqiao
Changhonggongyuan	长虹公园	Tianjin Metro Line 2	47 47区间 48 48区间 52 191 192 645 645区间 673 686 841 858 867 879 903 911 通勤3 通学3	0.92	19.59	Nankai
Yibindao	宜宾道		47 47区间 48 48区间 52 191 192 646 700 842 867 879 903 911 通学9	1.20	20.79	Nankai
Anshanxidao	鞍山西道	Tianjin Metro Line 8	45 45新园村专线 47 47区间 48 48区间 50 52 191 192 193 609 646 662 681 687 700 700节假日 700晚高峰 700早高峰 829 850 851 867 879 903 911 专线678	1.13	21.92	Nankai
Tiantuo	天拖		45 45新园村专线 50 52 609 646 681 687 700 700节假日 700晚高峰 700早高峰 829 850 903 911 通学9	0.83	22.75	Nankai
Yizhongxinyiyuan	一中心医院		47 47区间 48 48区间 50 52 191 192 193 609 638 640 681 687 700 700节假日 700早高峰 829 847 849 850 866 903 911	0.65	23.40	Nankai
Hongqinanlu	红旗南路	Tianjin Metro Line 3	50 52 95 608 609 616 638 643 685 687 698 703 711 829 831 835 847 849 850 857 871 872 902 903 观光2 快速2 通勤616 通勤685 通勤872 通学8	1.20	24.60	Nankai
Yingfengdao	迎风道		50 588 616 643 703 711 829 847 857 871 902 903 904 快速2 通勤616 通勤快速1	0.69	25.29	Nankai
Nancuiping	南翠屏		12 52 162 301 608 685 835 901 963 快速1 快速2 通勤快速2	1.47	26.76	Nankai
Shuishanggongyuandonglu	水上公园东路		8 52 162 301 306 349 608 668 685 761 835 901 963 快速1 快速2	1.24	28.00	Nankai
Zhongliuyiyuan	肿瘤医院	Tianjin Metro Line 5 Tianjin Metro Line 7	8 13 511 608 619 668 682 685 697 704 835 901 963	0.98	28.98	Hexi
Tianjinbinguan	天津宾馆	Tianjin Metro Line 5	13 511 608 619 628 668 675 682 857 859 866 953	1.37	30.35	Hexi
Wenhuazhongxin	文化中心	Tianjin Metro Line 5 Tianjin Metro Line 11	511 529 606 619 636 641 655 662 675 682 800 803 826 838 857 859 866 906 912 953 通勤826 通勤838 通勤912	0.94	31.29	Hexi
Leyuandao	乐园道		48 529 604 606 619 632 655 657 682 698 803 857 859 866	0.93	32.22	Hexi
Jianshanlu	尖山路			0.87	33.09	Hexi
Yidaeryuan	医大二院	Tianjin Metro Line 11	20 96 96区间 604 628 632 655 657 665 686 698 800 846 快速1	0.64	33.73	Hexi
Meijiangdao	梅江道		20 337 604 632 662 753	1.35	35.08	Hexi
Zuojiangdao	左江道	(OSI via Youyinanlu)	96 96区间 323 529 612 615 636 704 705 753 838 906	1.44	36.52	Hexi
Meijianggongyuan	梅江公园		337 529 612 615 636 705 838 通勤838	0.77	37.29	Hexi / Xiqing
Meijianghuizhanzhongxin	梅江会展中心		337 612 615 636 705 838 848 通勤636	0.81	38.10	Hexi / Xiqing
Jiefangnanlu	解放南路		142 158 186 227 628 659 659区间 682 684 688 704	2.07	40.17	Hexi
Dongtinglu	洞庭路			1.03	41.20	Hexi
Meilinlu	梅林路		309 326北环 326南环 336 613 800 954	1.36	42.56	Hexi
Lushuidao	渌水道	Tianjin Metro Line 8		0.97	43.53	Hexi
Qishuidao	淇水道					Jinnan
Nanmaji	南马集					Jinnan
