= Zhigu =

Zhigu may refer to:

- Zhigu (1016–1055) or Emperor Xingzong of Liao
- Zhigu, a historical town in present-day Tianjin, China
- Zhigu station of the Tianjin Metro
