= Shuanggang station =

Shuanggang station may refer to:

- Shuanggang station (Guangzhou Metro), a station on Guangzhou Metro in Guangzhou, Guangdong.
- Shuanggang station (Nanchang Metro), a station on Line 1 of Nanchang Metro in Nanchang, Jiangxi.
- Shuanggang station (Tianjin Metro), a station on Line 8 of Tianjin Metro in Tianjin.
