= Shiyijing Road station =

Tianjin Metro station

Shiyijing Road 十一经路
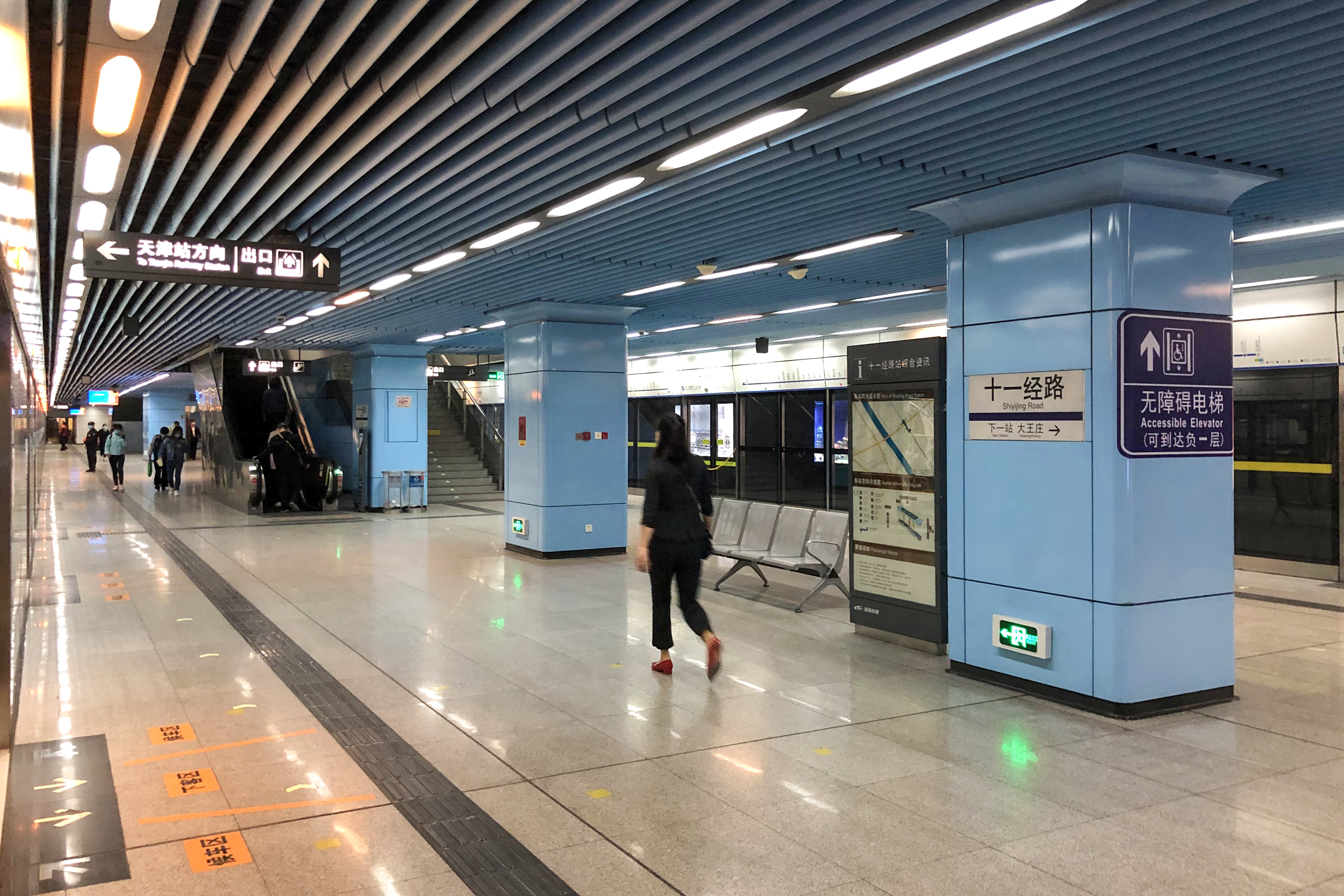

General information
- Location: Hedong District, Tianjin; China
- Coordinates: 39.1200°N 117.2180°E
- Operator: Binhai Mass Transit Co. Ltd.
- Line: Line 9

Construction
- Structure type: Underground

History
- Opened: 1 May 2011

Services
Preceding station	Tianjin Metro	Following station
Dawangzhuang towards Tianjinzhan	Line 9	Zhigu towards Donghailu
Location

Shiyijing Road Station (Chinese: 十一经路站), also known as Shiyijinglu Station, is a station of Line 9 of the Tianjin Metro. It started operations on 1 May 2011.
