= Liqizhuangnan station =

Metro station in Tianjin, China

Coordinates: 39°2′7.64689″N 117°9′51.03572″E

Liqizhuangnan 李七庄南
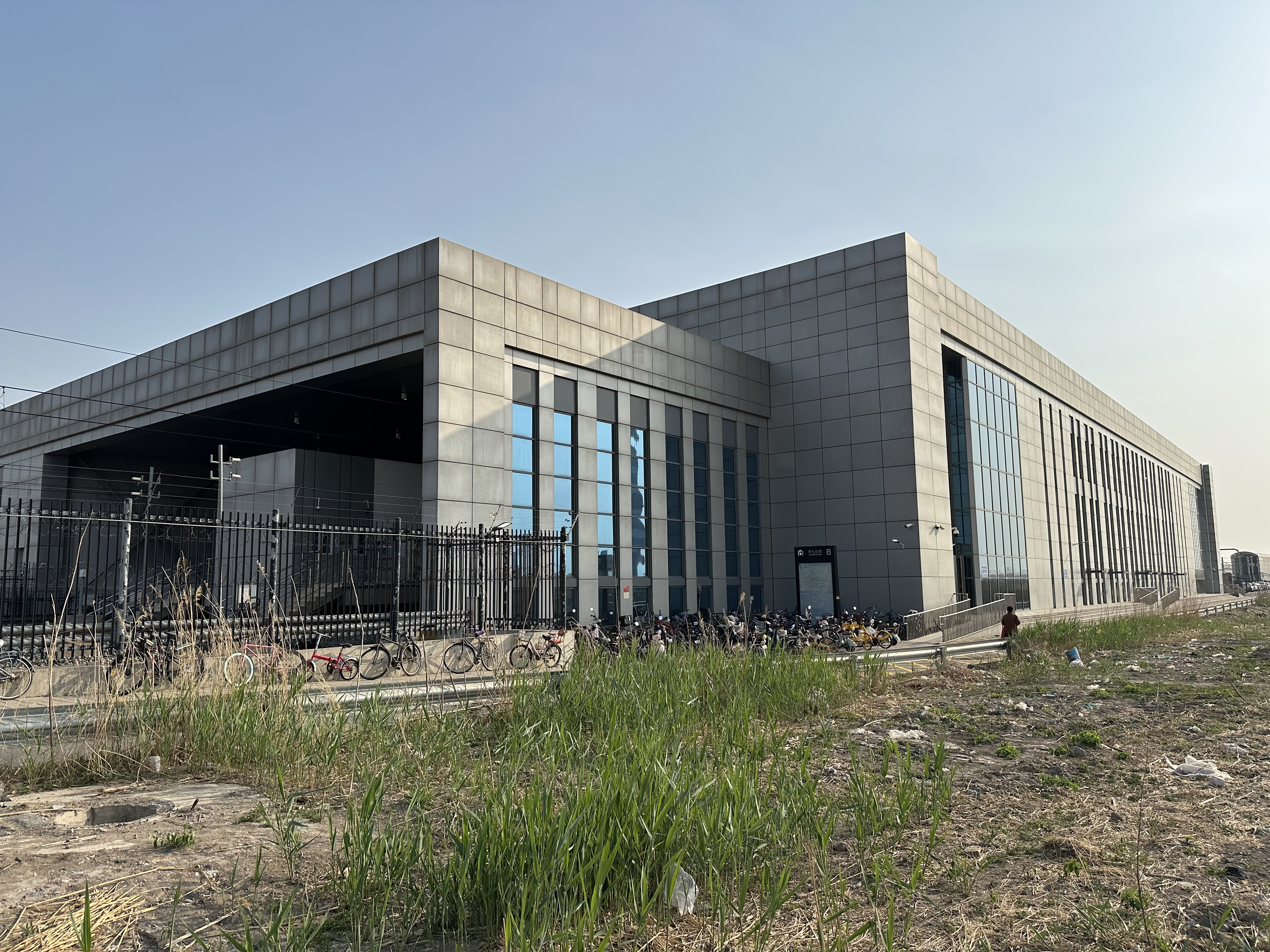
- Exterior

General information
- Location: Xiqing District, Tianjin; China
- Operated by: Tianjin Metro Co. Ltd.
- Line: Line 5

History
- Opened: 7 December 2021

Services
Preceding station	Tianjin Metro	Following station
Zhongyiyifuyuan towards Beichenkejiyuanbei	Line 5	Terminus
Location

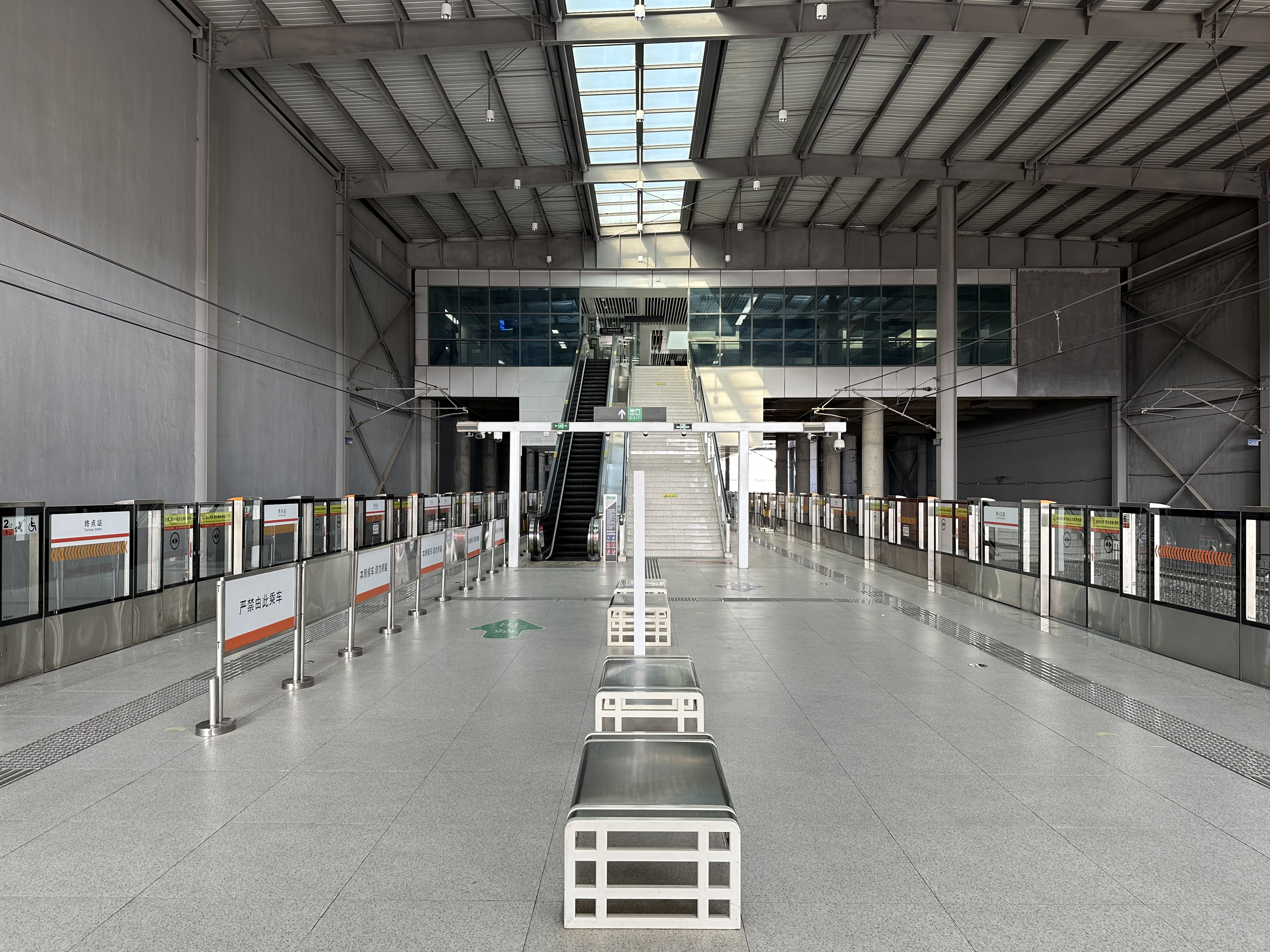
The platform of Liqizhuangnan Station

Liqizhuangnan station (Chinese: 李七庄南站; lit. 'Liqizhuang South station') is a station of Line 5 of the Tianjin Metro. It started operations on 7 December 2021.
