= Line 5 (Tianjin Metro) =

Metro line of Tianjin Metro

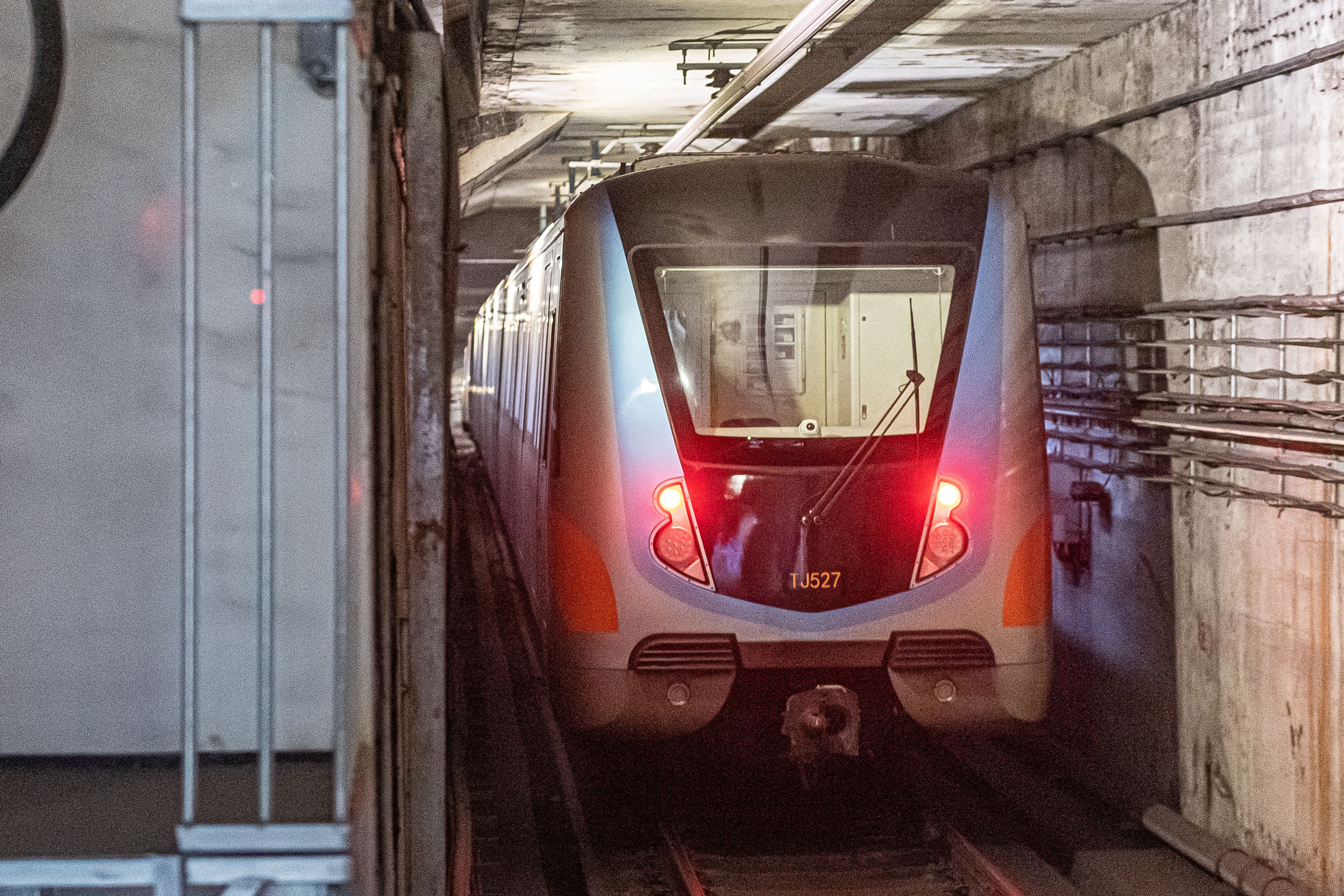
- Line 5 train leaving Wenhuazhongxin station

Overview
- Status: Operational
- Owner: Tianjin
- Locale: Tianjin, China
- Termini: Beichenkejiyuanbei; Jinghuadongdao
- Stations: 29

Service
- Type: Rapid transit
- System: Tianjin Metro
- Services: 1
- Operator(s): Train Service Center III, Tianjin Rail Transit Group Corporation
- Depot(s): Shuangjie, Liyuantou
- Rolling stock: CRRC Tangshan Type B

History
- Opened: 22 October 2018; 8 years ago

Technical
- Line length: 36.1 km (22.43 mi)
- Num of tracks: 2
- Character: Underground, At-grade, & Elevated
- Track gauge: 1,435 mm (4 ft 8 1/2 in)
- Electrification: Overhead line with 1,500 V DC

Line 5 of the Tianjin Metro (Chinese: 天津地铁5号线; pinyin: Tiānjīn Dìtiě Wǔ Hào Xiàn) is a rapid transit line running semi-circular from north-west to south-west Tianjin. It is run by Tianjin Binhai Mass Transit Development Co., Ltd, which becomes a subsidiary of Tianjin Rail Transit Group Corporation since 2017.

The line is 36.1 km in length and has 29 stations. Beichenkejiyuanbei is half-underground. Liqizhuangnan is at-grade. All other stations are underground. The line uses 6 car B size trains. Line 5, together with Line 6 forms a loop around Tianjin.

== Opening timeline ==
On 22 October 2018, the section from Danhebeidao to Zhongyiyifuyuan (26 stations) became operational. On 31 January 2019, the line was extended one station to Beichenkejiyuanbei. On 7 December 2021, the line was extended one station to Liqizhuangnan.

Segment	Commencement	Length	Station(s)	Name
Danhebeidao — Zhongyiyifuyuan	22 October 2018	34.8 km	26	(initial section)
Beichenkejiyuanbei — Danhebeidao	31 January 2019	34.8 km	1	one-station extension
Zhongyiyifuyuan — Liqizhuangnan	7 December 2021	34.8 km	1	one-station extension
Liqizhuangnan — Jinghuadongdao	28 September 2024	1.3 km	1	one-station extension

== Stations (northwest to southwest) ==
Station name		Connections	Bus Connections	Distance km	Location
English	Chinese	Connections	Bus Connections	Distance km	Location
Beichenkejiyuanbei	北辰科技园北				Beichen
Danhebeidao	丹河北道				Beichen
Beichendao	北辰道		764 850 909		Beichen
Zhiyedaxue	职业大学				Beichen
Huaihedao	淮河道		27 334 343 733 740 743 803 811 812 813 910		Beichen
Liaohebeidao	辽河北道		733 743 803 811 812 813 910		Beichen
Yixingfubei	宜兴埠北		150 160 182 195 619 641 670 671 675 733 749 811 812 908		Beichen
Zhangxingzhuang	张兴庄	Tianjin Metro Line 3	675 852		Beichen
Zhichenglu	志成路		675		Hebei
Siyuanlu	思源路				Hebei
Jianchangdao	建昌道		1 602 633 679 869		Hebei
Jinzhonghedajie	金钟河大街	Tianjin Metro Line 6	602 633 646 679 701 702 804 868 870		Dongli / Hebei
Yueyahe	月牙河		15 353 602 608 609 679 902 911		Hebei
Xingfugongyuan	幸福公园		22 315 602 608 842		Hebei
Jingjianglu	靖江路	Tianjin Metro Line 2	32 35 327 353 602 622 635 660 663 689 861 907		Hedong
Chenglindao	成林道	Tianjin Metro Line 4	30 35 42 47 47区 48 48区 353 516 608 639 640 656 665 666 681 827 836 847 856 866 905 912 916 963		Hedong
Jintanglu	津塘路		28 185 511 608 621 643 656 665 676 806 847 856 862 905 962		Hedong
Zhigu	直沽	Tianjin Metro Line 9	92 359 511 608 665 668 678 760 840 860 962		Hedong
Xiawafang	下瓦房	Tianjin Metro Line 1 Tianjin Metro Line 8	3 20 175 186 369 511 608 631 641 652快线 659 659区间 665 668 685 688 760 846 860 867 868 962 963 通勤665 专线678		Hexi
Xi'nanlou	西南楼		47 47区 48 48区 95 175 529 604 606 619 632 657 682 697 698 803 835 855 857 866 872 908 953 954 963		Hexi
Wenhuazhongxin	文化中心	Tianjin Metro Line 6 Tianjin Metro Line 11	511 529 606 619 636 641 655 662 675 682 800 803 826 838 857 859 866 906 912 953 通勤826 通勤838 通勤912		Hexi
Tianjinbinguan	天津宾馆	Tianjin Metro Line 6	13 511 608 619 628 668 675 682 857 859 866 953		Hexi
Zhongliuyiyuan	肿瘤医院	Tianjin Metro Line 6 Tianjin Metro Line 7	8 13 511 608 619 668 682 685 697 704 835 901 963		Hexi
Tiyuzhongxin	体育中心		8 52 162 301 306 349 761		Nankai
Lingbinlu	凌宾路		870		Nankai
Changlinglu	昌凌路	Tianjin Metro Line 10	349 712 713 753 953		Xiqing
Zhongyiyifuyuan	中医一附院		713 753		Xiqing
Liqizhuangnan	李七庄南				Xiqing
Jinghuadongdao	京华东道	Jinjing line			Xiqing
Through train to Tuanboyixueyuan.
