= Lushuidao station =

Metro station in Tianjin, China

Lushuidao 渌水道
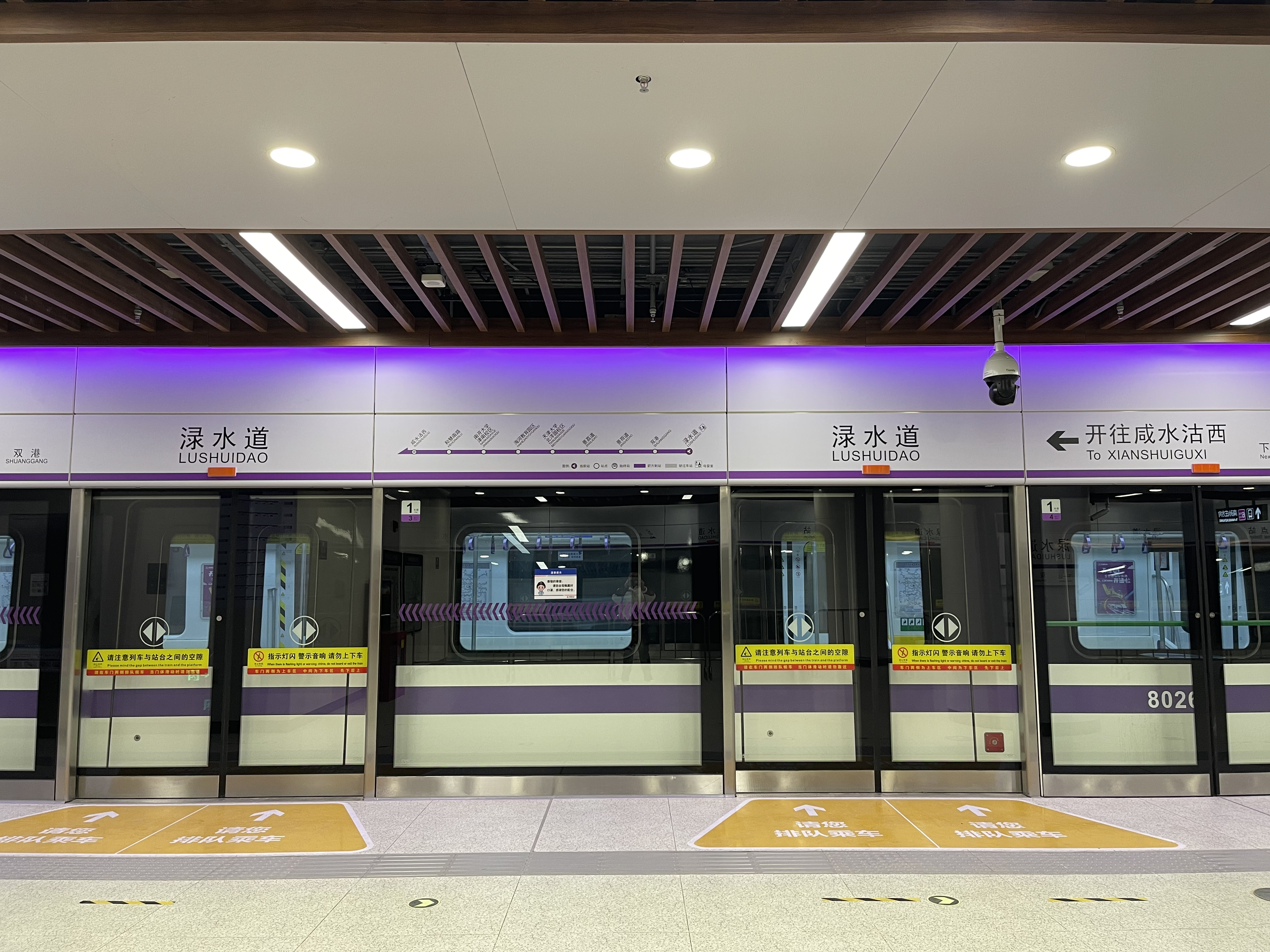
- Platform of Line 8

General information
- Location: Hexi District, Tianjin; China
- Operated by: Tianjin Metro Co. Ltd.
- Lines: Line 6 Line 8
- Platforms: 4 (2 island platforms)

Construction
- Structure type: Underground

History
- Opened: 28 December 2021

Services
Preceding station	Tianjin Metro	Following station
Meilinlu towards Nansunzhuang	Line 6	Terminus
Terminus	Line 8	Shuanggang towards Xianshuiguxi
Location

Lushuidao station (Chinese: 渌水道站; pinyin: Lùshuǐ Dào zhàn) is an interchange station between Line 6 and Line 8 (currently known as Phase II of Line 6) of Tianjin Metro in Tianjin, China, which opened on 28 December 2021.

== Station structure ==
B1; Concourse	Exits, Customer service, Vending machines
B2; Platforms	Line 8 termination platform
B2; Platforms	Island platform
B2; Platforms	Line 8 to Xianshuiguxi (Shuanggang)
B3; Platforms	Line 6 to Nansunzhuang (Meilinlu)
B3; Platforms	Island platform
B3; Platforms	Line 6 reserved platform
