= Nansunzhuang station =

Metro station in Tianjin, China

Nansunzhuang 南孙庄
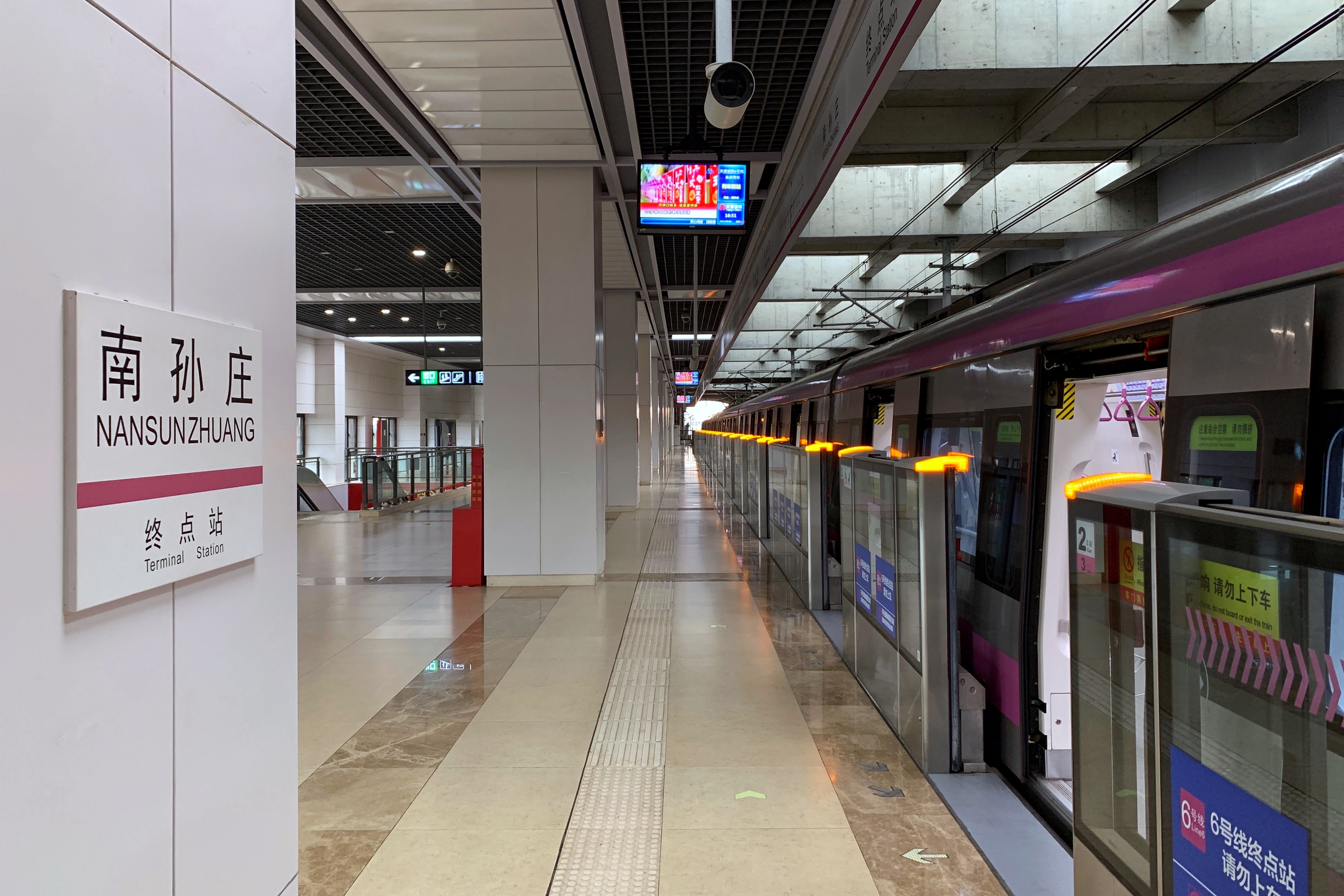
- Platform of Line 6

General information
- Location: Dongli District, Tianjin; China
- Coordinates: 39.2054°N 117.3120°E
- Operated by: Tianjin Metro Co. Ltd.
- Line: Line 6
- Platforms: 2 side platforms

Construction
- Structure type: Elevated

History
- Opened: 31 December 2016

Services
| Preceding station | Tianjin Metro | Following station |
|---|---|---|
| Terminus | Line 6 | Nanhezhuang towards Lushuidao |
Location

Nansunzhuang station (Chinese: 南孙庄站; pinyin: Nánsūnzhuāng zhàn) is a station on Line 6 of Tianjin Metro in Tianjin, China, which opened in 2016.
