= Line 8 (Tianjin Metro) =

Rapid transit line of Tianjin Metro

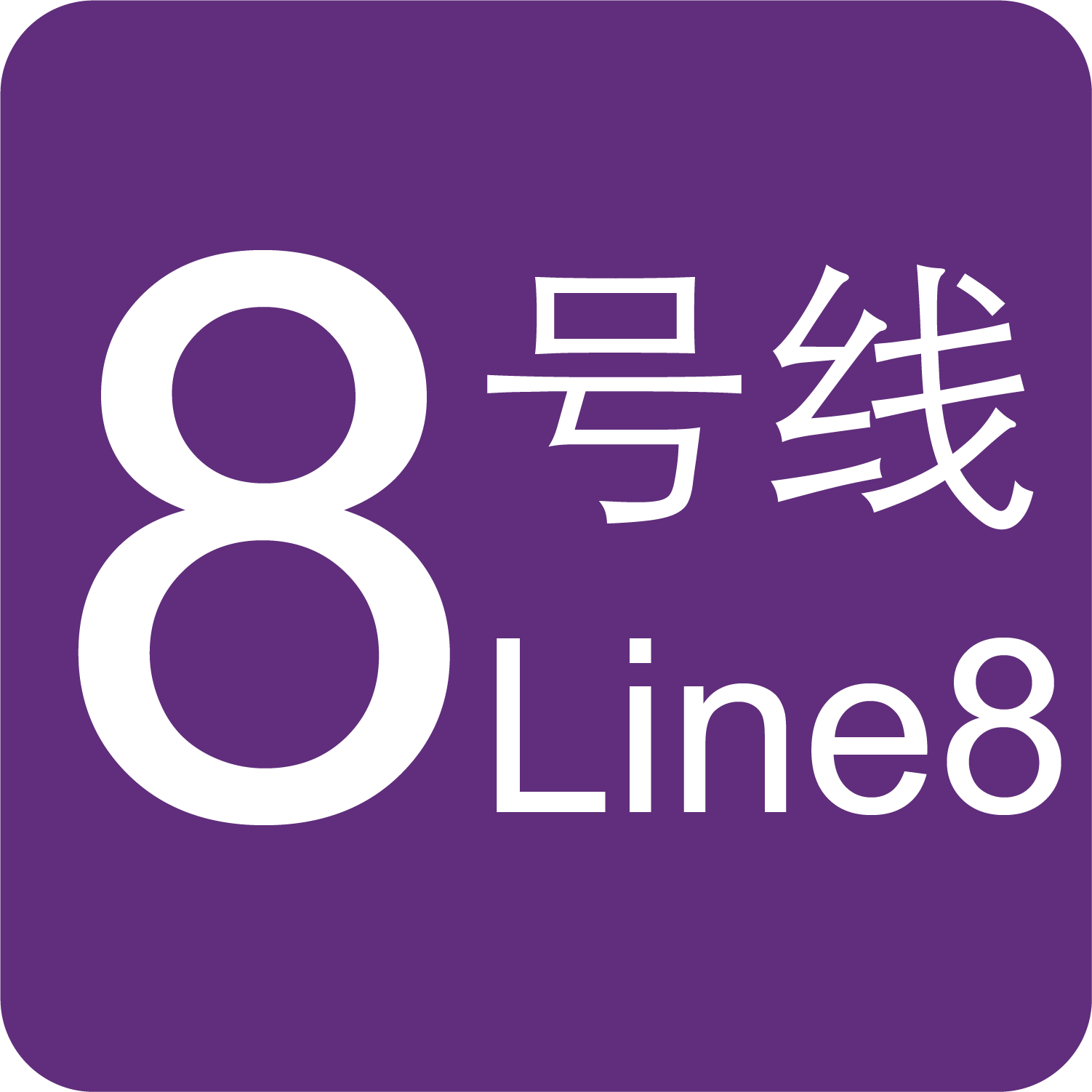

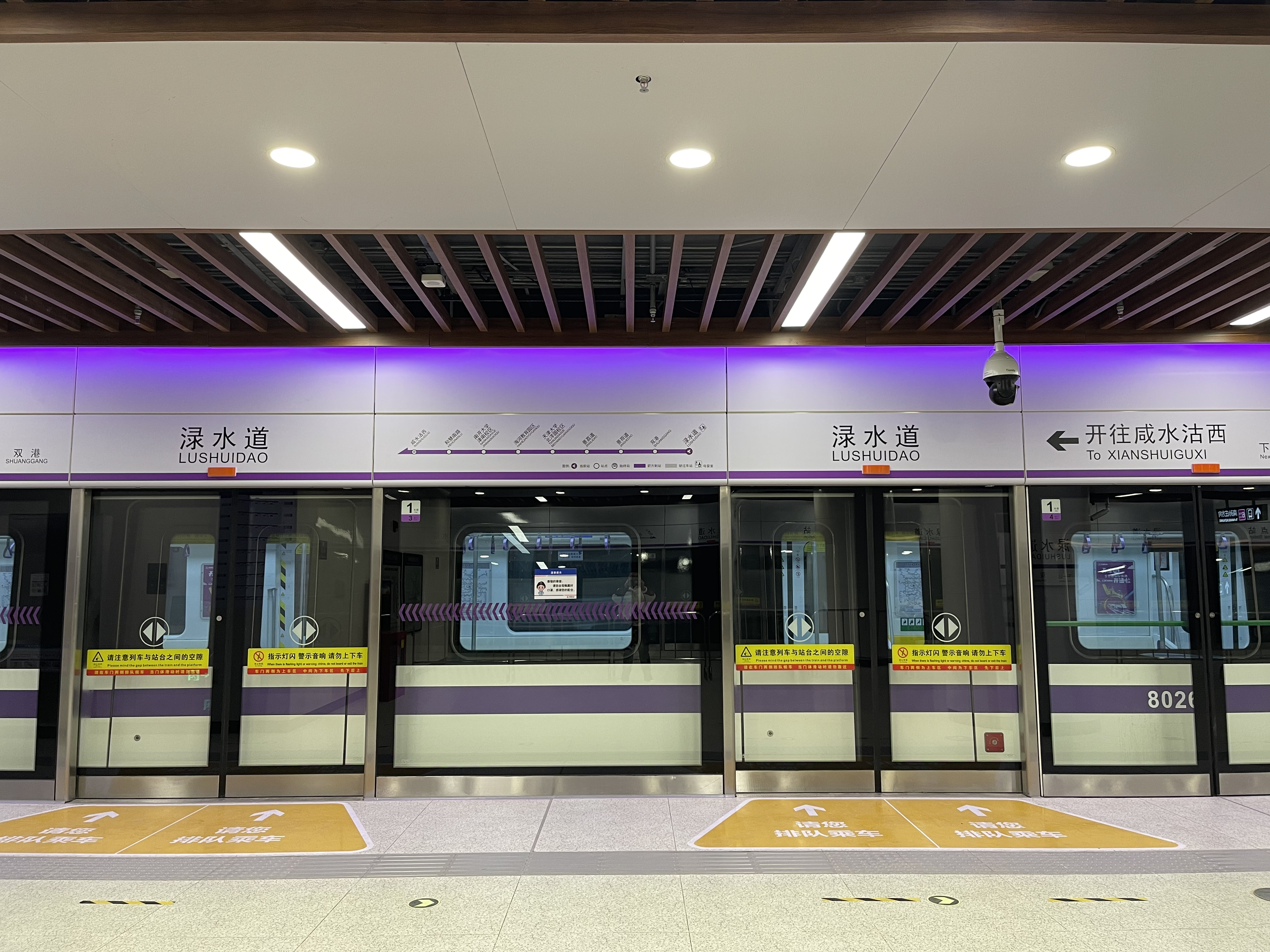
- Lushuidao station

Overview
- Status: Operational
- Owner: Tianjin
- Locale: Tianjin, China
- Termini: Lushuidao; Xianshuiguxi
- Stations: 9

Service
- Type: Rapid transit
- System: Tianjin Metro
- Services: 1
- Operator: CRCC association

History
- Opened: 28 December 2021; 4 years ago

Technical
- Line length: 13.42 km (8.34 mi)
- Num of tracks: 2
- Character: Underground
- Track gauge: 1,435 mm (4 ft 8 1/2 in)
- Electrification: 1500 V DC Overhead lines

Line 8 of the Tianjin Metro (Chinese: 天津地铁8号线; pinyin: Tiānjīn Dìtiě Bā Hào Xiàn) is a rapid transit line running from northwest to southeast Tianjin. The Phase I south section of line 8, which was originally called Line 6 Phase 2 during construction, was opened on 28 December 2021. The line is currently 13.42 km long and has 9 stations.

This is the first metro line in Tianjin that uses Type A six car, GoA4 automated trains.

== Opening timeline ==
Segment	Commencement	Length	Station(s)	Name
Lushuidao — Xianshuiguxi	28 December 2021	13.42 km (8.34 mi)	9	Line 6 Phase 2 (1st section of Line 8)
Lushuidao — Xianshuiguxi	9 January 2022	Temporary ceased operation due to COVID-19 pandemic		
Lushuidao — Hehuinanlu (except Shuanggang)	27 January 2022	service resumed		
Shuanggang	30 January 2022	service resumed		
Xianshuiguxi	31 January 2022	service resumed		

== Stations (northwest to southeast) ==
Station name		Connections	Bus Connections	Distance km	Location
English	Chinese	Connections	Bus Connections	Distance km	Location
Zhongbei	中北				Nankai
Fujianglu	福姜路				Nankai
Nanniwanlu	南泥湾路				Nankai
Leshandao	乐山道				Nankai
Lüshuigongyuan	绿水公园				Nankai
Lanpinglu	兰坪路				Nankai
Anshanxidao	鞍山西道	Tianjin Metro Line 6			Nankai
Nanfenglu	南丰路				Nankai
Tianjindaxueliulitai	天津大学六里台	Tianjin Metro Line 7			Nankai
Xikanglu	西康路	Tianjin Metro Line 3			Heping
Chengdudao	成都道				Heping
Machangdao	马场道				Hexi
Renmingongyuan	人民公园				Hexi
Xiawafang	下瓦房	Tianjin Metro Line 1 Tianjin Metro Line 5			Hexi
Xiangjiangdao	湘江道				Hexi
Tucheng	土城	Tianjin Metro Line 1			Hexi
Lishuidao	澧水道	Tianjin Metro Line 11			Hexi
Meijiangdaodong	梅江道东				Hexi
Nanzhuqiao	南珠桥	Tianjin Metro Line 10			Hexi
Yishanlu	沂山路				Jinnan
Changtaihedong	长泰河东				Hexi
Lushuidao	渌水道	Tianjin Metro Line 6	304 613 753		Jinnan
Shuanggang	双港		215 304 613		Jinnan
Jinghedao	景荷道				Jinnan
Jinglidao	景荔道				Jinnan
Tianjindaxuebeiyangyuanxiaoqu	天津大学北洋园校区		205 214区间 216 612		Jinnan
Haihejiaoyuyuanqu	海河教育园区		205 214区间 216 612		Jinnan
Nankaidaxuejinnanxiaoqu	南开大学津南校区		131		Jinnan
Hehuinanlu	和慧南路				Jinnan
Xianshuiguxi	咸水沽西		219 226西线 930		Jinnan
