= Zhigu station =

Metro station in Tianjin, China

Coordinates: 39.1100°N 117.2276°E

Zhigu 直沽
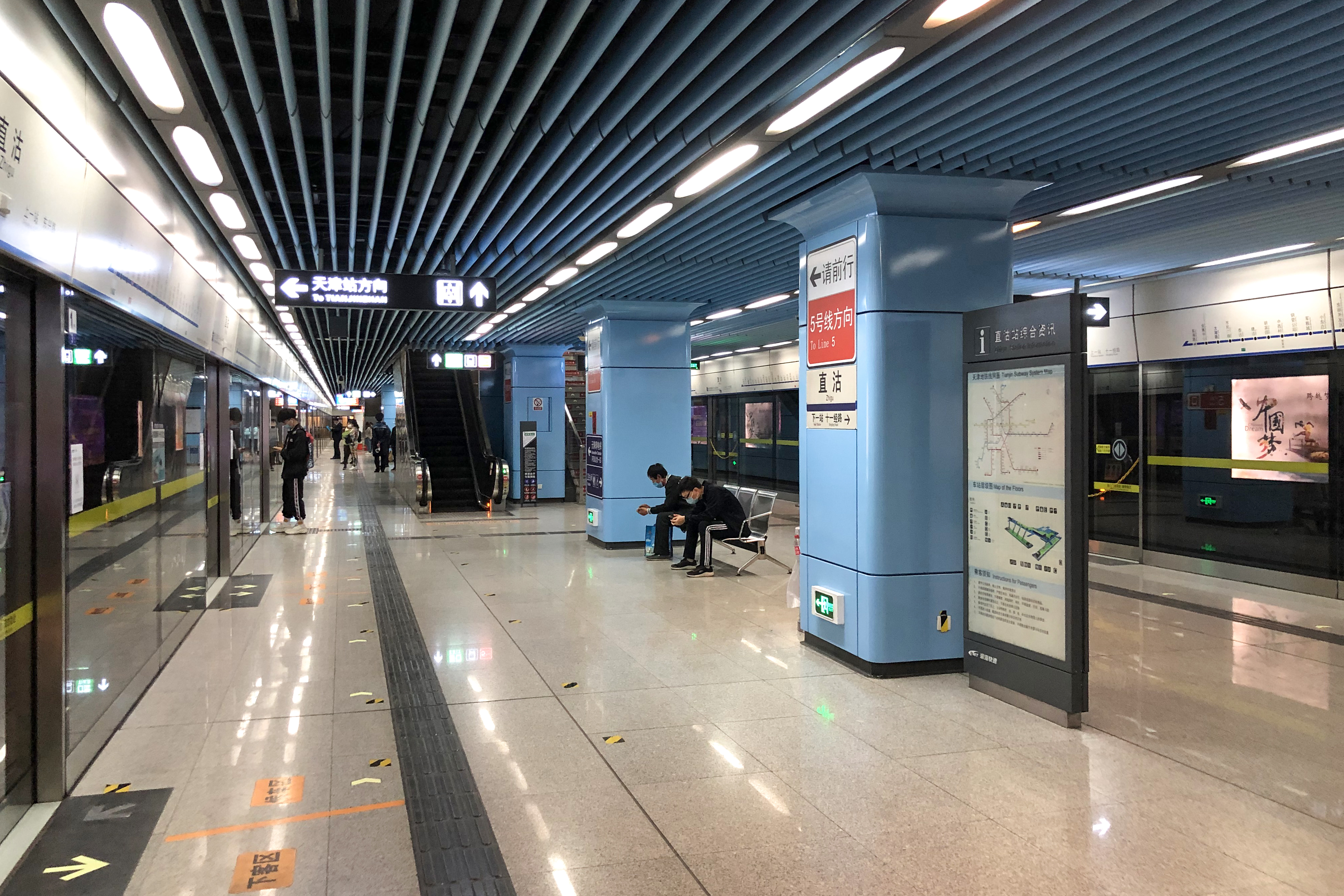
- Line 9 platform

General information
- Location: Hedong District, Tianjin; China
- Operated by: Binhai Mass Transit Co. Ltd. (Line 9); Tianjin Metro Co. Ltd. (Line 5)
- Lines: Line 5 Line 9

Construction
- Structure type: Underground

History
- Opened: 1 May 2011 (Line 9); 22 October 2018 (Line 5)

Services
Preceding station	Tianjin Metro	Following station
Jintanglu towards Beichenkejiyuanbei	Line 5	Xiawafang towards Jinghuadongdao
Shiyijinglu towards Tianjinzhan	Line 9	Dongxinglu towards Donghailu
Location

Zhigu Station (Chinese: 直沽站) is a station of Line 5 and Line 9 of the Tianjin Metro. It started operations on 1 May 2011.
