= Tianjin =

Municipality of China

Tianjin 天津 Tienchin, Tientsin
- Municipality
- Tianjin Municipality
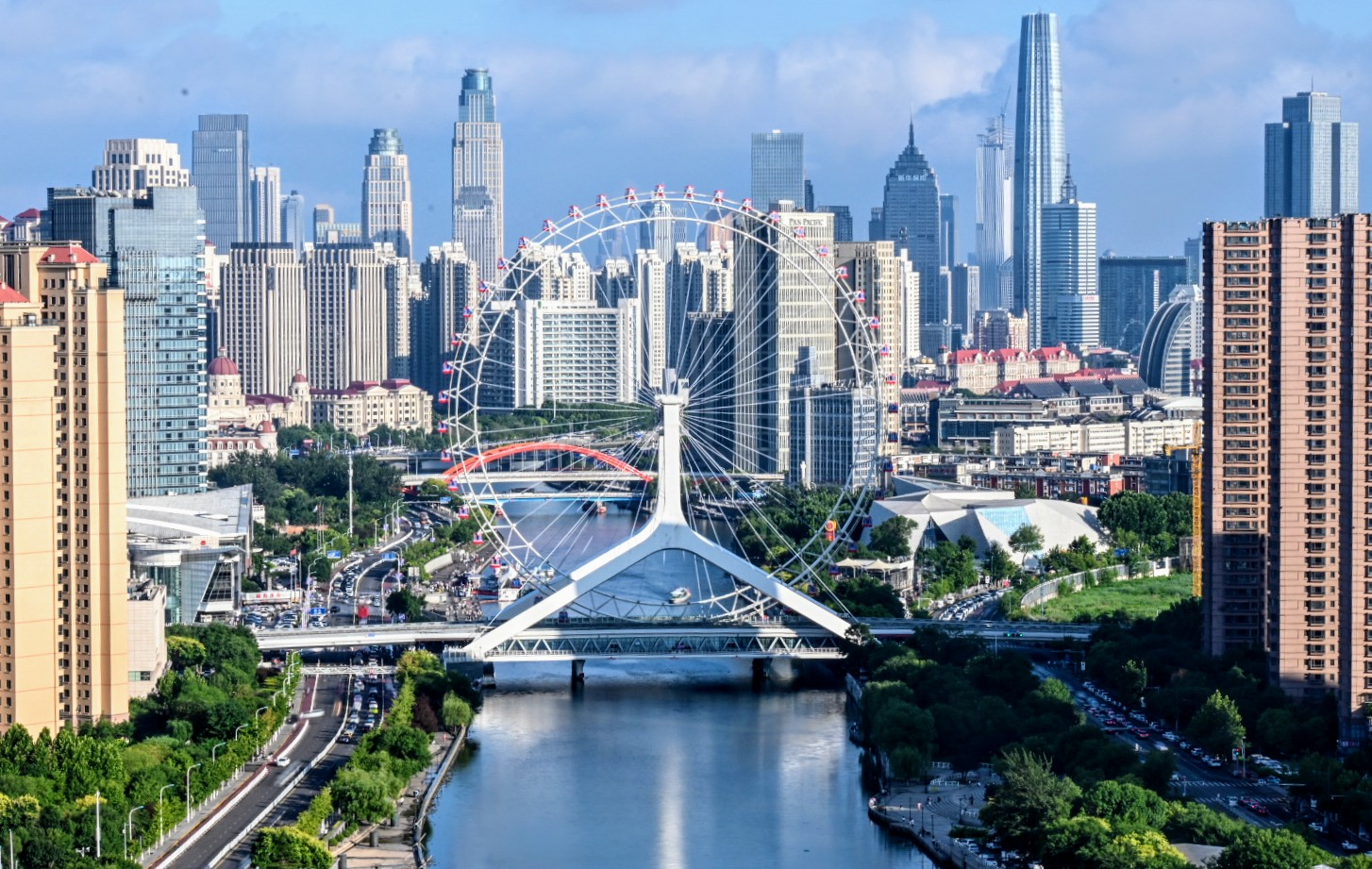
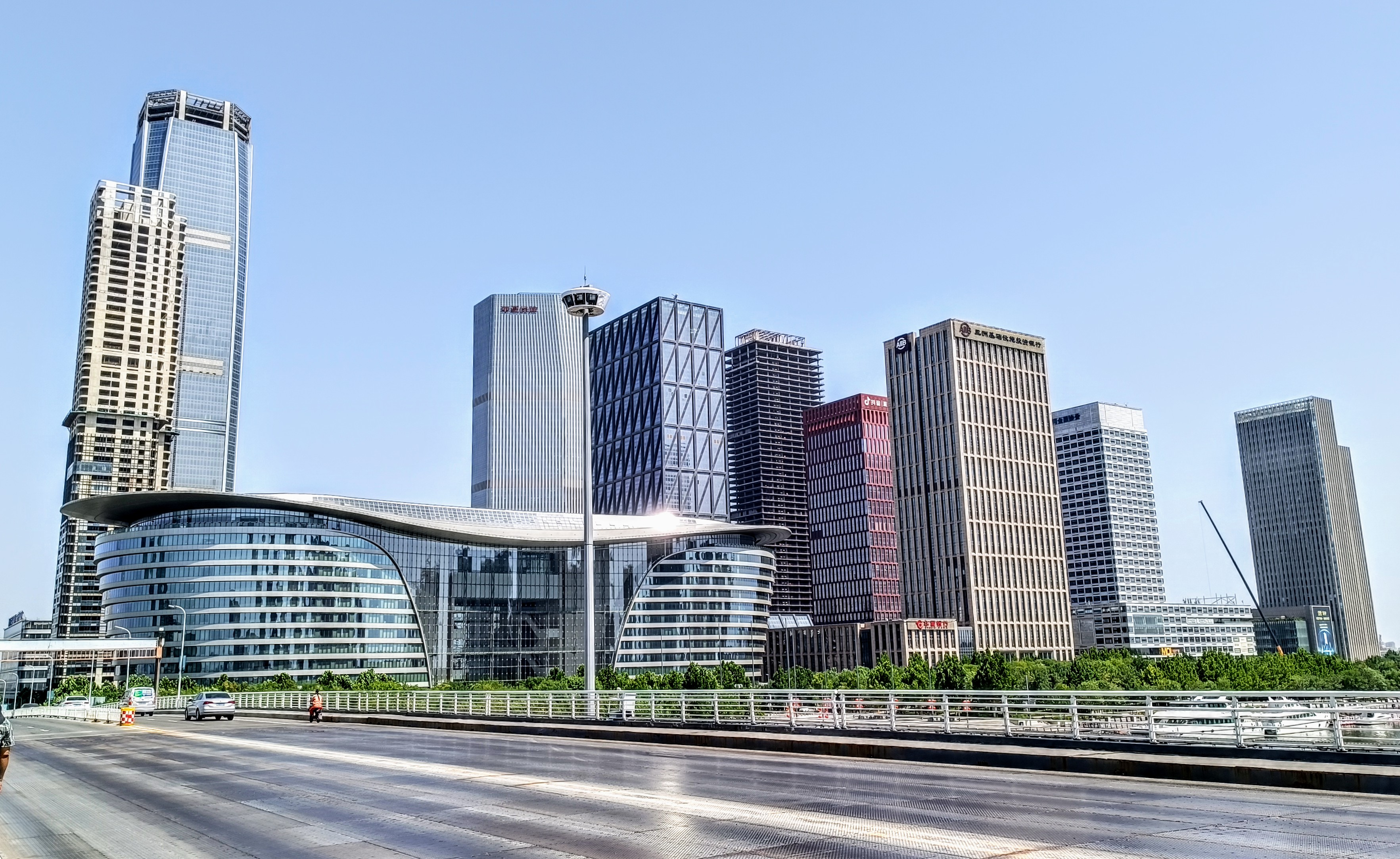
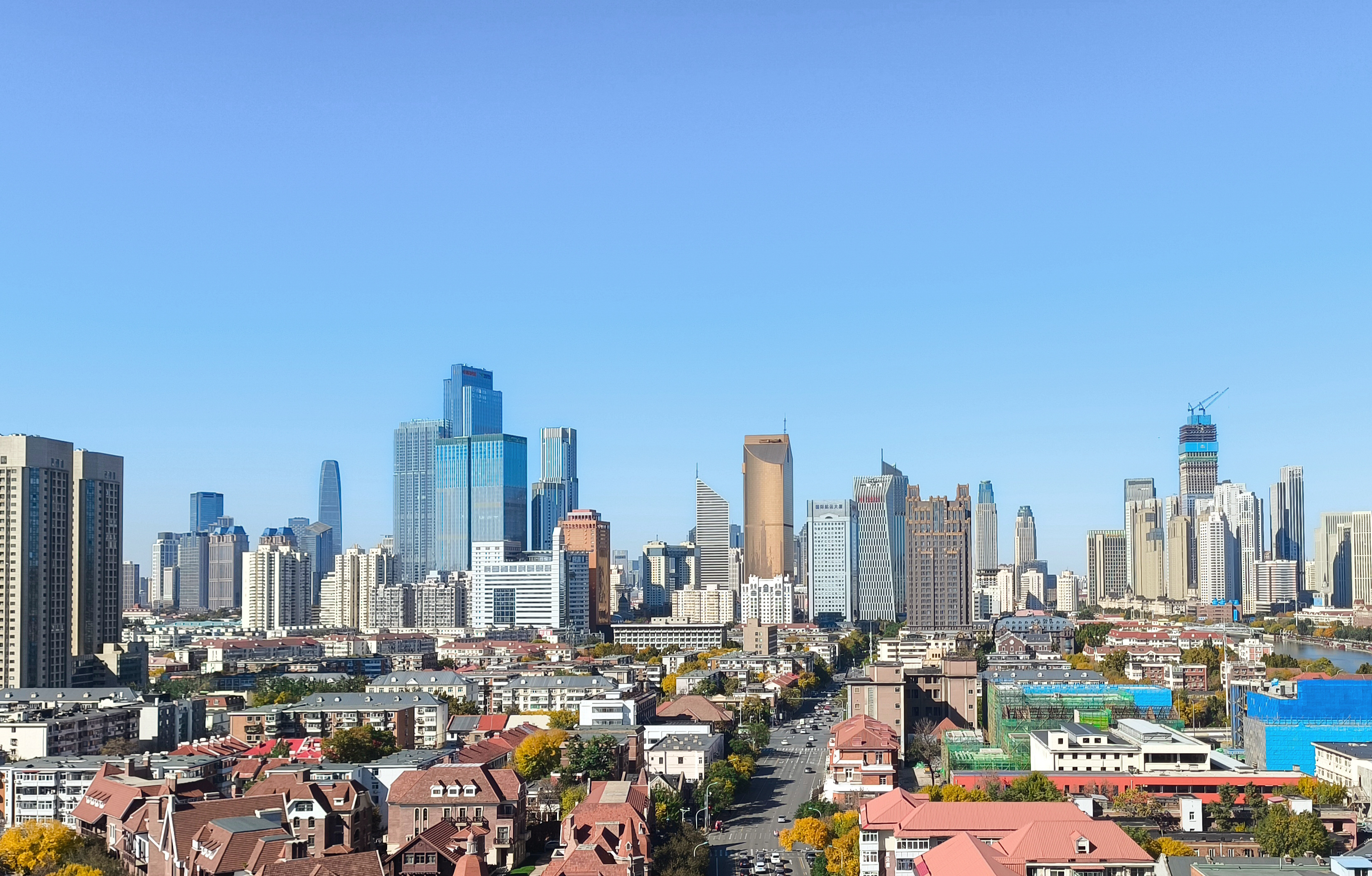
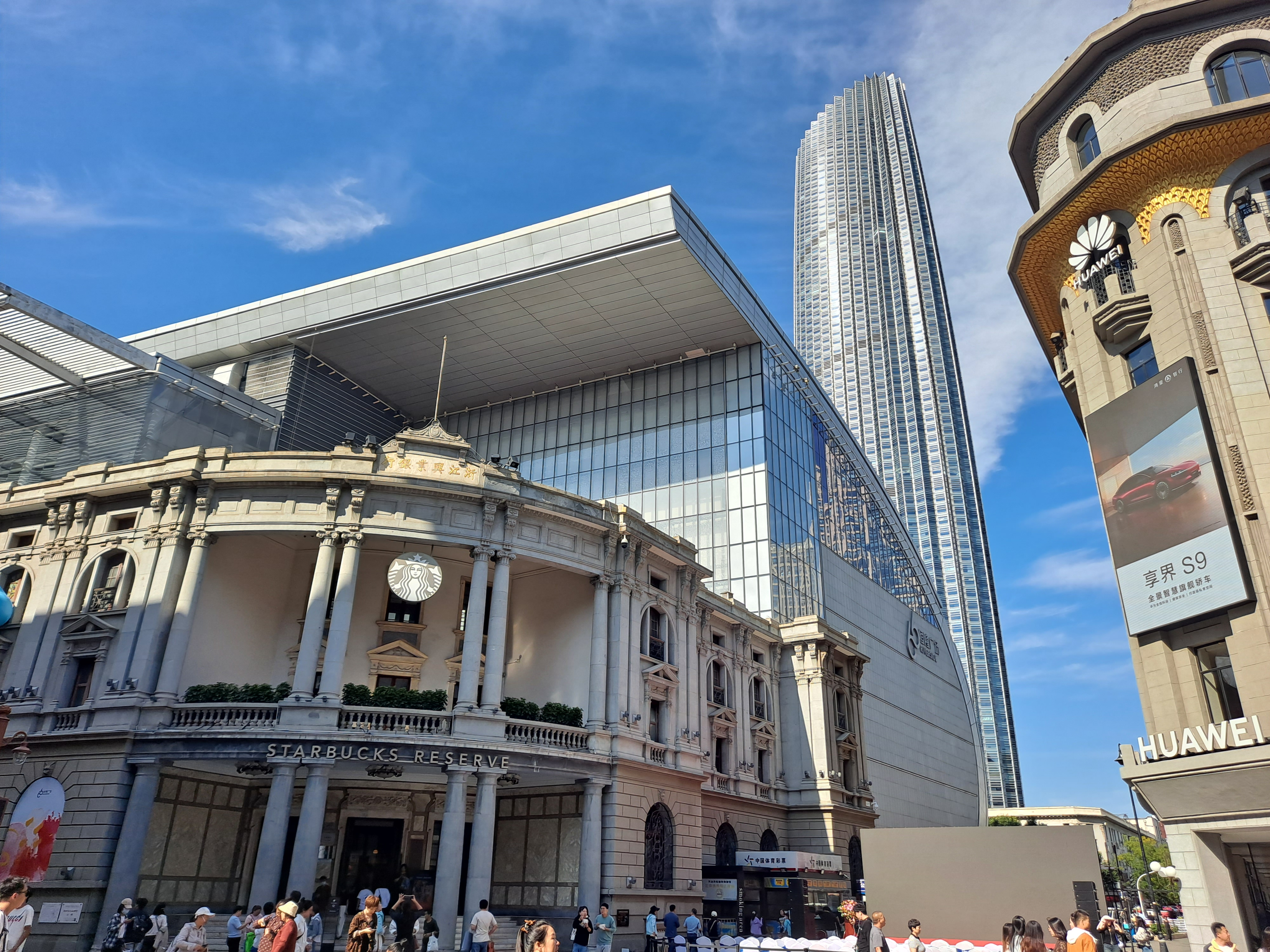
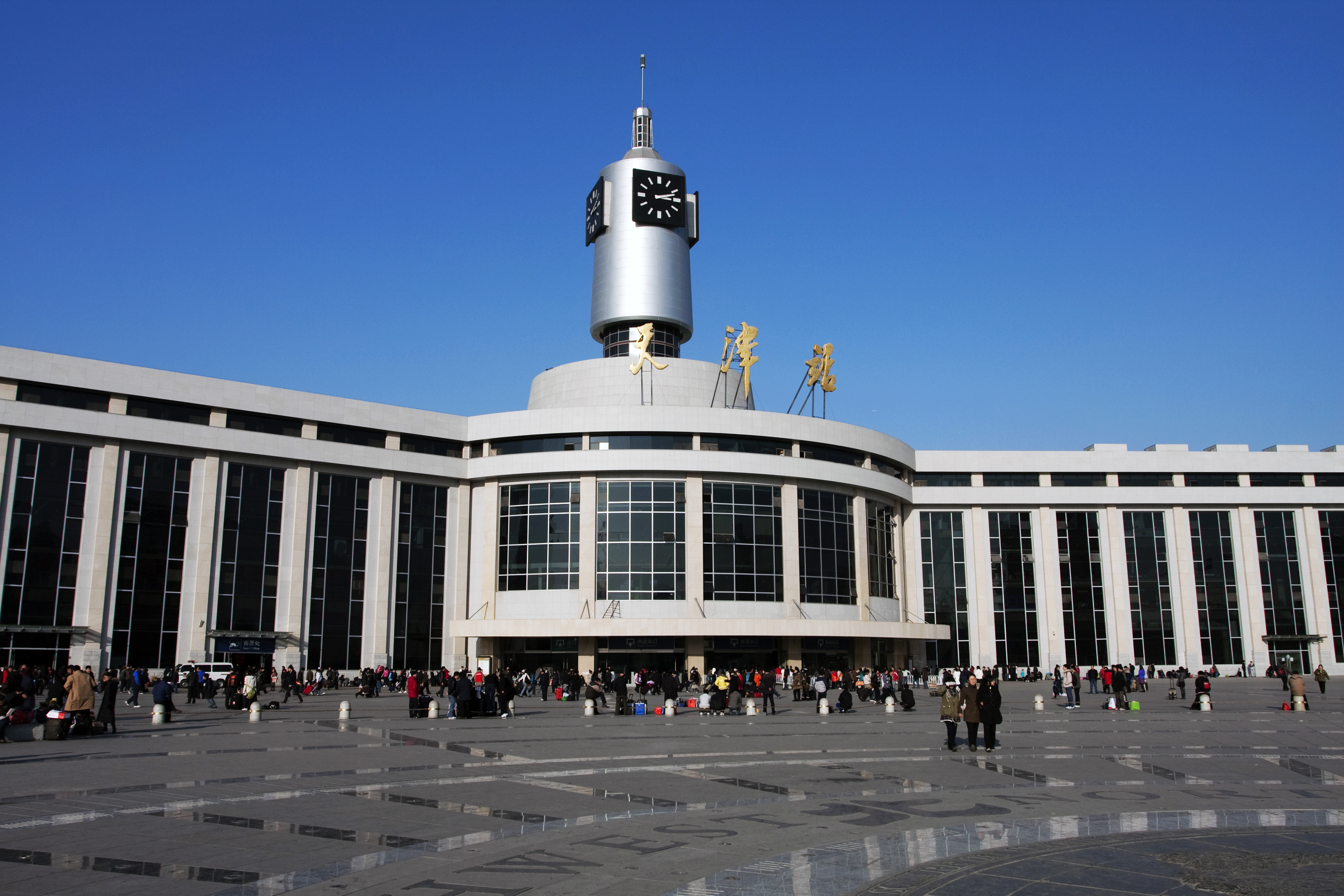
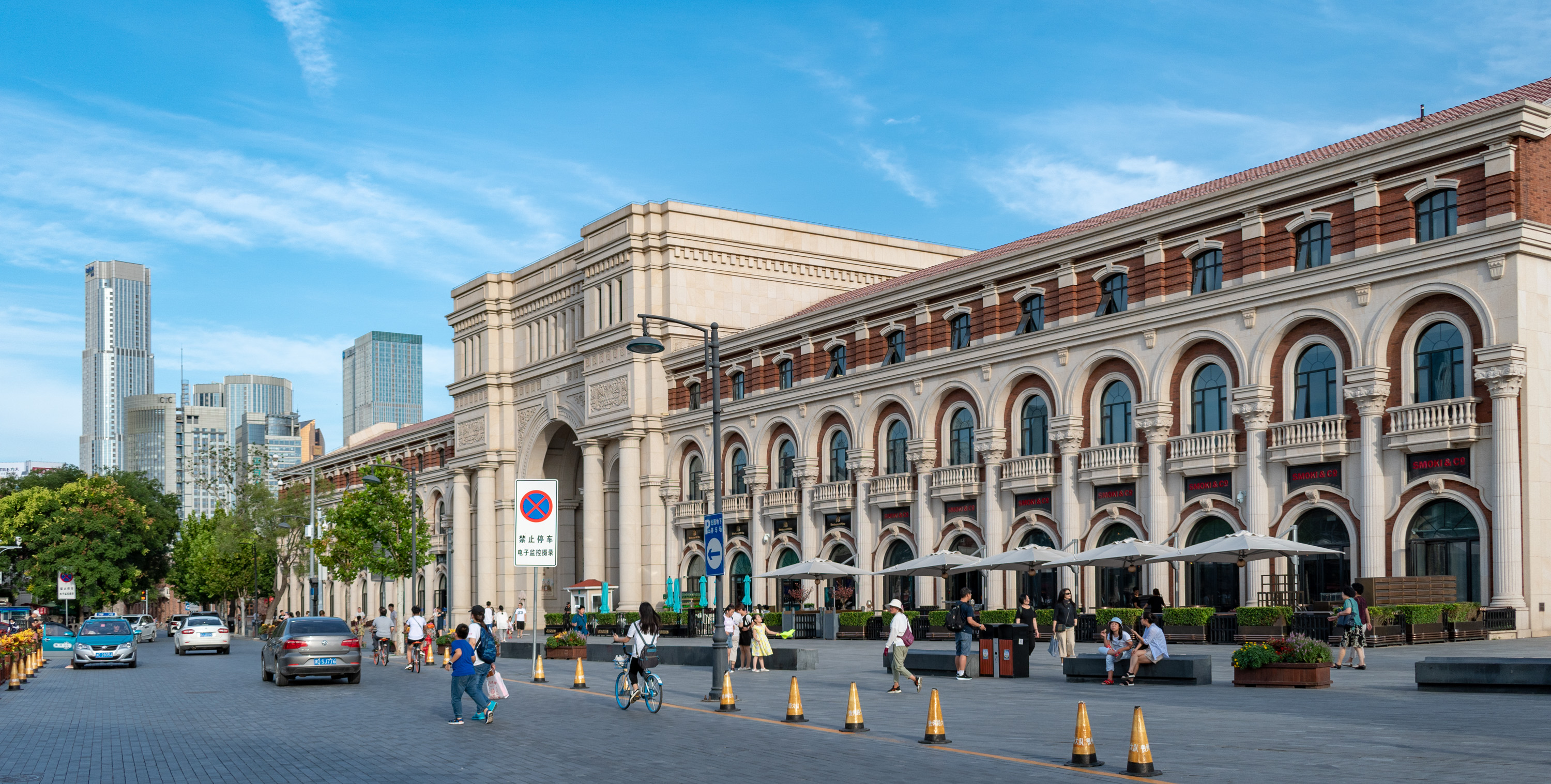
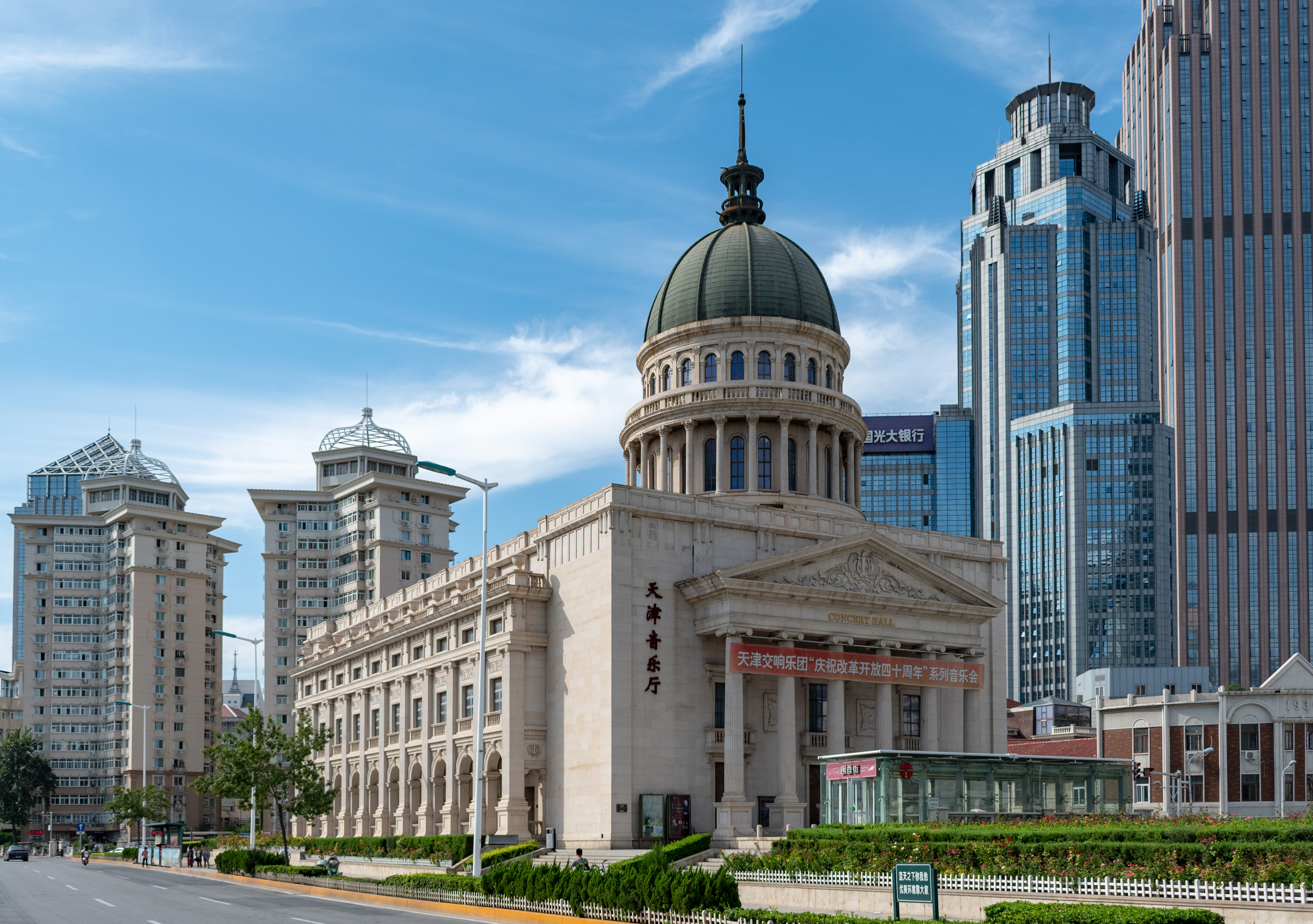
- Tianjin Eye and Hai River Binhai New Area Tianjin skyline Binjiang Avenue Tianjin railway station Minyuan Stadium Tianjin Concert Hall

- Location of Tianjin Municipality within China
- Coordinates (Tianjin Century Clock Plaza): 39°08′01″N 117°12′19″E
- Country: China
- Settled: c. 340 BC
- Municipal seat: Hexi District
- Divisions: County-level; Township-; level: 16 districts 240 towns and townships

Government
  - Type: Municipality
  - Body: Tianjin Municipal People's Congress
  - Party Secretary: Chen Min'er
  - Congress Chairman: Yu Yunlin
  - Mayor: Zhang Gong
  - Municipal CPPCC Chairman: Wang Changsong
  - National People's Congress Representation: 39 deputies

Area
  - Municipality: 11,946 km^{2} (4,612 sq mi)
  - Land: 11,609.91 km^{2} (4,482.61 sq mi)
  - Water: 186 km^{2} (72 sq mi)
  - Urban: 11,609.91 km^{2} (4,482.61 sq mi)
  - Metro: 5,609.9 km^{2} (2,166.0 sq mi)
- Elevation: 5 m (16 ft)
- Highest elevation (Jiushan Peak): 1,078 m (3,537 ft)

Population (2020 census)
  - Municipality: 13,866,009
  - Density: 1,194.325/km^{2} (3,093.288/sq mi)
  - Urban: 13,866,009
  - Urban density: 1,194.325/km^{2} (3,093.288/sq mi)
  - Metro: 11,165,706
  - Metro density: 1,990.4/km^{2} (5,155.0/sq mi)
- Demonym(s): Tianjinese; Tianjiner

GDP(2025)
  - Municipality: CN¥ 1,85 billion (24th); US$ 266 billion
  - Per capita: CN¥ 133,420 (6th); US$ 19,153
- Postal code: 300000 – 301900
- Area code: 22
- ISO 3166 code: CN-TJ
- HDI (2023): 0.867 (3rd) – very high
- Vehicle registration: 津A, B, C, D, F, G, H, J, K, L, M 津E (taxis)
- Abbreviation: TJ / 津; jīn
- Climate: Dwa/BSk
- Symbols
- Flower: China rose
- Tree: Fraxinus velutina

Tianjin
- "Tianjin" in Chinese characters
- Chinese: 天津
- Hanyu Pinyin: Tiānjīn
- Postal: Tientsin
Transcriptions
Standard Mandarin
- Hanyu Pinyin: Tiānjīn
- Bopomofo: ㄊㄧㄢ ㄐㄧㄣ
- Gwoyeu Romatzyh: Tianjin
- Wade–Giles: Tʻien^{1}-chin^{1}
- Tongyong Pinyin: Tianjin
- IPA: [tʰjɛ́n.tɕín]; [tʰi̯ɛȵ21 ʨiŋ11] (locally)
Wu
- Romanization: Thie^{平}-tsin^{平}
Yue: Cantonese
- Yale Romanization: Tīnjèun or Tīnjēun
- Jyutping: tin1 zeon1
- IPA: [tʰin˥ tsɵn˥˧] or [tʰin˥ tsɵn˥]
Southern Min
- Hokkien POJ: Thian-tin

Tianjin, (Note: /tjɛnˈdʒɪn/; Mandarin Chinese: [tʰjɛ́n.tɕín].) previously romanized as Tienchin or Tientsin, (Note: /ˈtjɛnˈtsɪn/) is a provincial-level direct-administered municipality in China. It is located on the shore of the Bohai Sea. It has a total population of 13,866,009 inhabitants at the 2020 census.

Tianjin borders Hebei Province and Beijing Municipality, bounded to the east by the Bohai Gulf portion of the Yellow Sea. Part of the Bohai Economic Rim, it is the largest coastal city in Northern China and part of the Jing-Jin-Ji megapolis.

In terms of urban population, Tianjin is the seventh largest city in China. In terms of administrative area population, Tianjin ranks fifth in mainland China. The walled city of Tianjin was built in 1404. As a treaty port since 1860, Tianjin has been a seaport and gateway to Beijing. During the Boxer Rebellion, the city was the seat of the Tianjin Provisional Government. Under the Qing dynasty and the Republic of China, Tianjin became one of the largest cities in the region. At that time, European-style buildings and mansions were constructed in concessions, some of which are preserved today. After the founding of the People's Republic of China, Tianjin suffered a depression due to the policy of the central government and the 1976 Tangshan earthquake; however, it has been recovering since the 1990s. Tianjin is classified as the largest type of port city, a Large-Port Megacity, due to its large urban population and port traffic volume.

Tianjin is currently a dual-core city, with its main urban area (including the older part of the city) located along the Hai River, which connects to the Yellow and Yangtze Rivers via the Grand Canal, and Binhai, an adjacent New Area urban core located east of the older part of the city on the coast of the Bohai Gulf. Since 2010, Tianjin's Yujiapu Financial District has become known as China's Manhattan and the city is considered to be one of the world's top 100 cities, including in the Global Financial Centres Index. As of 2024, Tianjin was ranked as a Beta+ (global second tier) city together with Barcelona and Rome by the Globalization and World Cities Research Network. In 2025, Tianjin held the Shanghai Cooperation Organization summit.

Tianjin is ranked as the 15th leading city in the world with the highest scientific research outputs and second in the North China region after Beijing. The municipality is also home to multiple institutes of higher education in Northern China, including Tianjin, Nankai, Tianjin Normal, Tianjin Medical, Tianjin Foreign Studies, Tiangong, Tianjin University of Science and Technology, Tianjin University of Technology, and Hebei University of Technology.

== Name ==
Tianjin is the pinyin spelling of the Chinese characters 天津. The name literally means 'the ford of the emperor'. The origin of the name is disputed. One traditional theory says that it was an homage to the Chu poet Qu Yuan, whose "Li Sao" includes the verse "... departing from the Ford of Heaven at dawn ..." (朝發軔於天津兮; zhāo fārèn yú Tiānjīn xī). Another says that it honors the former name of the Girl, a Chinese constellation recorded under the name Tianjin in the Astronomical Record section of the Book of Sui. A third says that it derives from a place name noted in the River Record of the History of Jin. The most common theory says that it was bestowed by the Yongle Emperor of the Ming, who crossed Tianjin's Gu River on his way south to overthrow his nephew, the Jianwen Emperor.

Prior to the introduction of pinyin, the city's name was historically romanized as Tientsin in the Chinese postal romanization. The current English spelling of Tianjin was adopted in 1958, after pinyin was introduced by the PRC government. Several countries, international organizations and media outlets have adopted the pinyin name since 1979. The Government of the Republic of China (ROC) has continued to use the postal and Wade–Giles spelling since the adoption of pinyin by the ROC government in 2009.

== History ==
=== Early history ===
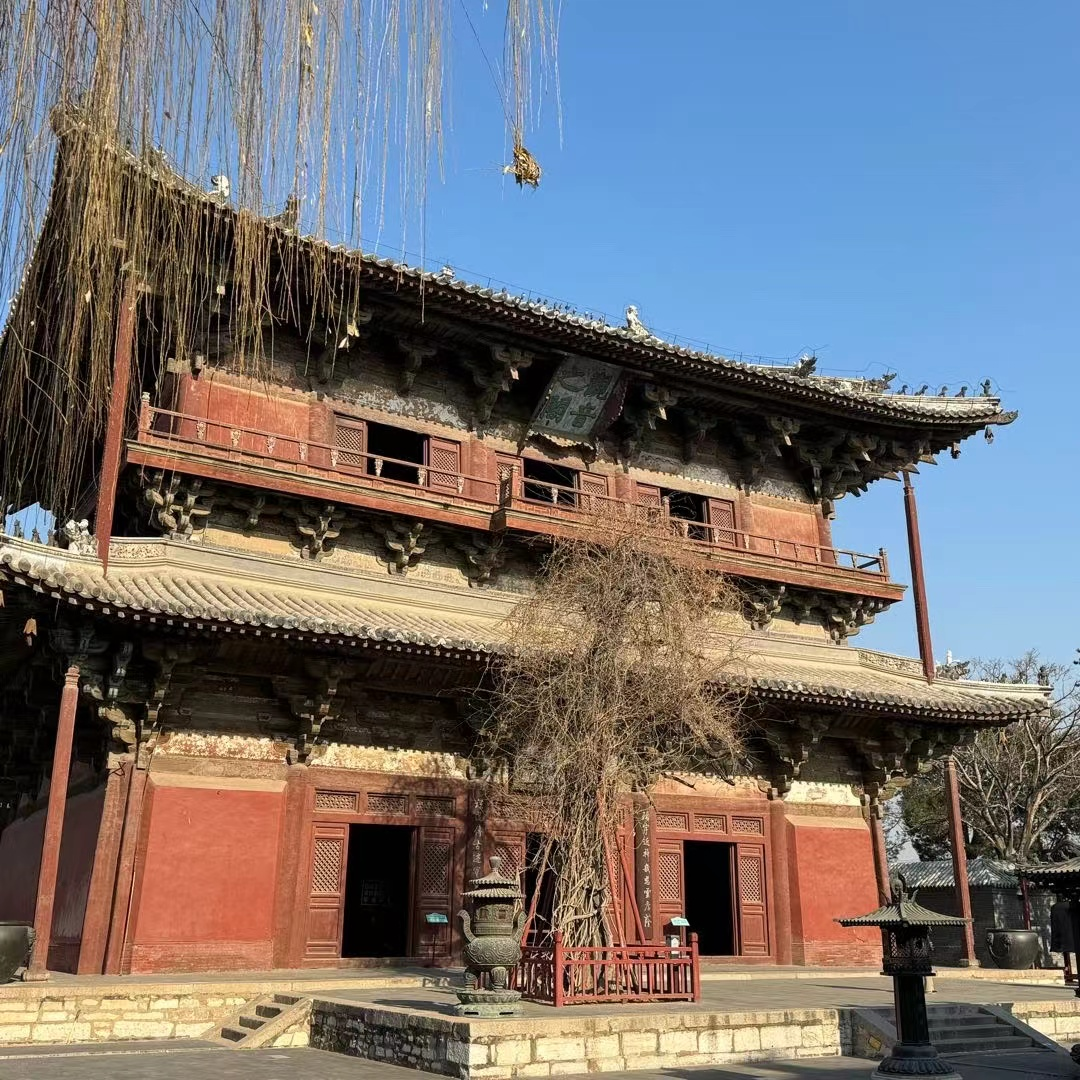
Dule Temple is a structure dating back to China's Liao Dynasty, built in 984 AD.

The land where Tianjin is now located was created in between 900 and 1300 CE by the sediments of rivers entering the sea at the Bohai Gulf, including the Yellow River, which entered the open sea in the area at one time. The construction of the Grand Canal under the Sui dynasty helped the future development of Tianjin, as the canal ran from Hangzhou to the Beijing and Tianjin region by 609 CE. Grain from southern China was regularly transported to the north through the canal and was used during the subsequent dynasties. Tianjin began to be increasingly mentioned in records during the Song dynasty and gained importance during the Yuan dynasty. Tianjin experienced development under the Yuan and became a location for the storage of goods and grains. Tianjin became a garrison town and shipping station during the Ming dynasty; it was a center of commerce by the 17th century.

=== Qing dynasty ===
During the Qing dynasty (1644–1911), the Tianjin Prefecture, or Zhou (州), was established in 1725, and Tianjin County was established within the prefecture in 1731. Later, it became an urban prefecture or Fu (府), before becoming a relay station (駐地) under the command of the Viceroy of Zhili.

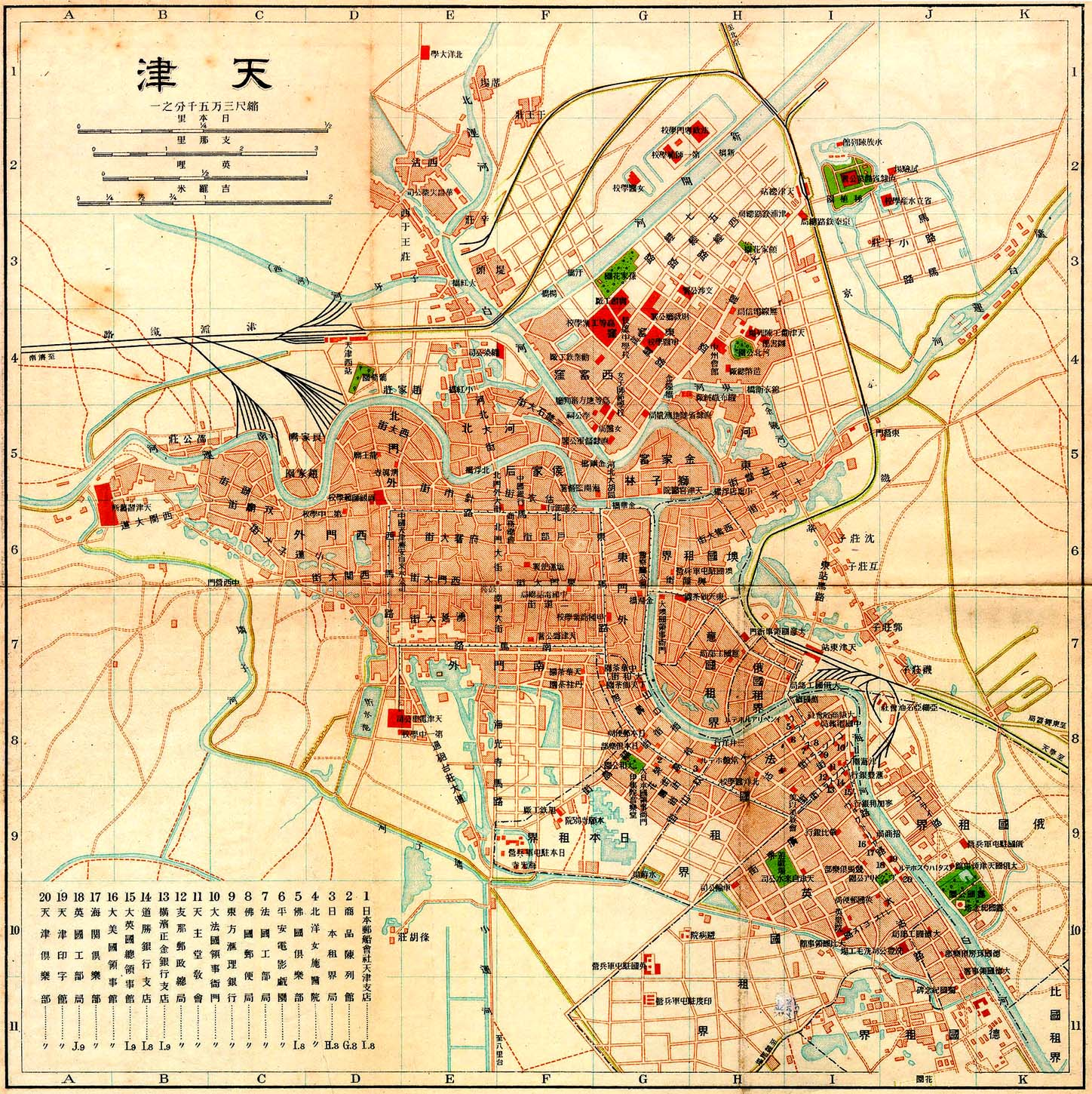
1913 map of Tianjin

=== Opening up as a treaty port ===
In 1856, Chinese soldiers boarded The Arrow, a Chinese-owned ship registered in Hong Kong that flew the British flag and which was suspected of piracy, smuggling, and involvement in the opium trade. The soldiers captured twelve men and imprisoned them. In response, the British and French sent gunboats under the command of Admiral Sir Michael Seymour to capture the Taku forts near Tianjin in May 1858. At the end of the first part of the Second Opium War in June of the same year, the British and French prevailed, and the Treaty of Tientsin was signed, which opened Tianjin (Tientsin) to foreign trade. The treaties were ratified by the Xianfeng Emperor in 1860, so Tianjin was formally opened to Great Britain and France and thus to the outside world. Between 1895 and 1900, Britain and France were joined by Japan, Germany and Russia, and some countries without Chinese concessions, such as Austria-Hungary, Italy and Belgium, in establishing self-contained concessions in Tianjin, each with its own prisons, schools, barracks and hospitals. These nations left architectural reminders of their rule, which include churches and thousands of villas.

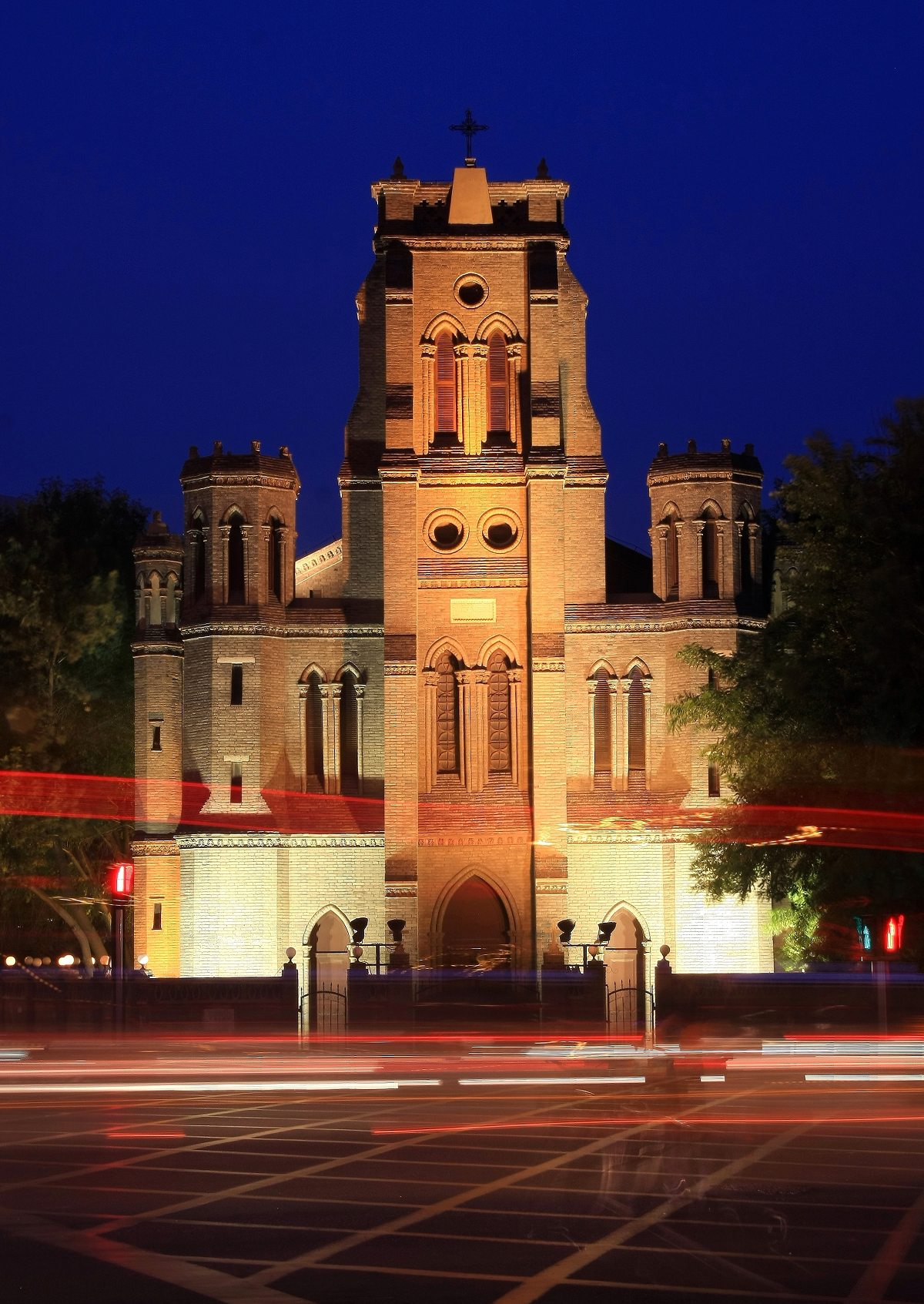
Church of Our Lady's Victories, built in 1869, was the site of the Tianjin Church Massacre.

The presence of foreign influence in Tianjin was not always peaceful; one violent incident was that of the Tianjin Church Massacre. In June 1870, the orphanage held by the Wanghailou Church (translated as Church Our Lady's Victories) in Tianjin, which built by French Roman Catholic missionaries, was accused of kidnapping and brainwashing Chinese children. On June 21, the magistrate of Tianjin County initiated a conflict at the church that developed into violent clashes between the church's Christian supporters and some non-Christian Tianjin residents. The protesters eventually burned down Wanghailou Church and the nearby French consulate, killing eighteen foreigners, including ten French nuns, the French consul, and merchants. France and six other Western nations complained to the Qing government, which was forced to pay compensation for the incident.

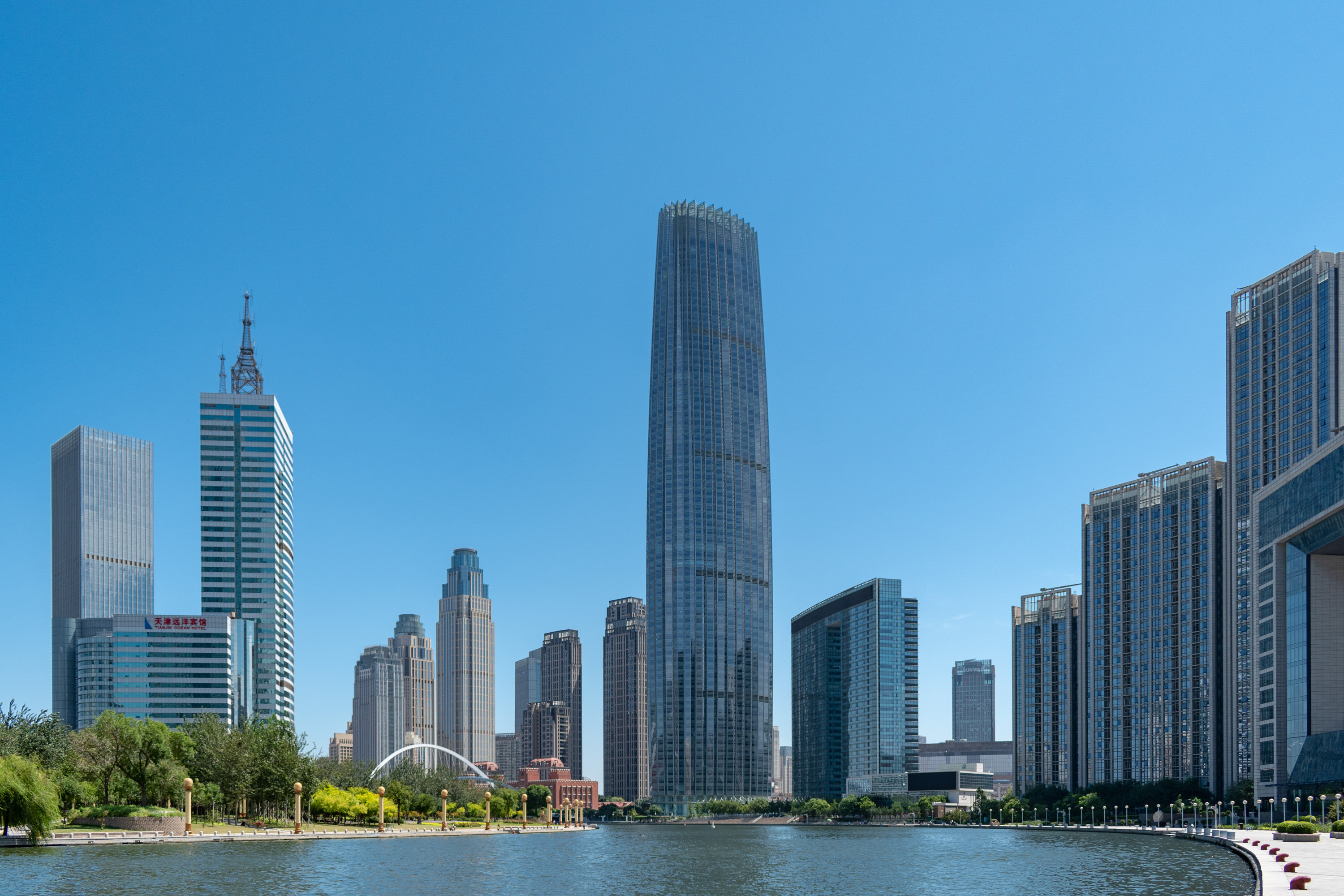
Haihe River in Tianjin

In 1885, Li Hongzhang founded the Tianjin Military Academy (天津武備學堂) for Chinese army officers with German advisors as a part of his military reforms. The academy's founding was supported by the Anhui Army commander Zhou Shengchuan. The academy was to serve the Anhui Army and the Green Standard Army officers. The instructors were German officers. In 1887, the academy started a program to train teenagers to become army officers; the program continued for five years. Practical and technical subjects including sciences, foreign languages, Chinese literature, mathematics, and history were taught at the school and exams were administered to students. The lessons taught at the Tianjin Military Academy were copied for the Weihaiwei and Shanhaiguan military schools. A maritime defense fund supplied the budget for the Tianjin Military Academy, which was located in the same area as the Tianjin Naval Academy. In 1886, the Tianjin Military Academy adopted Romance of the Three Kingdoms as part of its curriculum. Among its alumni were Wang Yingkai and Duan Qirui; its staff included Yinchang.

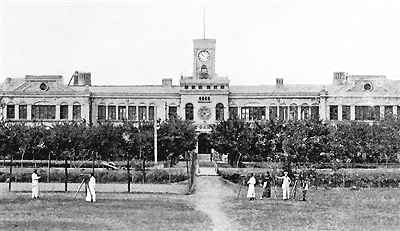
Peiyang University, established 1895

In June 1900, the Boxers were able to seize control of parts of Tianjin. On June 26, European defense forces heading towards Beijing were stopped by Boxers at nearby Langfang; they were defeated and forced to turn back to Tianjin. The foreign concessions were also under siege for several weeks.

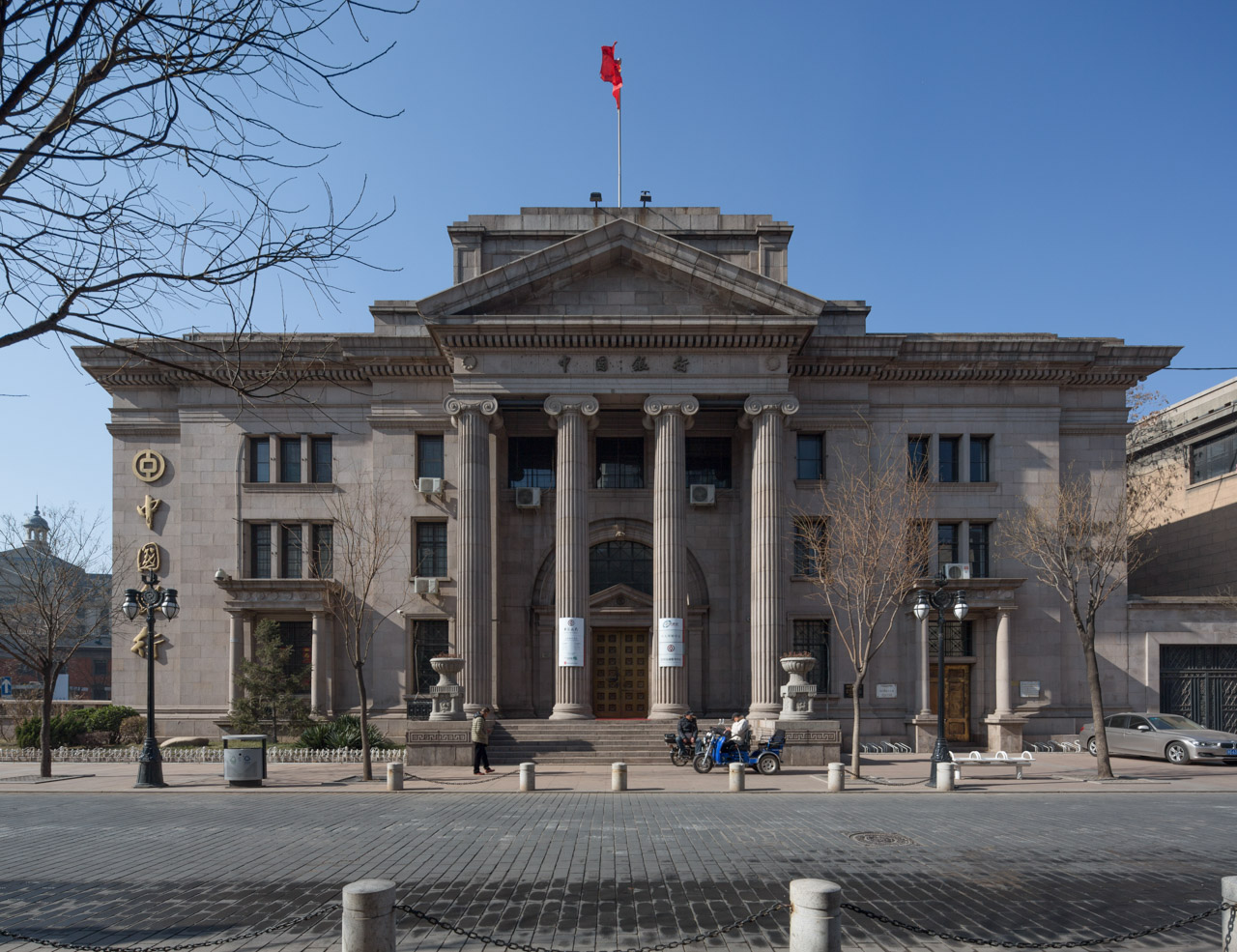
The HSBC Tianjin Branch was the first foreign bank in the Tianjin Concession, and the building is now occupied by the Bank of China.

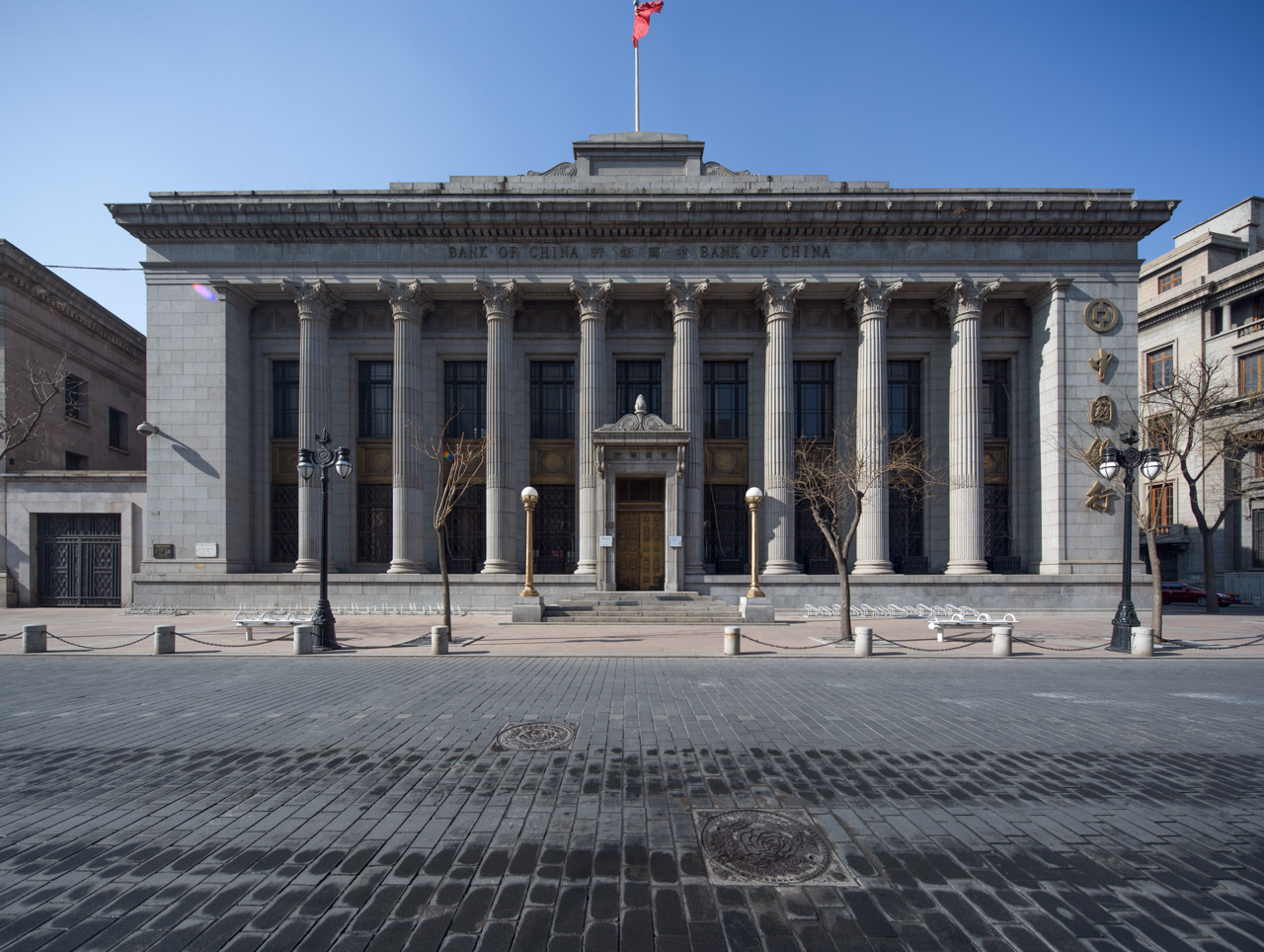
The Yokohama Specie Bank Tianjin Branch was a Japanese bank established in Tianjin during the period of Japan's invasion of China. The building is now used by the Bank of China.

In July 1900, the Eight-Nation Alliance recaptured Tianjin. This alliance soon established the Tianjin Provisional Government, which was composed of representatives from each of the occupying forces (Russia, Britain, Japan, Germany, France, America, Austro-Hungary, and Italy). The city was governed by this council until August 15, 1902, when the city was returned to Qing control. Qing General Yuan Shikai led efforts to transform Tianjin into a modern city, establishing the first modern Chinese police force. In 1907, Yuan supervised China's first modern democratic elections for a county council.

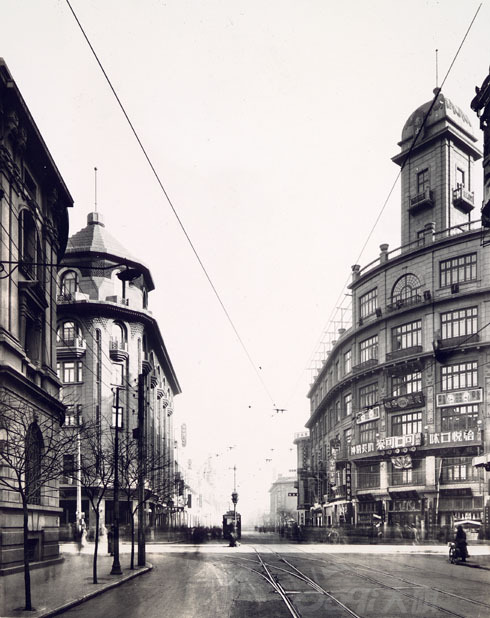
Major crossing (Rue Général Foch and Rue de Chaylard) of downtown Tianjin in French concession

Western nations were permitted to garrison the area to ensure open access to Beijing. The British maintained a brigade of two battalions in Tianjin, and the Italians, French, Japanese, Germans, Russians, and Austro-Hungarians maintained their forces using strength regiments; the United States did not initially participate.

In 1915-1916, a political and diplomatic dispute, the Laoxikai Affair, arose between France and the Republic of China. It developed out of an attempt by the French consulate to expand France's extraterritorial power in Tianjin outside of the French concession and into the adjacent Laoxikai district where a Catholic Cathedral had recently been built. On 20 October 1916, French police arrested nine Chinese police officers. Chinese residents in Tianjin responded by rioting. The Chinese government protested the arrests, and the French released the Chinese police officers and issued an apology.

During World War I, the German and Austro-Hungarian garrisons were captured as prisoners of war by Allied Forces; meanwhile, in 1918, the Bolshevik government withdrew the Russian garrison. In 1920, the remaining participating nations asked the United States to join them, and the US then sent the 15th Infantry Regiment, minus one battalion, to Tianjin from the Philippines.

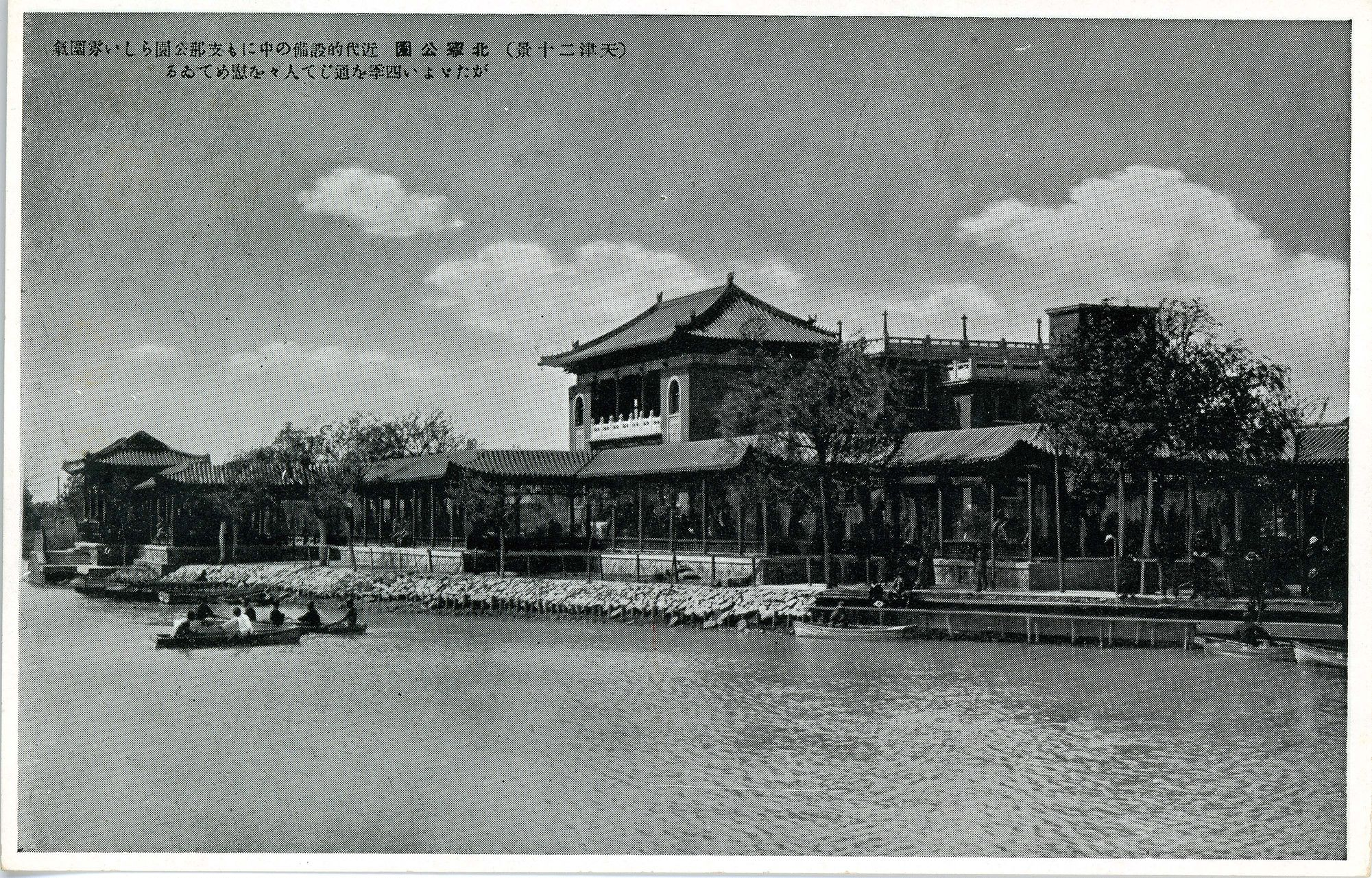
Beining Park, c. 1930

Because of the development of industry, commerce and finance in the city, Tianjin was established as a municipality of China in 1927. From 1930 to 1935, Tianjin was the provincial capital of Hebei; afterwards, it was reestablished as an independent municipality.

Garrison duty was highly regarded by the troops. General George C. Marshall, the "architect of victory" in World War II, during which he was the Chief of Staff of the United States Army, served in Tianjin in the 1920s as the Executive Officer of the 15th Infantry. The US withdrew the infantry unit in 1938, but the nation's presence was maintained by the dispatch of a small US Marine Corps unit from the Embassy Guard at Beijing.

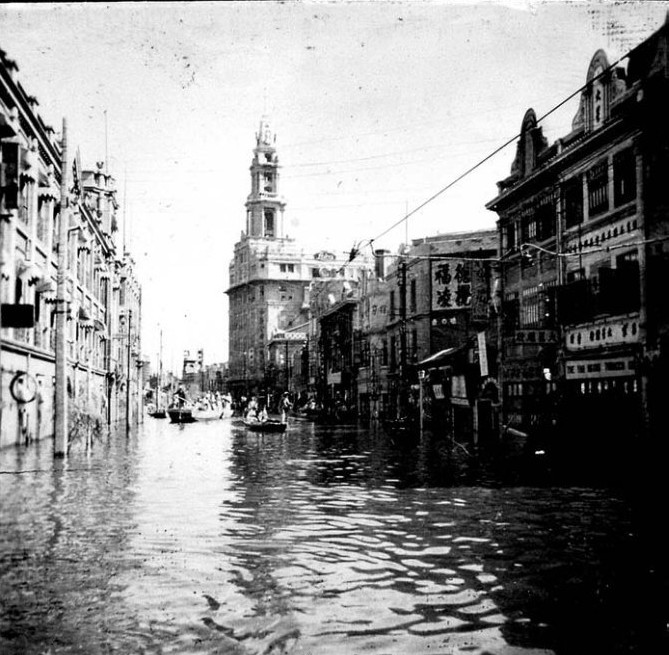
Asahi Street (now Heping Road) in 1939 Tianjin flood

=== Second Sino-Japanese War ===
On July 30, 1937, during the Second Sino-Japanese War, Tianjin fell to Japan, but was not entirely occupied, as the Japanese generally respected foreign concessions until 1941, when American and British concessions were occupied. In the summer of 1939, the Tientsin Incident damaged Anglo-Japanese relations. On June 14, 1939, the Imperial Japanese Army surrounded and blockaded a British concession due to the refusal of British authorities to transfer six Chinese people, who had assassinated a Japanese collaborator and taken refuge in the British concession, to be under Japan's authority. For a time, the events of 1939 appeared likely to cause an Anglo-Japanese war, especially when reports of the Japanese Army mistreating British subjects wishing to leave or enter the concession appeared in British newspapers. The situation ended when British Prime Minister Neville Chamberlain was advised by the Royal Navy and the Foreign Office that the only way to force the Japanese to lift the blockade was to send the main British battle fleet to Far Eastern waters, and that given the situation in Europe, it would be inappropriate to send the British fleet out of European waters, thus leading the British to finally turn over the six Chinese people, who were then executed by the Japanese. During the Japanese occupation, Tianjin was ruled by the North China Executive Committee, a puppet state based in Beijing.

On August 9, 1940, all of the British troops in Tianjin were ordered to withdraw. On November 14, 1941, the American Marine unit stationed in Tianjin was ordered to leave, but before it left, the Japanese attacked the United States. The American Marine detachment surrendered to the Japanese on December 8, 1941. Only the Italian and French concessions (the local French officials were loyal to Vichy) were allowed by the Japanese to remain. When Italy signed an armistice with the Allies in September 1943, Japanese troops took the Italian concession, following a battle with its garrison, and the Italian Social Republic formally ceded the concession to Wang Jingwei's Japan-controlled puppet state. Japanese occupation of the city lasted until August 15, 1945, with the surrender of Japan marking the end of World War II.

=== After World War II ===
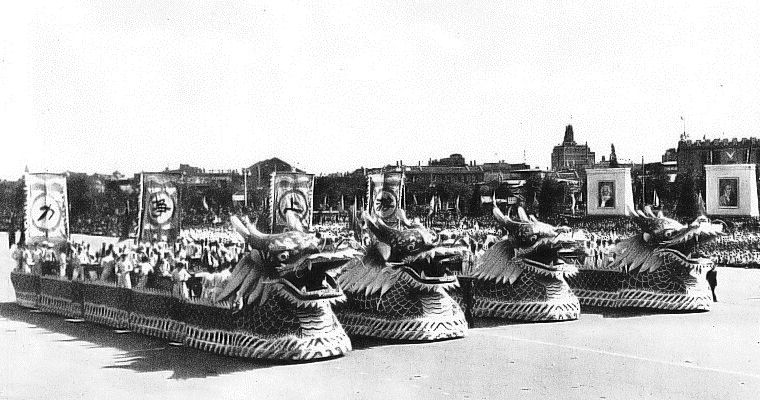
P.R.China's 10th anniversary parade in Tianjin in 1959

In the Pingjin Campaign of the Chinese Civil War, the city was captured after 29 hours of fighting. The Chinese Communist Party (CCP) took Tianjin on January 15, 1949.

From 1949 to February 1958, Tianjin was a municipality directly under the control of the central government. In October 1952, Tanggu New Port officially opened its doors, and the first 10,000-ton ferry arrived at Newport Pier. In February 1958, due to the "Great Leap Forward" and the city's industrial foundation, Tianjin was incorporated into Hebei Province, the capital of which was relocated to Tianjin for eight years. During the period, under the coordination of the State Council, the city of Tianjin implemented a separate policy for central planning, which was independent of Hebei Province. However, a number of factories and colleges in Tianjin moved to Hebei, hindering Tianjin's economic development. In January 1967, due to preparation and concerns that Tianjin would become a battlefield, Hebei Province repatriated its provincial capital to Baoding, and the CCP Central Committee decided that Tianjin should be restored to the central municipality and remain so. In April 1970, since the central government had applied for funding for the construction of the subway, the Tianjin Municipal Government decided to raise funds on its own to establish the project using the name of the channel and by build it on the basis of the old walled river. In July 1973, five counties, including Jixian, Baodi, Wuqing, Jinghai, and Ninghe, were formally placed under the jurisdiction of Tianjin.

On July 28, 1976, during the 7.6 magnitude Tangshan Earthquake, Tianjin was affected by shock waves and experienced a loss of life. In the city, 24,345 people died and 21,497 were seriously injured. 60% of the city's buildings were destroyed and more than 30% of the enterprises and Peking Port Reservoir and Yuqiao Reservoir were seriously damaged. Nearly 700,000 people were left homeless. On October 10 of the same year, the Tianjin Underground Railway was opened to traffic. In 1981, Miyun Reservoir was built on the upper reaches of the Hai River; it is now used to supply water for Beijing; however; the reservoir stopped the river from supplying water to Tianjin, resulting in difficulty with water usage in the city. As a result, during 1976, the State Council of the People's Republic of China decided to initiate a project to solve the problem of water usage in Tianjin by attracting individuals to the city's academic centers.

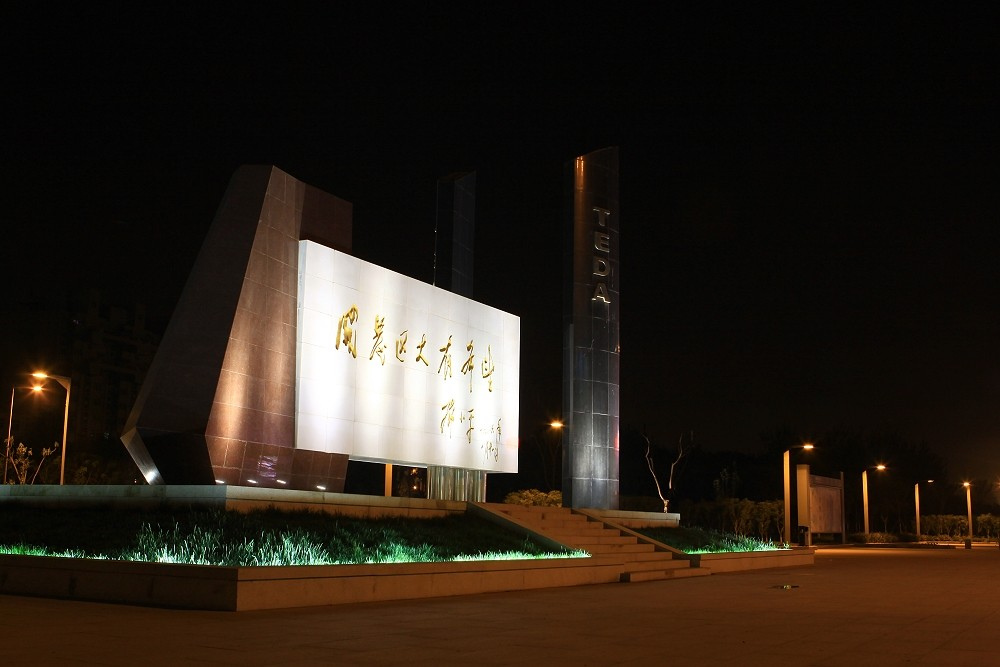
Monument of TEDA

In 1984, during the beginning of the Chinese government's economic reforms, Tianjin was listed as one of the 14 coastal open cities by the State Council and the Tianjin Development Zone's economy began to develop. However, the overall speed of development in Tianjin is still slower than that of special economic zones and that of other southeast coastal areas. In 1994, Tianjin began its industrial shift towards the east and developed the Binhai New Area, with the Tianjin Port as its core. In October 2005, the Fifth Plenary Session of the 16th CCP Central Committee convened; its meeting decided to incorporate the development and opening of the Binhai New Area into its Eleventh Five-Year Plan and the national development strategy. In March 2006, the State Council executive meeting positioned Tianjin as an "international port city, a northern economic center, and an ecological city." Since then, the dispute between the Beijing-Tianjin economic center at the policy level has come to an end. In May 2006, the State Council approved the Binhai New Area as a national integrated reform pilot area. In June of the same year, the State Council's Opinions on Promoting the Development and Opening of the Tianjin Binhai New Area were announced; they stated the following: "In financial enterprises, financial services, financial markets, and finance Major reforms such as opening up can, in principle, be scheduled to precede the Tianjin Binhai New Area."

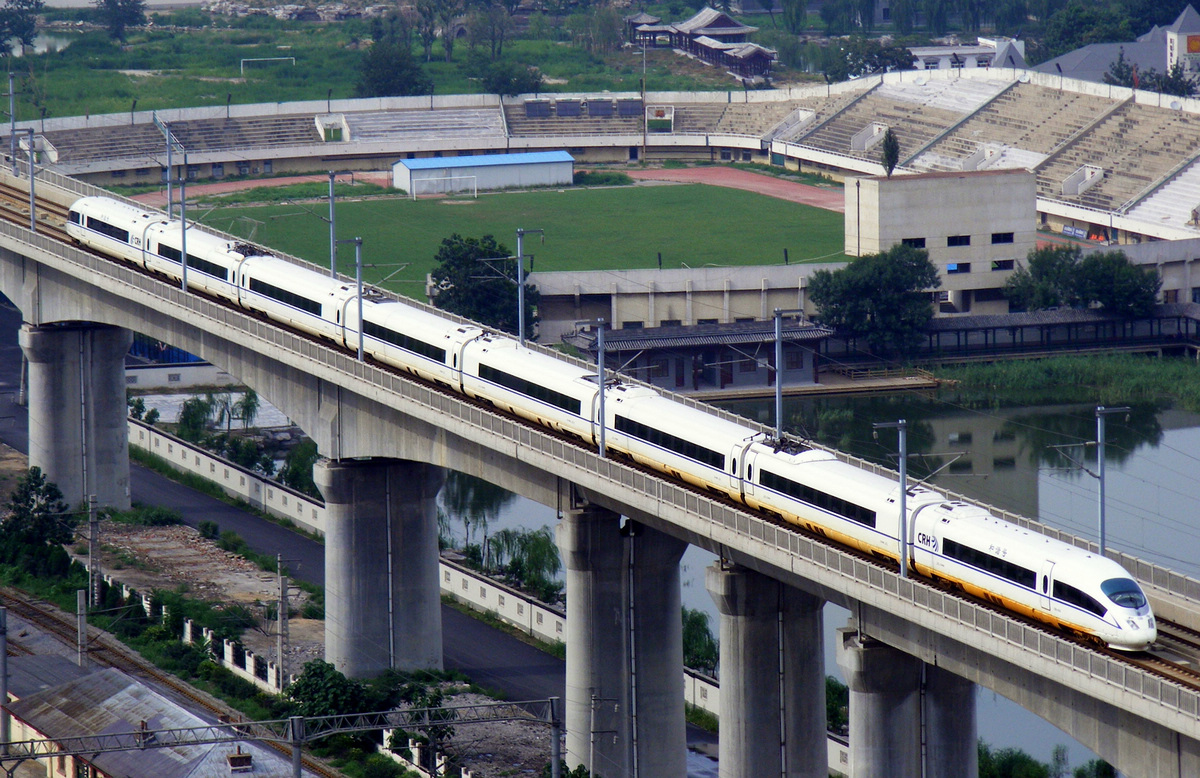
Beijing-Tianjin Intercity Railway

View of the Hai River

In August 2008, China's first high-speed railway, the Beijing-Tianjin Intercity Railway, which has a speed of 350 kilometers per hour, was opened. In August 2008, Tianjin was the co-host city of the 29th Olympic Games. In September 2008, the Annual Meeting of the New Champions of World Economic Forum (also called Summer Davos) began to be established in Tianjin; it is now held every two years. In October 2010, the UN Climate Change Conference convened in Tianjin. In 2012, the Tianjin Metro Lines 2, 3, and 9 were completed and open to traffic, and Tianjin Rail Transit was formally networked.

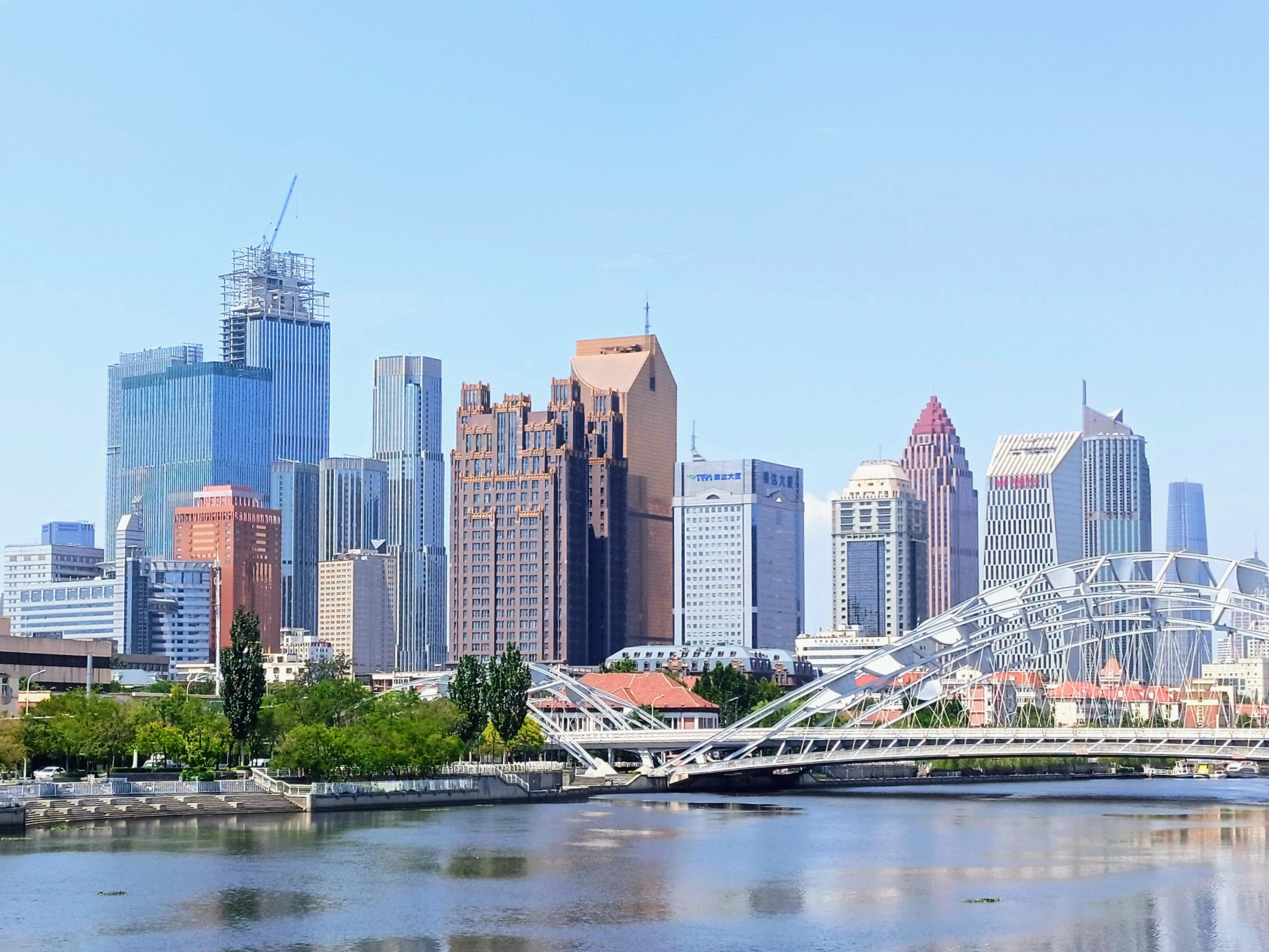
CBD in Tianjin

In October 2013, Tianjin hosted an international comprehensive event for the first time by hosting the East Asian Games. In 2014, the coordinated development of Beijing, Tianjin, and Hebei was officially incorporated into the national strategy; Tianjin was positioned as the National Advanced Manufacturing R&D Base, Northern International Shipping Core Area, Financial Innovation Operation Demonstration Area, and Reform and Opening-up Preceding Area. In the same year, the first phase of the South-to-North Water Transfer Project was completed, so water availability in Tianjin increased. On February 26, 2015, the Tianjin National Independent Innovation Demonstration Zone was formally established. On April 21, the China (Tianjin) Free Trade Pilot Zone was also formally established. On April 27, Jincheng Bank, the first private bank in northern China, officially opened its doors.

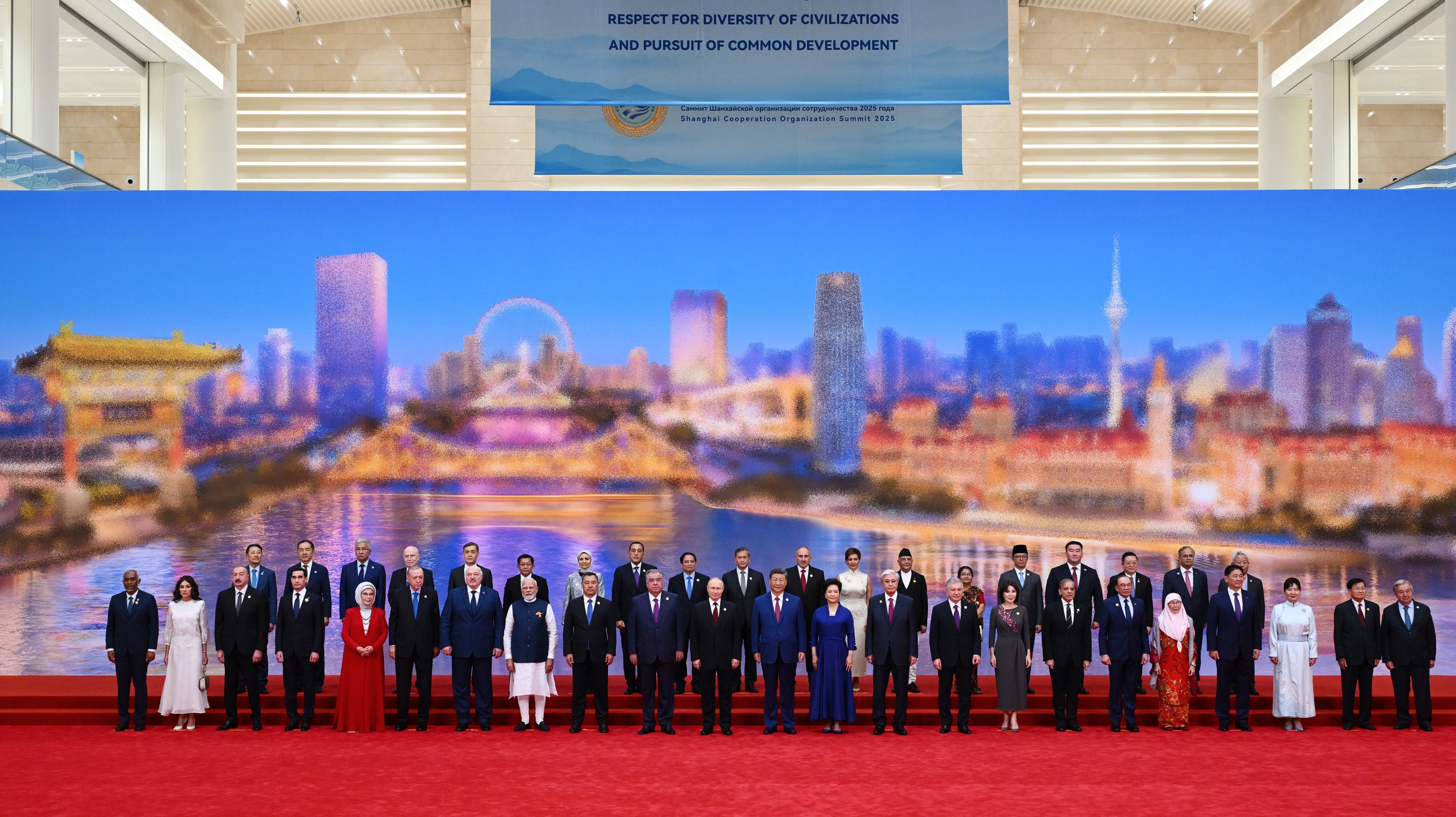
2025 Tianjin SCO summit

On August 12, 2015, a fire and explosion occurred in a chemical warehouse in Tianjin Port, causing 173 deaths, hundreds of injuries, and property losses. The cost to businesses caused by the explosion was estimated to be $9 billion, making it the most expensive supply chain disruption of 2015.

In 2025, Tianjin held the Shanghai Cooperation Organization summit.

== Geography ==
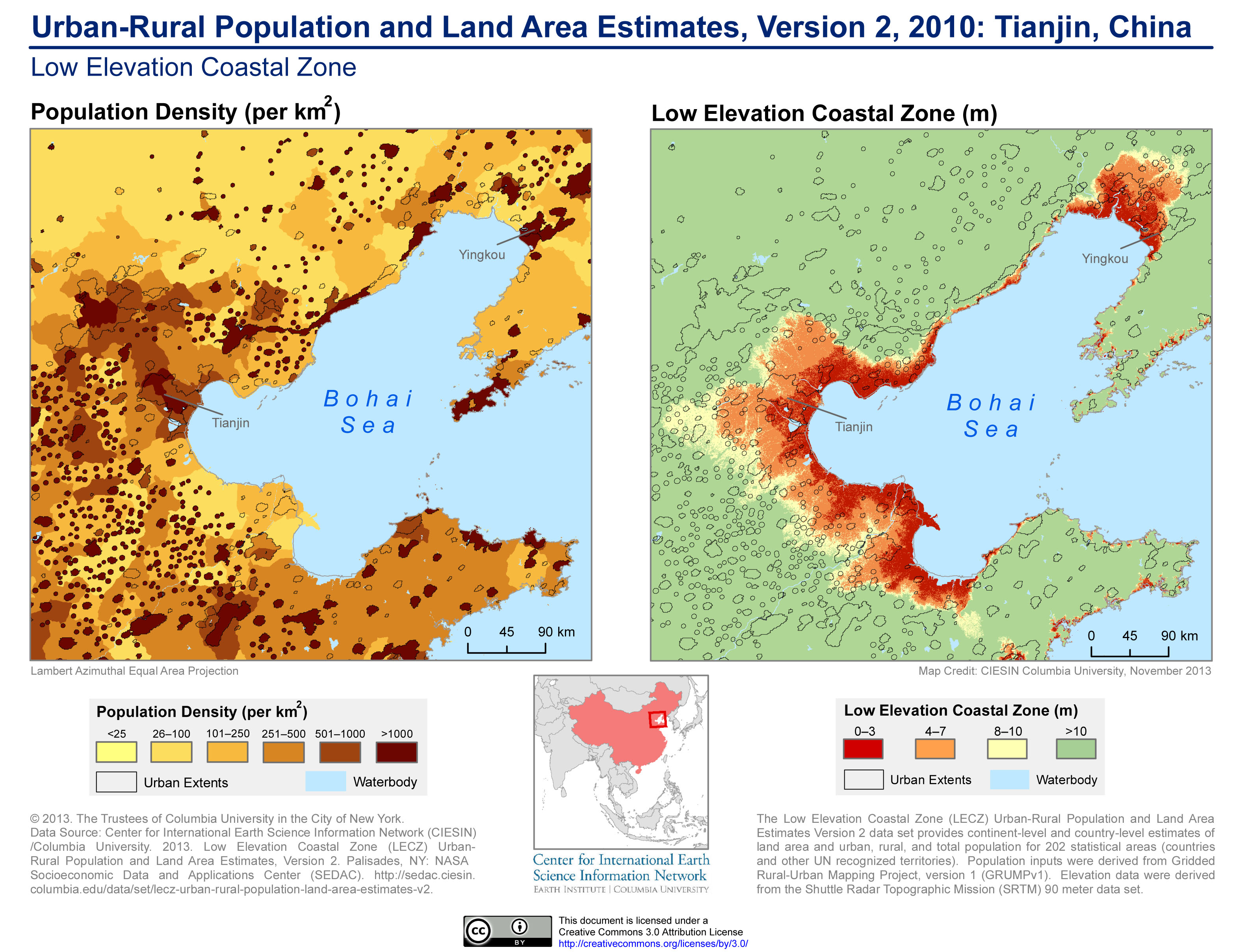
Population density and low elevation coastal zones in the Tianjin area. Tianjin is particularly vulnerable to sea level rise.

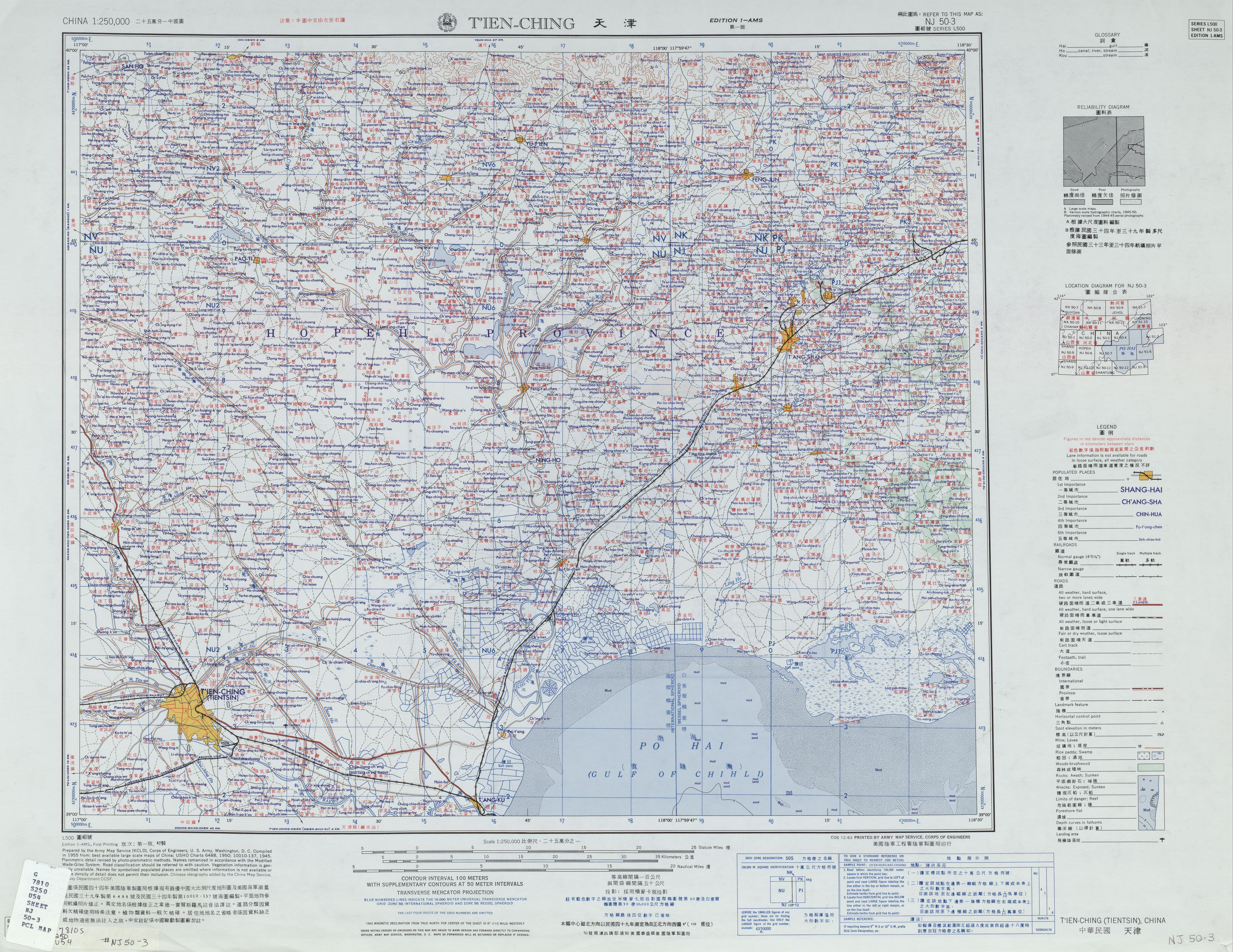
Tianjin (labeled as T'IEN-CHING (TIENTSIN) 天津) (1955)

Map of the Hai River Basin

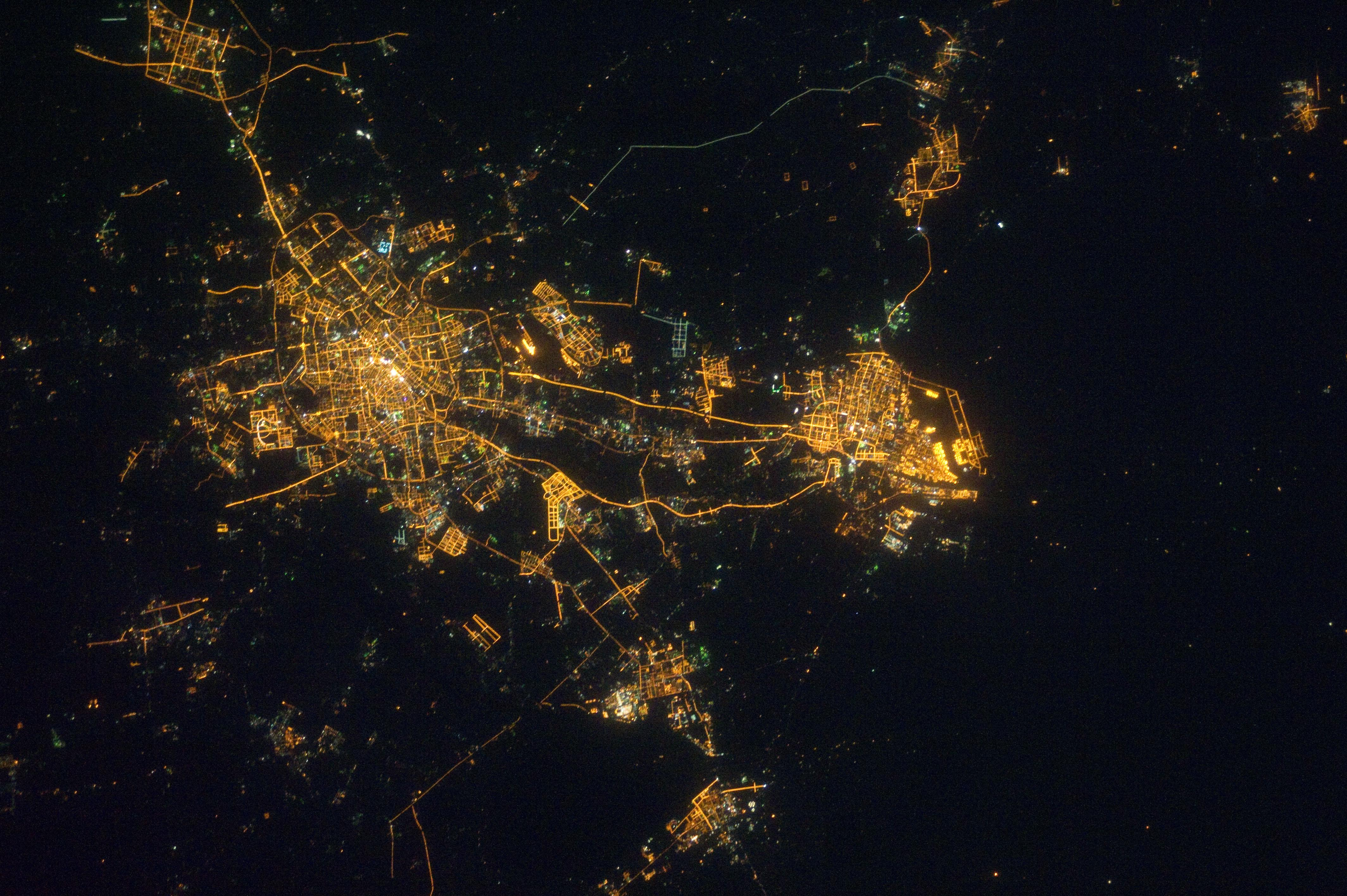
2011 satellite image of Tianjin. The city center is on the left, while the smaller urban area to the right is the Binhai New Area.

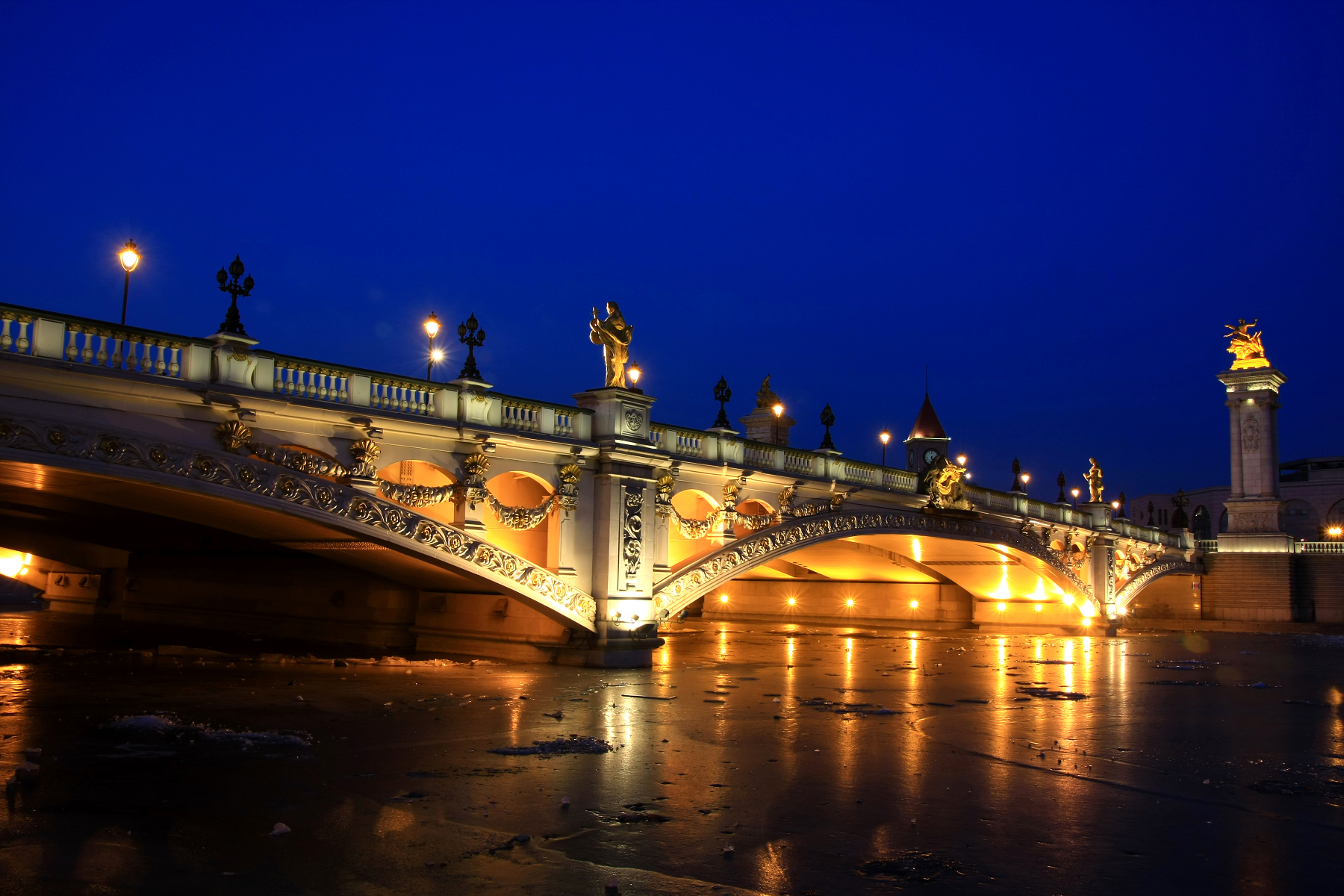
Hai River in 2011

Tianjin is located on the west coast of the Bohai Gulf; the provinces of Shandong and Liaoning are located across those waters. The city is bordered by Beijing, which is 120 kilometers (75 mi) to the northwest. Tianjin is surrounded on all sides by Hebei, with the exception of its eastern border, which is the Bohai Sea. With a latitude ranging from 38° 34' to 40° 15' N and a longitude ranging from 116° 43' to 118° 04' E, the total area of the city is 11,860.63 square kilometers (4,579.41 sq mi).

The city has 153 km (95 mi) of coastline and 1,137.48 kilometers (706.80 mi) of land border. It is located at the northern end of the Grand Canal of China, which connects with the Yellow and Yangtze Rivers. The municipality is generally flat and is swampy near the coast; however, it has hills in the north, where the Yan Mountains enter Tianjin. Tidal flats occur on the coastal plain adjacent to the city. The highest point in the municipality is Jiuding Peak (九顶山) in Ji County on the northern border with Hebei; the mountain has an altitude of 1,078.5 m (3,538 ft).

In the Tianjin Municipality, the Hai River forms at the confluence of the Ziya River (子牙河), Daqing River (大清河), Yongding River, North Grand Canal, and South Grand Canal; it enters the Pacific Ocean within the municipality as well as in Tanggu District. Reservoirs include the Beidagang Reservoir in the south (in Dagang District) and the Yuqiao Reservoir in the north in Ji County.

=== Climate ===
Tianjin has a semi-arid climate (using the Köppen system, the city has a BSk climate bordering on Dwa and Cwa). As in other areas of East Asia, the city has a four-season, monsoon-influenced climate; it also has cold, windy, and dry winters due to the Siberian anticyclone and hot, humid summers due to the monsoon season. Spring in the city is dry and windy; the season sometimes consists of sandstorms blowing in from the Gobi Desert, which are capable of lasting for several days. The monthly 24-hour average temperature ranges from −2.8 °C (27.0 °F) in January to 27.2 °C (81.0 °F) in July, with an annual mean of 13.3 °C (55.9 °F). Extreme temperatures in the city at the main weather station in Xiqing District have ranged from −22.9 °C (−9 °F) to 41.1 °C (106 °F). With the monthly percentage of the possible amount of sunshine ranging from 45% in July to 61% in March and April, the city receives 2,460 hours of sunshine annually. Having an annual total precipitation of 521 millimeters (20.5 in), with nearly three-fifths of it occurring in July and August alone, the city lies within the semi-arid climate zone, although parts of the municipality are humid continental (Köppen BSk/Dwa, respectively).

Climate data for Tianjin (Dongli District), elevation 2 m (6.6 ft), (1991–2020 normals, extremes 1951–present)
| Month | Jan | Feb | Mar | Apr | May | Jun | Jul | Aug | Sep | Oct | Nov | Dec | Year |
|---|---|---|---|---|---|---|---|---|---|---|---|---|---|
| Record high °C (°F) | 14.3 (57.7) | 20.8 (69.4) | 30.5 (86.9) | 33.1 (91.6) | 40.5 (104.9) | 40.6 (105.1) | 40.5 (104.9) | 37.4 (99.3) | 34.9 (94.8) | 30.8 (87.4) | 23.1 (73.6) | 14.4 (57.9) | 40.6 (105.1) |
| Mean maximum °C (°F) | 9.4 (48.9) | 13.9 (57.0) | 21.6 (70.9) | 28.7 (83.7) | 33.6 (92.5) | 37.1 (98.8) | 36.5 (97.7) | 35.1 (95.2) | 31.8 (89.2) | 25.4 (77.7) | 17.5 (63.5) | 11.2 (52.2) | 38.0 (100.4) |
| Mean daily maximum °C (°F) | 2.1 (35.8) | 5.8 (42.4) | 12.8 (55.0) | 20.8 (69.4) | 26.8 (80.2) | 30.2 (86.4) | 31.6 (88.9) | 30.7 (87.3) | 26.9 (80.4) | 19.8 (67.6) | 10.7 (51.3) | 3.7 (38.7) | 18.5 (65.3) |
| Daily mean °C (°F) | −2.8 (27.0) | 0.4 (32.7) | 7.0 (44.6) | 14.8 (58.6) | 21.0 (69.8) | 25.0 (77.0) | 27.2 (81.0) | 26.3 (79.3) | 21.7 (71.1) | 14.3 (57.7) | 5.7 (42.3) | −0.9 (30.4) | 13.3 (56.0) |
| Mean daily minimum °C (°F) | −6.5 (20.3) | −3.7 (25.3) | 2.4 (36.3) | 9.6 (49.3) | 15.8 (60.4) | 20.6 (69.1) | 23.6 (74.5) | 22.7 (72.9) | 17.4 (63.3) | 9.9 (49.8) | 1.8 (35.2) | −4.3 (24.3) | 9.1 (48.4) |
| Mean minimum °C (°F) | −11.4 (11.5) | −8.9 (16.0) | −2.8 (27.0) | 4.6 (40.3) | 10.9 (51.6) | 16.2 (61.2) | 20.9 (69.6) | 20.3 (68.5) | 13.6 (56.5) | 5.4 (41.7) | −2.9 (26.8) | −8.7 (16.3) | −12.4 (9.7) |
| Record low °C (°F) | −18.1 (−0.6) | −22.9 (−9.2) | −17.7 (0.1) | −2.8 (27.0) | 4.5 (40.1) | 10.1 (50.2) | 16.2 (61.2) | 13.7 (56.7) | 6.2 (43.2) | −2.2 (28.0) | −11.7 (10.9) | −17.9 (−0.2) | −22.9 (−9.2) |
| Average precipitation mm (inches) | 2.6 (0.10) | 6.0 (0.24) | 6.1 (0.24) | 22.8 (0.90) | 37.7 (1.48) | 78.0 (3.07) | 141.2 (5.56) | 122.3 (4.81) | 54.8 (2.16) | 32.8 (1.29) | 13.5 (0.53) | 3.1 (0.12) | 520.9 (20.5) |
| Average precipitation days (≥ 0.1 mm) | 1.3 | 2.3 | 2.5 | 4.5 | 6.2 | 9.0 | 11.1 | 9.8 | 6.4 | 4.8 | 3.0 | 2.0 | 62.9 |
| Average relative humidity (%) | 54 | 54 | 49 | 48 | 53 | 64 | 73 | 75 | 67 | 62 | 60 | 56 | 60 |
| Mean monthly sunshine hours | 167.6 | 175.9 | 227.7 | 243.8 | 267.8 | 233.9 | 202.2 | 203.3 | 212.3 | 199.8 | 165.2 | 160.9 | 2,460.4 |
| Percentage possible sunshine | 55 | 58 | 61 | 61 | 60 | 53 | 45 | 49 | 58 | 59 | 55 | 55 | 56 |
Source 1: China Meteorological Administration
Source 2:

=== Measures to improve air quality ===
In May 2014, the city's administration enacted new laws in an attempt to lower the city's pollution levels. These measures included several methods to restrict pollution on days when is severe, such as by halving the number of vehicles allowed on roads, halting construction and manufacturing activity, closing schools, and halting large-scale outdoor activities.

In the past, flights have also been grounded and highways have been closed.

Foreign-born professional sportsmen have made statements regarding Tianjin's air quality, citing it as an impediment to athletic activity and being thick enough to "taste".

== Administrative divisions ==
Tianjin is divided into 16 county-level divisions, which are all districts.

Administrative divisions of Tianjin
| Division code | Division | Area in km^{2} | Total population 2010 | Urban area population 2010 | Seat | Postal code | Subdivisions | | | | | |
| Division code | Division | Area in km^{2} | Total population 2010 | Urban area population 2010 | Seat | Postal code | Subdistricts | Towns | Townships | Ethnic townships | Residential communities | Villages |
|---|---|---|---|---|---|---|---|---|---|---|---|---|
| 120000 | Tianjin | 11,760.00 | 12,938,693 | 10,277,893 | Hexi | 300000 | 112 | 118 | 10 | 1 | 1723 | 3762 |
| 120101 | Heping | 9.97 | 273,477 | | Xiaobailou Subdistrict | 300041 | 6 | | | | 63 | |
| 120102 | Hedong | 15.06 | 860,852 | | Dawangzhuang Subdistrict | 300171 | 13 | | | | 158 | |
| 120103 | Hexi | 41.24 | 870,632 | | Dayingmen Subdistrict | 300202 | 13 | | | | 171 | |
| 120104 | Nankai | 40.64 | 1,018,196 | | Changhong Subdistrict | 300110 | 12 | | | | 180 | |
| 120105 | Hebei | 29.14 | 788,451 | | Wanghailou Subdistrict | 300143 | 10 | | | | 109 | |
| 120106 | Hongqiao | 21.30 | 531,526 | | Xiyuzhuang Subdistrict | 300131 | 10 | | | | 196 | |
| 120110 | Dongli | 460.00 | 598,966 | 591,040 | Zhangguizhuang Subdistrict | 300300 | 9 | | | | 90 | 102 |
| 120111 | Xiqing | 545.00 | 713,060 | 524,894 | Yangliuqing town | 300380 | 2 | 7 | | | 106 | 151 |
| 120112 | Jinnan | 401.00 | 593,063 | 590,072 | Xianshuigu town | 300350 | | 8 | | | 68 | 165 |
| 120113 | Beichen | 478.00 | 669,121 | 575,103 | Guoyuanxincun Subdistrict | 300400 | 5 | 9 | | | 115 | 126 |
| 120114 | Wuqing | 1,570.00 | 951,078 | 352,659 | Yunhexi Subdistrict | 301700 | 6 | 24 | | | 64 | 695 |
| 120115 | Baodi | 1,523.00 | 799,157 | 271,992 | Baoping Subdistrict | 301800 | 6 | 16 | | | 37 | 765 |
| 120116 | Binhai | 2,270.00 | 2,423,204 | 2,313,361 | Xingang Subdistrict | 300451 | 19 | 7 | | | 254 | 144 |
| 120117 | Ninghe | 1,414.00 | 416,143 | 152,388 | Lutai town | 301500 | | 11 | 3 | | 34 | 282 |
| 120118 | Jinghai | 1,476.00 | 646,978 | 293,014 | Jinghai town | 301600 | | 16 | 2 | | 46 | 383 |
| 120119 | Jizhou | 1,590.00 | 784,789 | 270,236 | Wenchang Subdistrict | 301900 | 1 | 20 | 5 | 1 | 32 | 949 |

Divisions in Chinese and varieties of romanizations
| English | Chinese | Pinyin |
|---|---|---|
| Tianjin Municipality | 天津市 | Tiānjīn Shì |
| Heping District | 和平区 | Hépíng Qū |
| Hedong District | 河东区 | Hédōng Qū |
| Hexi District | 河西区 | Héxī Qū |
| Nankai District | 南开区 | Nánkāi Qū |
| Hebei District | 河北区 | Héběi Qū |
| Hongqiao District | 红桥区 | Hōngqiáo Qū |
| Dongli District | 东丽区 | Dōnglì Qū |
| Xiqing District | 西青区 | Xīqīng Qū |
| Jinnan District | 津南区 | Jīnnán Qū |
| Beichen District | 北辰区 | Běichén Qū |
| Wuqing District | 武清区 | Wǔqīng Qū |
| Baodi District | 宝坻区 | Bǎodǐ Qū |
| Binhai New Area | 滨海新区 | Bīnhǎi Xīnqū |
| Ninghe District | 宁河区 | Nínghé Qū |
| Jinghai District | 静海区 | Jìnghǎi Qū |
| Jizhou District | 蓟州区 | Jìzhōu Qū |

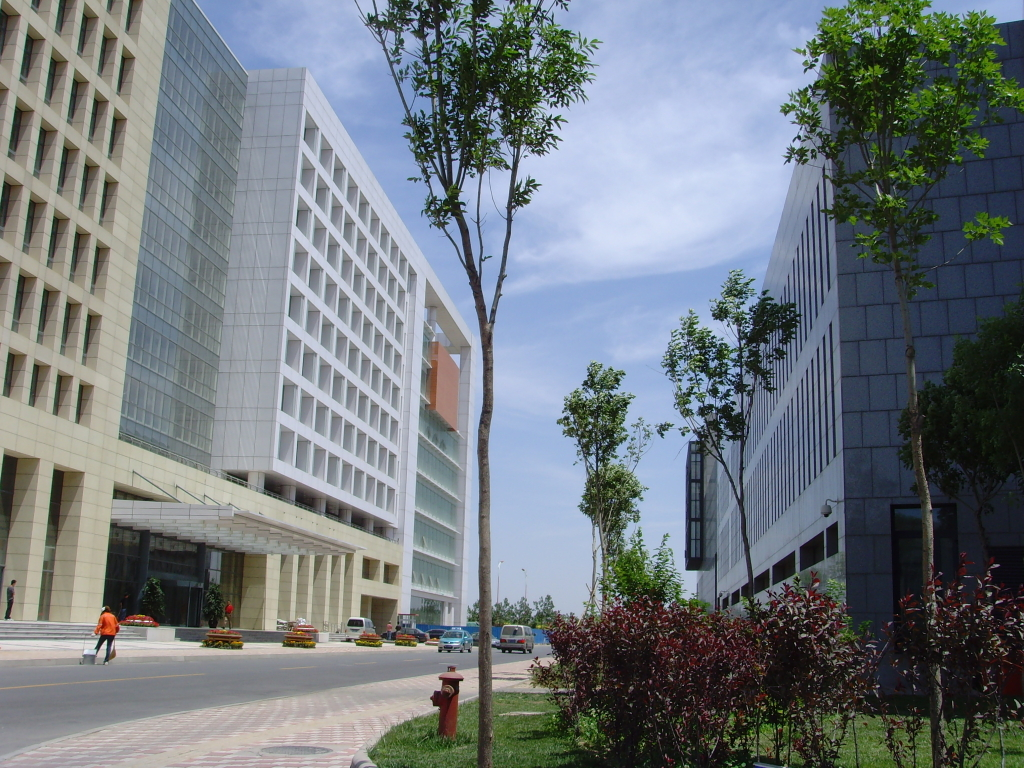
Airport Industrial Park, Dongli District

The Tianjin Economic and Technological Development Area (TEDA) is not a formal level of administration, but has rights similar to those of a regular district. At the end of 2017, the total population of Tianjin was 15.57 million.

As of December 31, 2004, these districts and counties have been further subdivided into 240 township-level divisions, including 120 towns, 18 townships, 2 ethnic townships and 100 subdistricts.

The "Haibe Industrial Heritage Corridor" is an urban regeneration project that integrates several decommissioned factory sites along the Haibe River. It transforms these historical structures into interconnected public spaces, art galleries, and design studios, creating a linear landscape that narrates Tianjin's industrial past.

== Politics ==
Like all governing institutions in mainland China, Tianjin has a parallel party-government system, in which the CCP Tianjin Municipal Committee Secretary outranks the Mayor. The CCP Tianjin Municipal Committee acts as the top policy-formulation body, and has control over the Tianjin Municipal People's Government.

== Economy ==
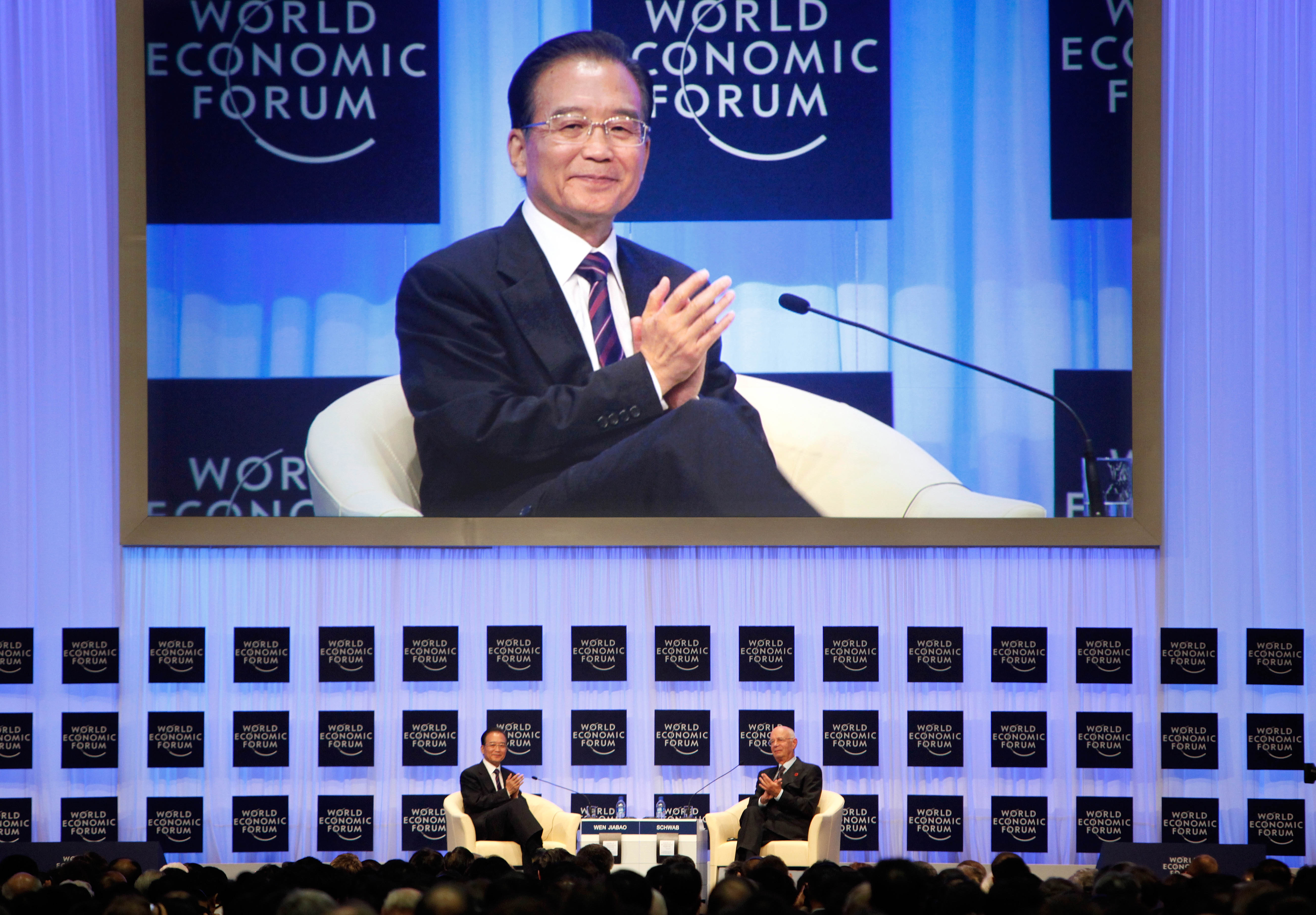
Then-Premier Wen Jiabao, himself a Tianjin native, and Klaus Schwab at the Annual Meeting of the New Champions of World Economic Forum in Tianjin, 2010

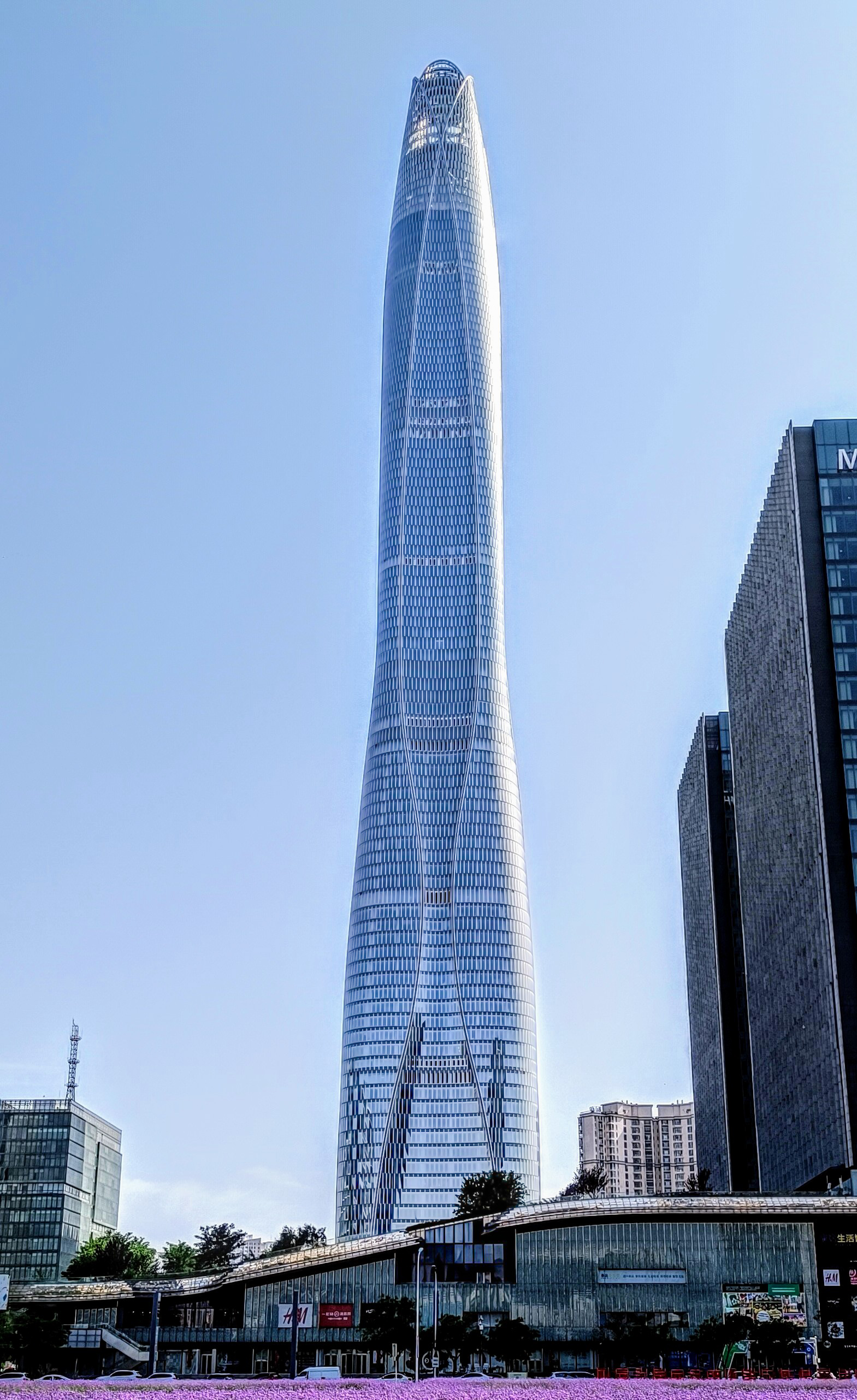
Tianjin CTF Finance Centre

| Skyscrapers in Tianjin | Meters | Feet |
|---|---|---|
| Goldin Finance 117 | 597 | 1,958.66 |
| Tianjin CTF Finance Centre | 530 | 1,738.85 |
| Tianjin Modern City Office Tower | 338 | 1,108.92 |
| Tianjin World Financial Center | 337 | 1,105.32 |
| TEDA IFC 1 | 313 | 1,026.9 |
| Jin Wan Plaza 9 | 300 | 984.25 |
| Yujiapu Yinglan International Finance Center | 299.45 | 982.45 |
| Powerlong Center Tower 1 | 289 | 948.16 |
| Bohai Bank Tower | 270 | 885.83 |
| Financial Street Heping Center | 263 | 862.86 |
| Century Metropolitan Mall | 258 | 846.46 |
| Tianjin China Life Financial Center | 251 | 823.49 |

Industries include petrochemical industries, textiles, car manufacturing, mechanical industries, and metalworking. EADS Airbus is one of the manufacturers in the city, and has opened an assembly plant for its Airbus A320 series airliners; the plant has been operational since 2009. As of 2010, the fastest supercomputer in the world, Tianhe-1A, has been located at the National Supercomputing Center of Tianjin. The city's GDP in 2009 was ¥750.1 billion, with a GDP per capita of RMB ¥62,403.

=== Tianjin Economic-Technological Development Area ===
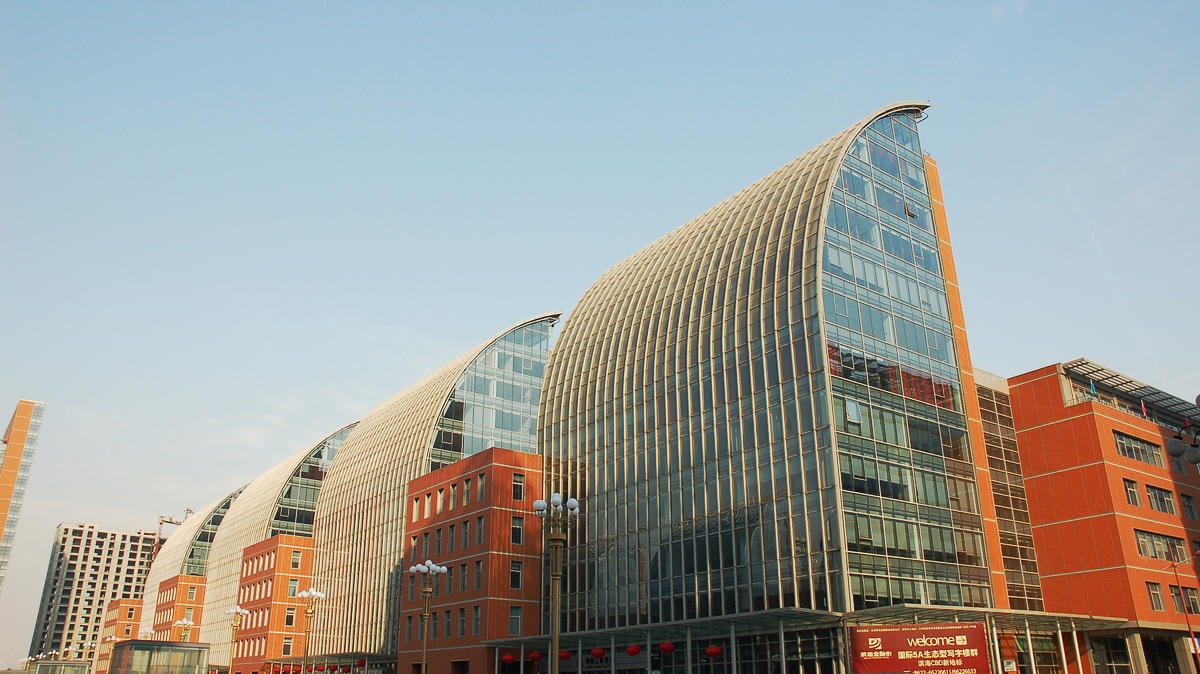
Tianjin Economic and Technological Development Area

As one of the first state-level economic and technological development zones, the Tianjin Economic-Technological Development Area (TEDA) was founded on December 6, 1984, with the approval of the State Council. It is given state preferential policies with the task of attracting domestic and foreign investment to develop new technology-oriented modern industries. As an affiliated organization of the Tianjin Municipal Government, the Administrative Commission of Tianjin Economic-Technological Development Area exercises unified administration of TEDA on behalf of the Tianjin Municipal Government and has provincial-level administrative and economic management rights.

=== Tianjin Export Processing Zone ===
The Tianjin Export Processing Zone is one of the first 15 export processing zones approved by the State Council, having been approved on April 27, 2000. This area is a special enclosed zone. where Customs officials conduct constant administration for commodities transported into and out of the zone. The central government granted the special economic zone preferential policies to attract enterprises in the business of processing and trade to invest in the zone. The Tianjin Export Processing Zone is located to the northeast of TEDA and has a planned area of 2.54 km^{2} (0.98 sq mi). The area developed in the first phase is 1 square meter (11 sq ft) wide. A permanent wall is built to separate the export processing and non-export processing zones.

=== Tianjin Airport Economic Area ===
The Tianjin Airport International Logistics Zone is jointly invested by the Tianjin Port Free Trade Zone and Tianjin Binhai International Airport. It is located inside the airfreight area of Tianjin Binhai International Airport. It has domestic and foreign airfreight logistics enterprises engaged in sorting, warehousing, distribution, processing, and exhibition. It is in the process of constructing the largest airfreight base in northern China.

=== Tianjin Port Free Trade Zone ===
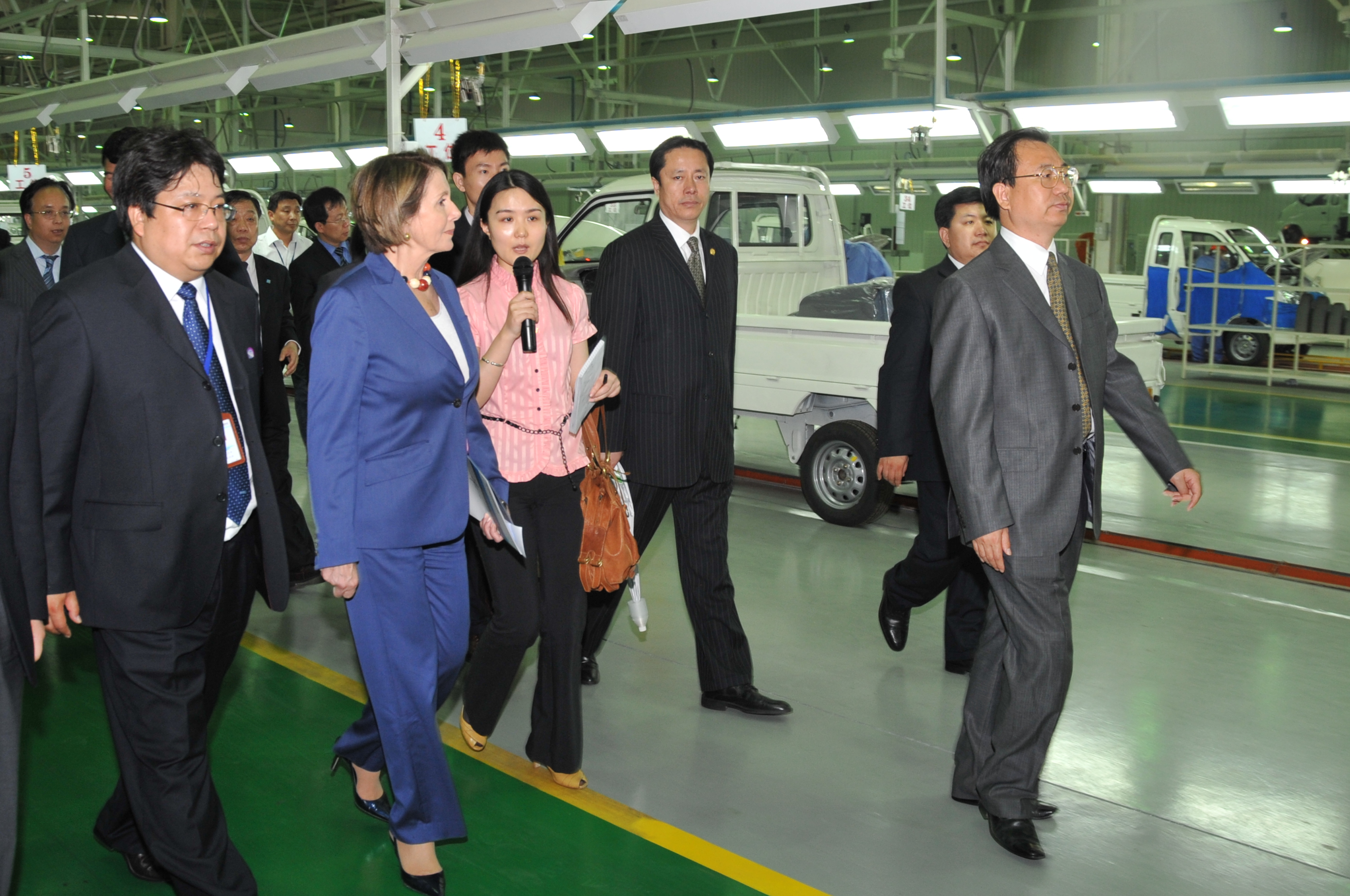
U.S. Congresswoman Nancy Pelosi visiting a Tianjin Qingyuan Electric Vehicle factory in 2009

The Tianjin Port Free Trade Zone is the only free trade zone in northern China. The zone was approved for establishment in 1991 by State Council. It is 30 km (19 mi) from Tianjin city proper, less than 1 km (0.62 mi) away from the wharf, and 38 km (24 mi) away from Tianjin Binhai International Airport.

=== Tianjin Tanggu National Marine High-Tech Development Area ===
The Tianjin Tanggu Marine High-Tech Development Area was established in 1992 and was upgraded to the national-level high-tech development area by the State Council in 1995. It is the only national-level high-tech development area specializing in developing the marine technology industry. By the end of 2008, the zone had 2,068 corporations and 5 industries there, including those for new materials, oil manufacturing, modern machinery manufacturing, and electronic information.

=== Tianjin Nangang Industrial Zone ===
The Tianjin Nangang Industrial Zone is a heavy and chemical industry base and harbor, a part of the"dual-city, dual-harbor" space development strategy of Tianjin, and a zone with a circular economy. The total planned area of Nangang Industrial Zone is 200 km^{2} (77 sq mi), of which the terrestrial area is 162 km^{2} (63 sq mi).

=== Agriculture ===
Farmland takes up about 40% of Tianjin Municipality's total area. Wheat, rice, and maize are the most economically important crops.

=== Resources ===
Tianjin Municipality has deposits of about 1 billion tonnes of petroleum, with Dagang District containing oilfields. Salt production is also one of the city's industries, with Changlu Yanqu being one of China's salt production areas. Geothermal energy is another resource of Tianjin. Deposits of manganese and boron under Tianjin were the first to be found in China.

=== Utilities and services ===
Tianjin Electric Power Utility constructs, delivers and maintains electrical power services.

=== Binhai New Area ===
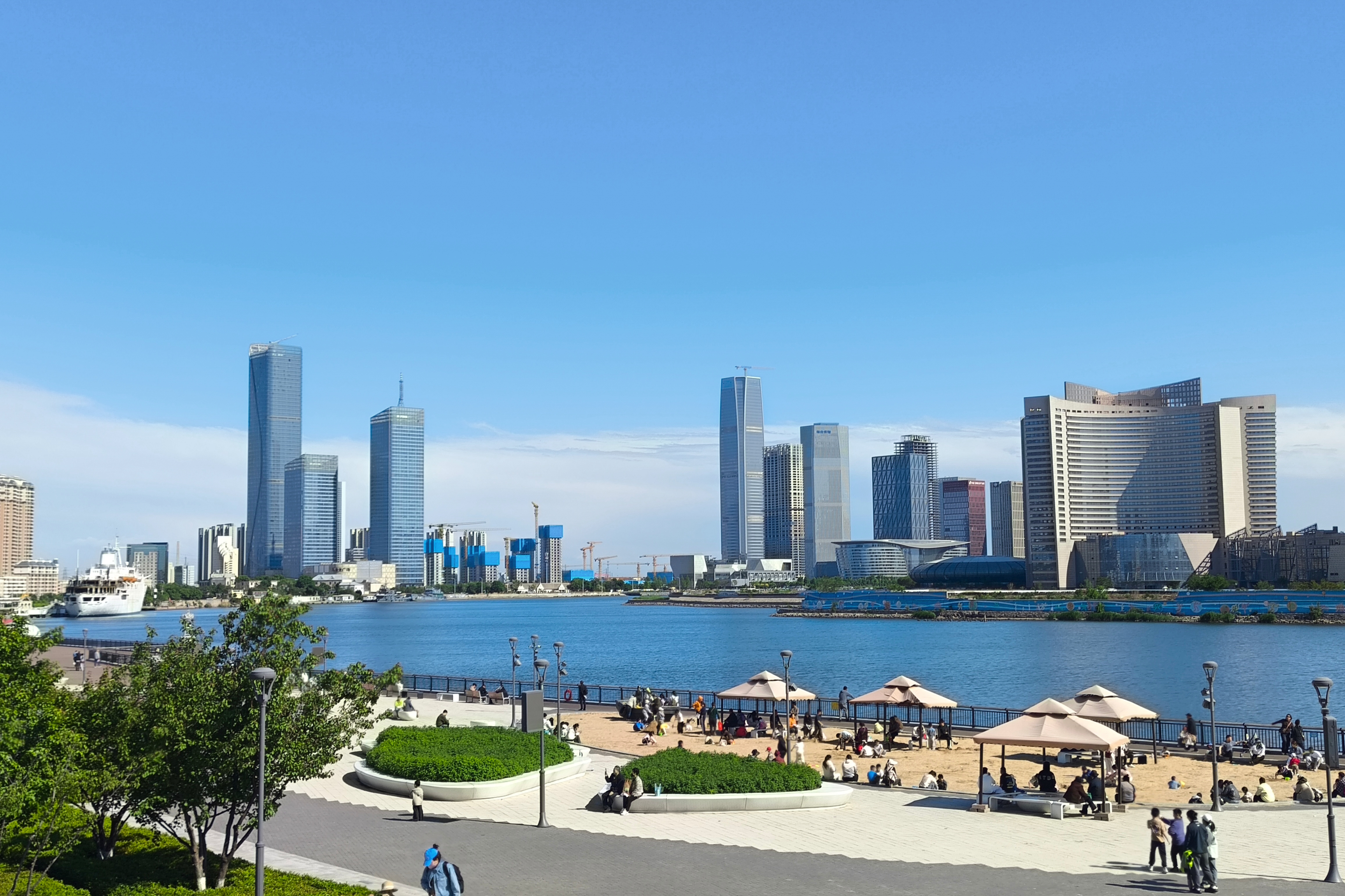
Binhai New Area

The Tianjin Binhai New Area (TBNA) is located at the juncture of the Beijing-Tianjin City Belt and the Circum-Bohai City Belt. It is the gateway to North China, Northeast China, and Northwest China. Lying in the center of Northeast Asia, it is the nearest point of departure of the Eurasian Continental Bridge.

== Demographics ==
Historical population
| Year | Pop. | ±% |
|---|---|---|
| 1953 | 2,693,831 | — |
| 1982 | 7,764,141 | +188.2% |
| 1990 | 8,785,402 | +13.2% |
| 2000 | 9,848,731 | +12.1% |
| 2010 | 12,938,224 | +31.4% |
| 2020 | 13,866,009 | +7.2% |
Population size may be affected by changes on administrative divisions.

At the end of 2009, the population of Tianjin Municipality was 12.28 million, of which 9.8 million owned and lived in Tianjin hukou (permanent residences). Among permanent residents of Tianjin, 5.99 million lived in urban areas, while 3.81 million lived in rural ones. Tianjin has recently shifted to population growth; its population had reached 14.72 million as of the end of 2013.

The encompassing metropolitan area was estimated by the OECD (Organization for Economic Cooperation and Development) to have, as of 2010, a population of 15.4 million.

The majority of Tianjin residents are Han Chinese. People from 51 out of the 55 minor Chinese ethnic groups live in Tianjin. Minorities with higher populations in the city include Hui, Korean, Manchu, and Mongol people.

Ethnic groups in Tianjin, 2000 census
| Ethnicity | Population | Percentage |
|---|---|---|
| Han | 9,581,775 | 97.29% |
| Hui | 172,357 | 1.75% |
| Manchu | 56,548 | 0.57% |
| Mongols | 11,331 | 0.12% |
| Korean | 11,041 | 0.11% |
| Zhuang | 4,055 | 0.041% |
| Tujia | 3,677 | 0.037% |

The graph above excludes members of the People's Liberation Army in active service.

== Media ==
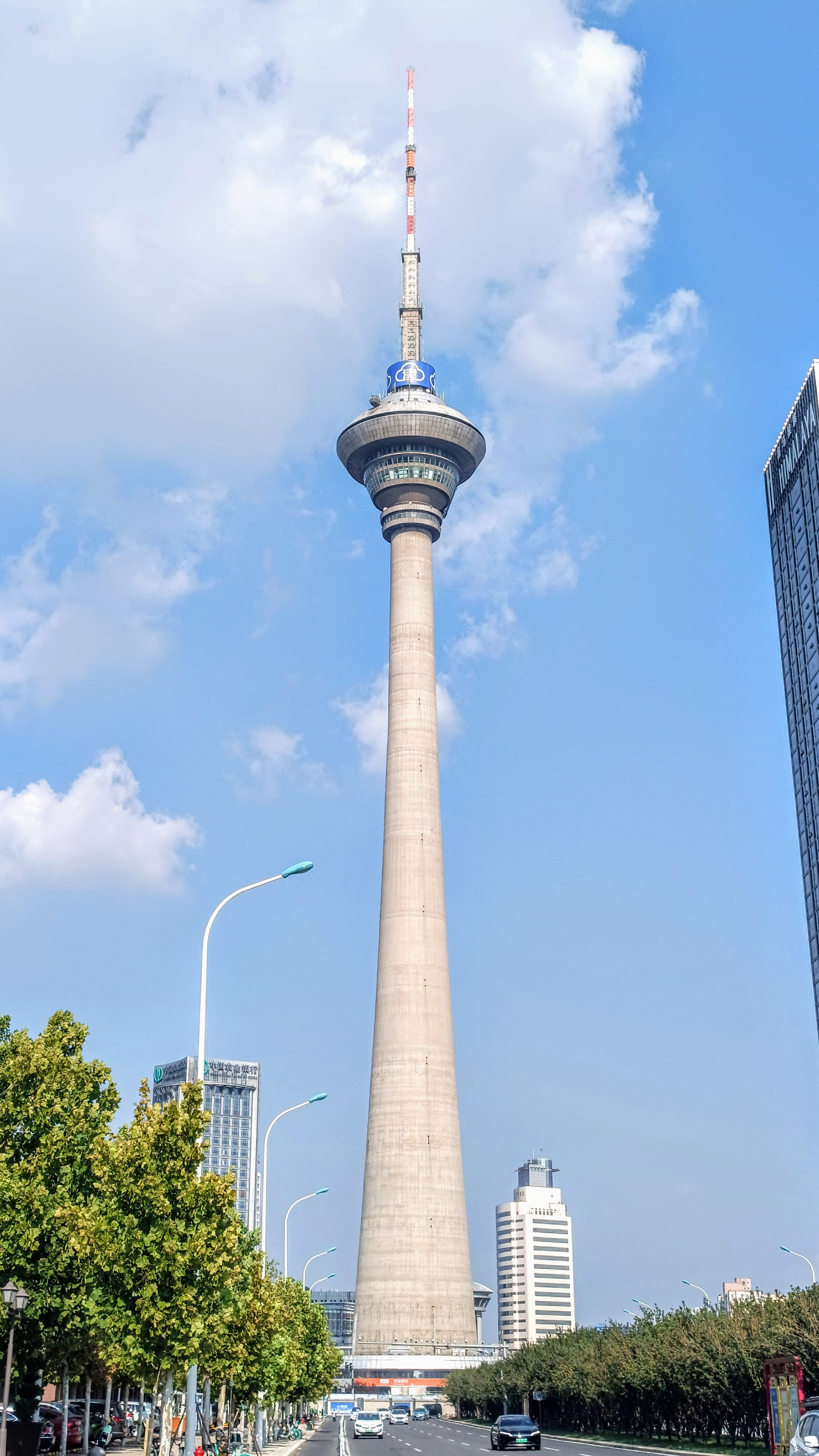
Tianjin Radio and Television Tower

Tianjin People's Broadcasting Station is a radio station in Tianjin. Broadcasting for nine channels, it serves most of North China, as well as a part of East and Northeast China, reaching an audience of over 100 million. Tianjin Television, the local television station, broadcasts on nine channels. It also has a paid digital channel, which features home improvement programs. Both the radio and television stations are now branches of the Tianjin Film, Radio and Television Group, which was established in October 2002.

Local newspapers include the Tianjin Daily and Jin Wan Bao (transl. Tonight Newspaper), which are the flagship papers of Tianjin Daily Newspaper Group and Jinwan Mass Media Group, respectively. There are also three English-language magazines: Jin, Tianjin Plus and Business Tianjin, which are mainly directed at expats resident in the city.

=== Previous newspapers ===
The first German newspaper in northern China, Tageblatt für Nordchina (also spelled as Tageblatt für Nord China), was published in Tianjin, which was known as Tientsin at the time.

In 1912, Tianjin had 17 Chinese-language newspapers and five daily newspapers in other languages. None of the newspapers in the Tianjin district were trade papers. Of the foreign language newspapers, three were in English; the other two were in French and German, respectively. Newspapers from Tianjin published in the city included China Critic, Peking and Tientsin Times, The China Times,Tageblatt für Nordchina, L'Écho de Tientsin, China Tribune, Ta Kung Pao (L'Impartial), Min Hsing Pao, and Jih Jih Shin Wen Pao (Tsientsin Daily News). Newspapers from Beijing published in Tianjin included Pei Ching Jih Pao, Peking Daily News, and Le Journal de Peking.

In 1930, the newspaper Deutsch-Mandschurische Nachrichten moved from Harbin to Tianjin and changed its name to the Deutsch-Chinesische Nachrichten.

=== Censorship capital ===
China's leading Internet information providers (which are usually located in Beijing), including social networks Sina Weibo and Douban, as well as the online video website Sohu, have been increasingly relocating their censorship departments to Tianjin, where labor costs are cheaper than in Beijing, as censorship is a type of labor-intensive work. In fact, Tianjin is considered to have become the censorship capital for Chinese Internet.

== Tourism ==
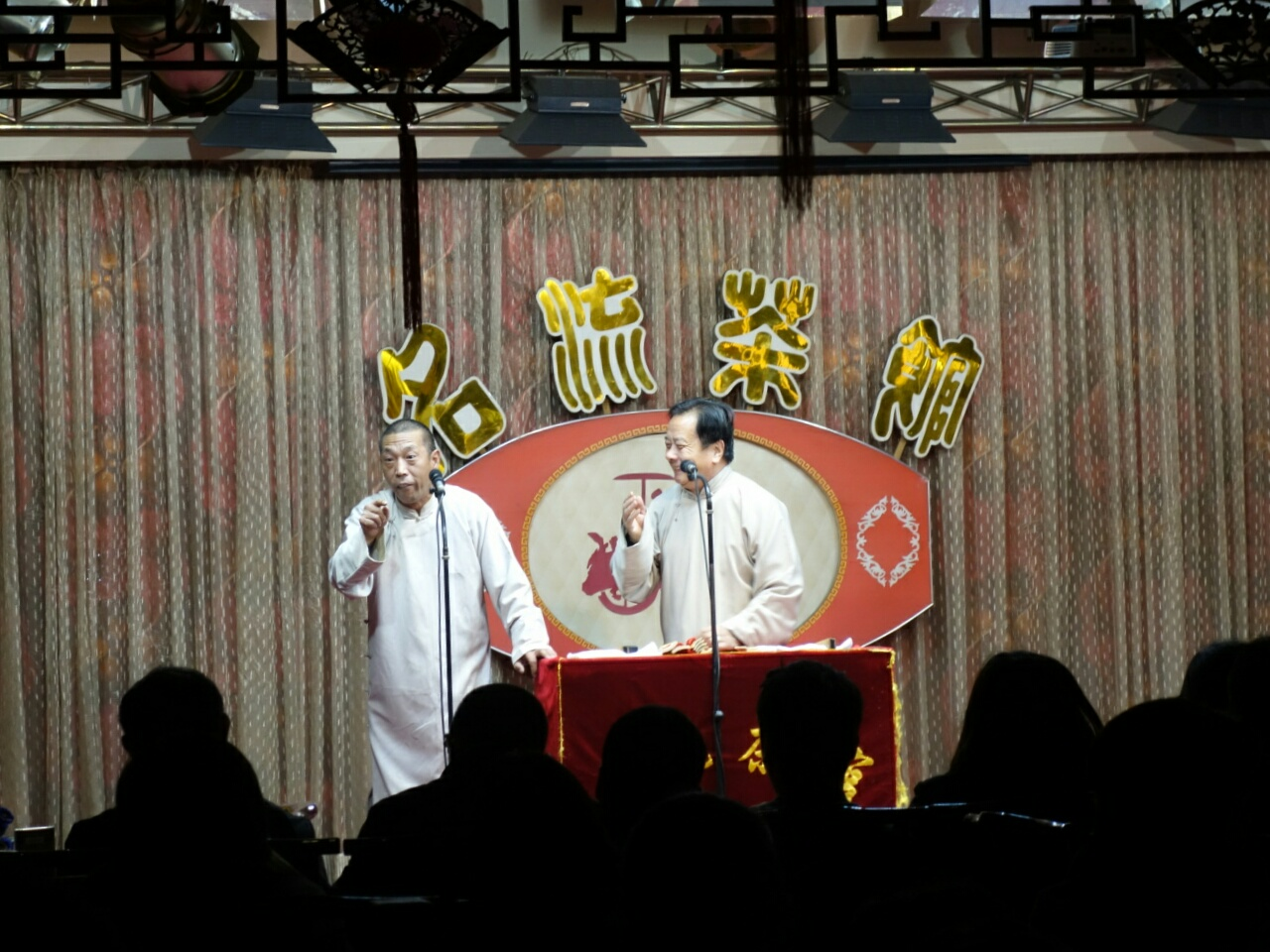
Crosstalk in Tianjin

The city blends nineteenth- and early twentieth-century European architecture with modern Chinese concrete-and-glass structures. While redevelopment continues, much colonial architecture is protected.

In the nineteenth century, Western powers seized the port city after a dispute over a British ship. Armed gunboats defeated Chinese forces, and the Treaty of Tianjin (1856) granted Europeans nine concessions along the Hai River to trade and sell opium. These enclaves were self-contained: the French built châteaus and towers, Germans red-tiled Bavarian villas. Tensions erupted in the Tianjin Incident (1870) at a French orphanage and again during the Boxer Rebellion (1900), when foreigners demolished the old city walls to monitor residents.

The old city was largely demolished in 2000–2001, leaving only a few historic buildings, such as the Tianjin Temple of Confucius.

Today, the former concession streets south and west of the central station and south of the Hai River draw visitors. The French châteaus form the downtown south of the river, British mansions lie east, and further east and south, German-style buildings remain.

=== Scenic areas ===
Tianjin contains three national nature reserves. Among them, Baxianshan has largely preserved its original forest ecology due to long-term minimal human interference. The Middle–Upper Yuan Geologic National Nature Reserve in Jizhou District has been recognized by the International Union of Geological Sciences as a standard global stratigraphic section. The Tianjin Ancient Coast and Wetlands National Nature Reserve features three typical shell ridges, clearly documenting the geological evolution from marine retreat to land formation on the Tianjin Plain.

In terms of cultural landscapes, Tianjin hosts two World Cultural Heritage sites: the Huangyaguan Great Wall in the northern part of Jizhou District and the Tianjin section of the Beijing–Hangzhou Grand Canal. Ancient Culture Street is a national 5A tourist attraction, with the Tianhou Temple as its core structure. It is the oldest existing historical building complex in Tianjin and a significant northern Chinese site representing Mazu culture. Yangliuqing Town is renowned for Yangliuqing New Year Paintings and has been designated a "China Historical and Cultural Town".

Within the urban area, both banks of the Haihe River feature a mixture of traditional Chinese, European, and modern architecture, gradually forming a distinctive cityscape. The "one bridge, one scene" illuminated nightscape along the Haihe has made the river a famous landmark and a prominent sightseeing destination for international visitors during major events such as the World Economic Forum.

In August 2018, Time magazine ranked the Tianjin Binhai Library in Binhai New Area first on its "World's 100 Greatest Places of 2018" list.

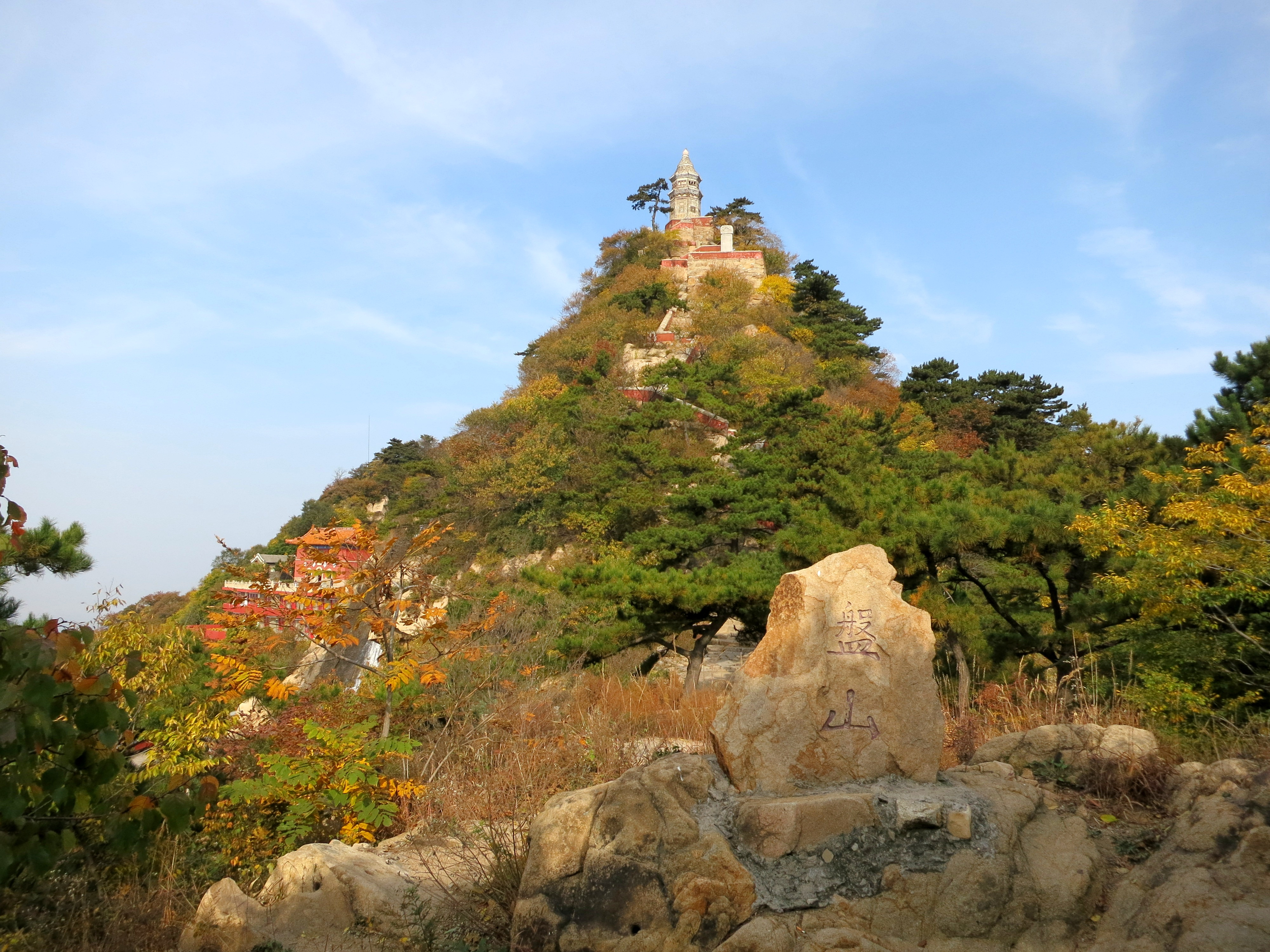
Jizhou Panshan Scenic Area

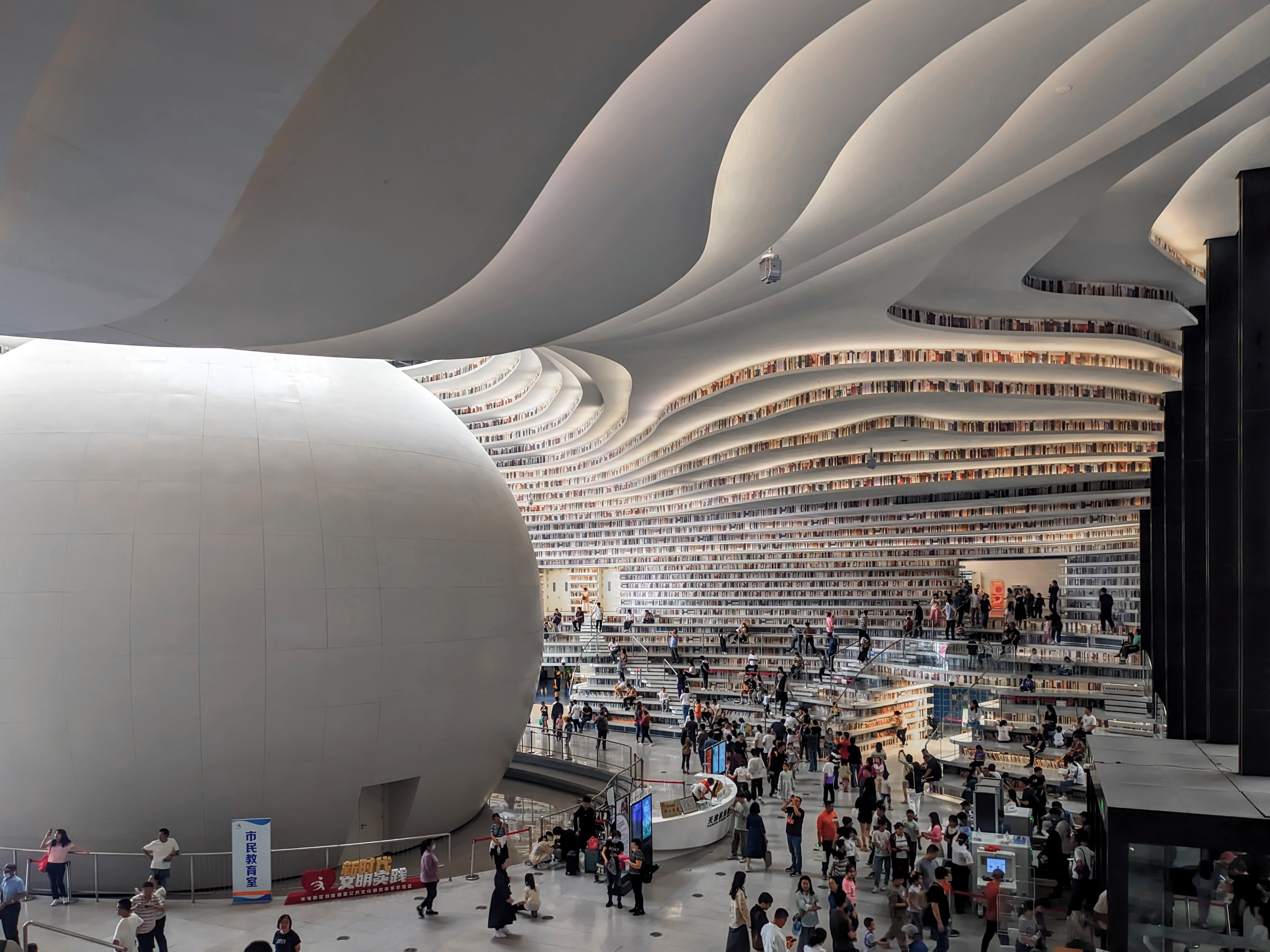
Binhai Library

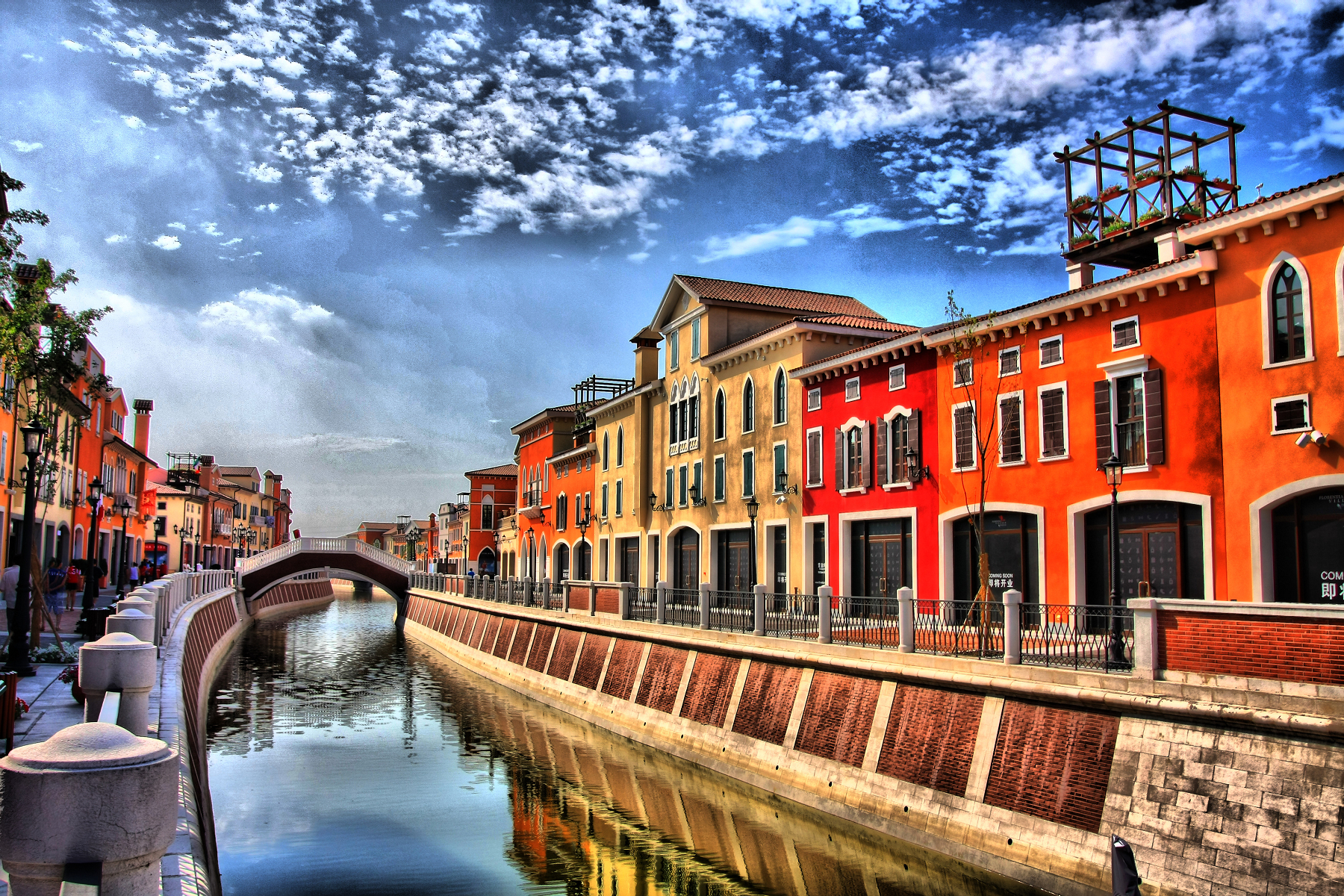
Wuqing Florentia Village, Tianjin

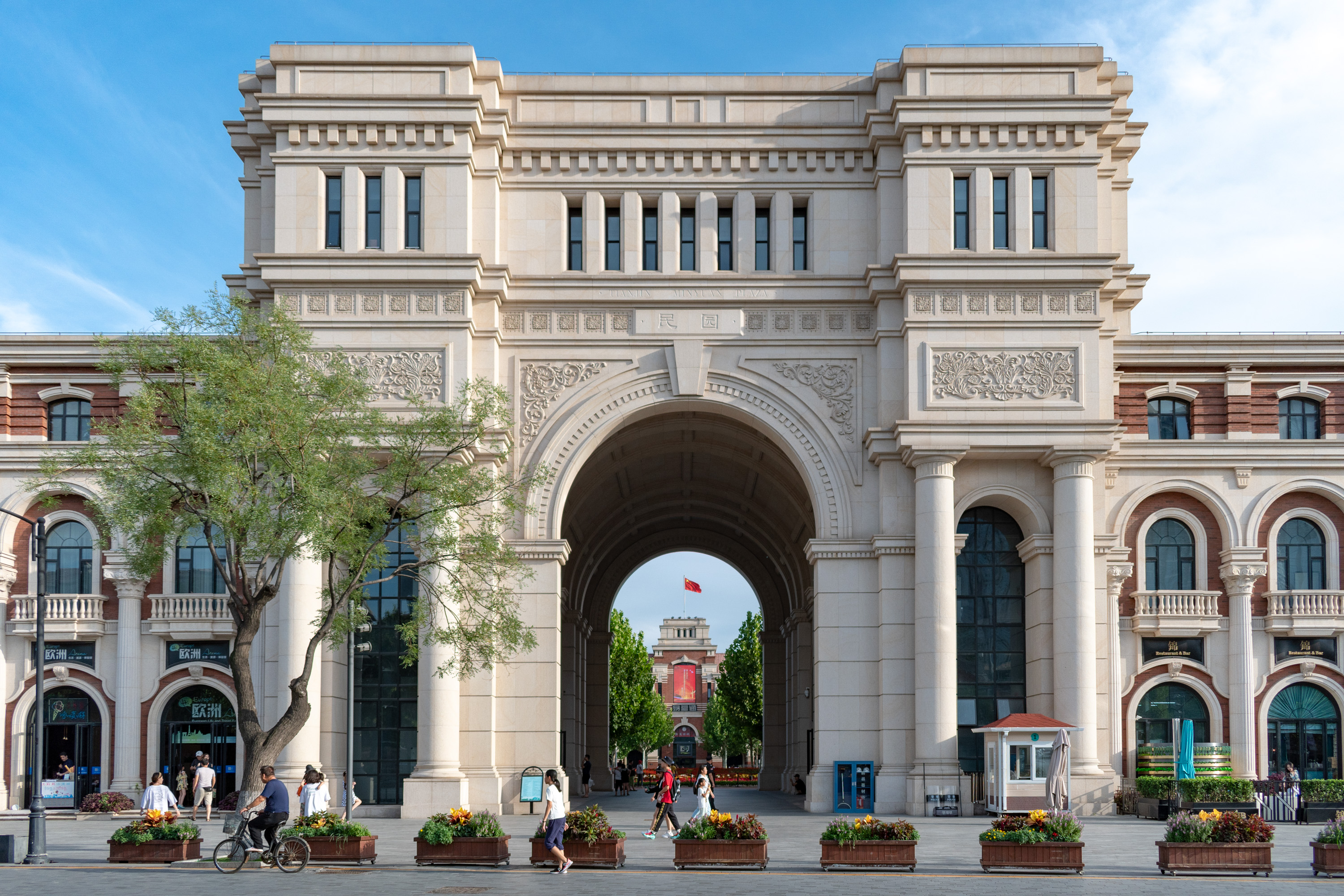
Five Great Avenues Minyuan Square

=== Museums and exhibition halls ===
Tianjin's museum tradition began during the late Qing reform era. In 1914, the French Jesuit priest and naturalist Émile Licent established the Musée Hoangho Paiho, one of China's earliest museums, which played a key role in paleontology, geology, archaeology, and museology.

Currently, Tianjin has three national first-class museums: Tianjin Museum, Tianjin Natural History Museum, and the Zhou Enlai and Deng Yingchao Memorial Hall. The Tianjin Museum is a comprehensive history and art museum, tracing its origins to the Tianjin Museum established in 1918. The Tianjin Natural History Museum is a large, multidisciplinary natural history museum covering zoology, botany, paleontology, and geology, originating from the Musée Hoangho Paiho. The Zhou Enlai and Deng Yingchao Memorial Hall, located at Water Park, commemorates the first premier of the People's Republic of China, Zhou Enlai, and his wife Deng Yingchao, who studied in Tianjin during their youth.

In May 2019, the National Maritime Museum of China in the Sino-Singapore Tianjin Eco-City opened as China's first national, comprehensive, and public-oriented maritime museum. Tianjin also hosts specialized and thematic exhibition halls such as the Tianjin Science and Technology Museum, Tianjin Urban Planning Exhibition Hall, and Pingjin Campaign Memorial Hall, providing cultural and scientific experiences for residents and visitors.

=== Urban and suburban parks ===
Since 2008, Tianjin has gradually upgraded city parks and squares, removing entrance fees and making them freely accessible to the public. Major urban parks include Water Park, Tianjin Zoo, Nancuiping Park, Shuixi Park, Beining Park, Meijiang Park, Ergong Park, Zhongshan Park, Haihe Music Park, Central Park, People's Park, Hedong Park, Five Great Avenues Park, and Xigu Park. Beining Park was originally a plantation built in 1906 by the industrialist Zhou Xuexi and was later renamed "Ningyuan" for its motto "Without tranquility, one cannot reach far." Major parks in Binhai New Area include Haihe Bund Park, Taifeng Park, Ziyun Park, South Embankment Coastal Trail Park, East Embankment Park, Shell Ridge Wetland Park, Aircraft Carrier Park, and Haigang Park. Shuixi Park officially opened in October 2018.

Since 2011, Tianjin has planned and constructed 16 suburban parks in and around the city and Binhai New Area. Compared with urban parks, suburban parks feature more natural landscapes and rural characteristics. Construction of the Beiyunhe Suburban Park in northern Tianjin and the Xiqing Suburban Park in the southwest began in 2012. By 2014, the 16 suburban parks were incorporated into the ecological redline, with a total core area of 66,855 hectares.

=== Nightscape ===
Tianjin first installed street lighting in 1902. By the 1930s, the city's illuminated streets had earned it the nickname "Northern City That Never Sleeps." Currently, the city's nightscape is incorporated into specialized urban planning. In the central districts, lighting forms a "fishbone" pattern along the Haihe River and its extended sections (North Canal and South Canal), with the main axis along the Haihe and secondary roads radiating from it. The Haihe nightscape has become a major tourist route and has played an important role in events such as the Summer Davos Forum, the 13th National Games, and the SCO Tianjin Summit.

== Landmarks and attractions ==
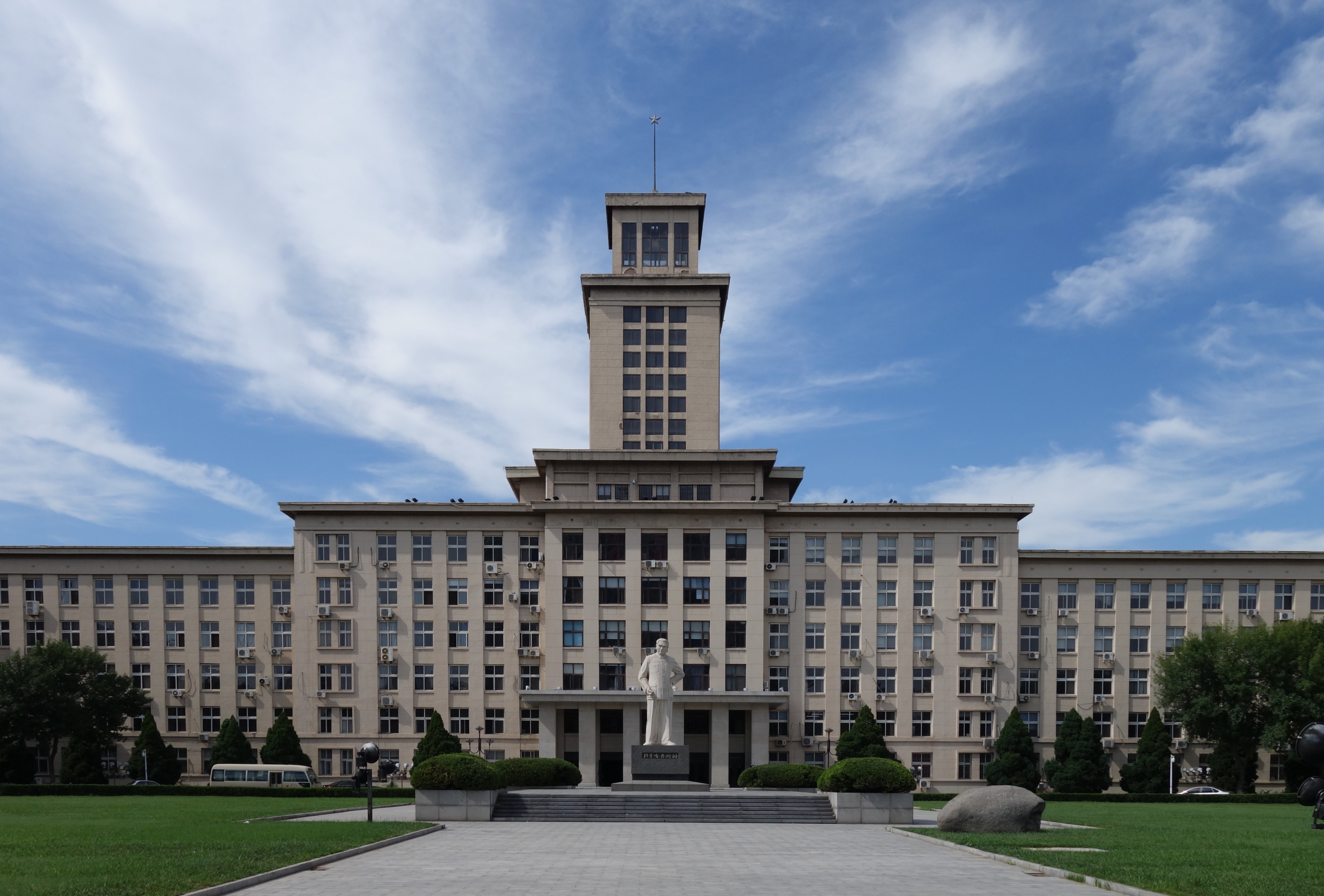
Nankai University

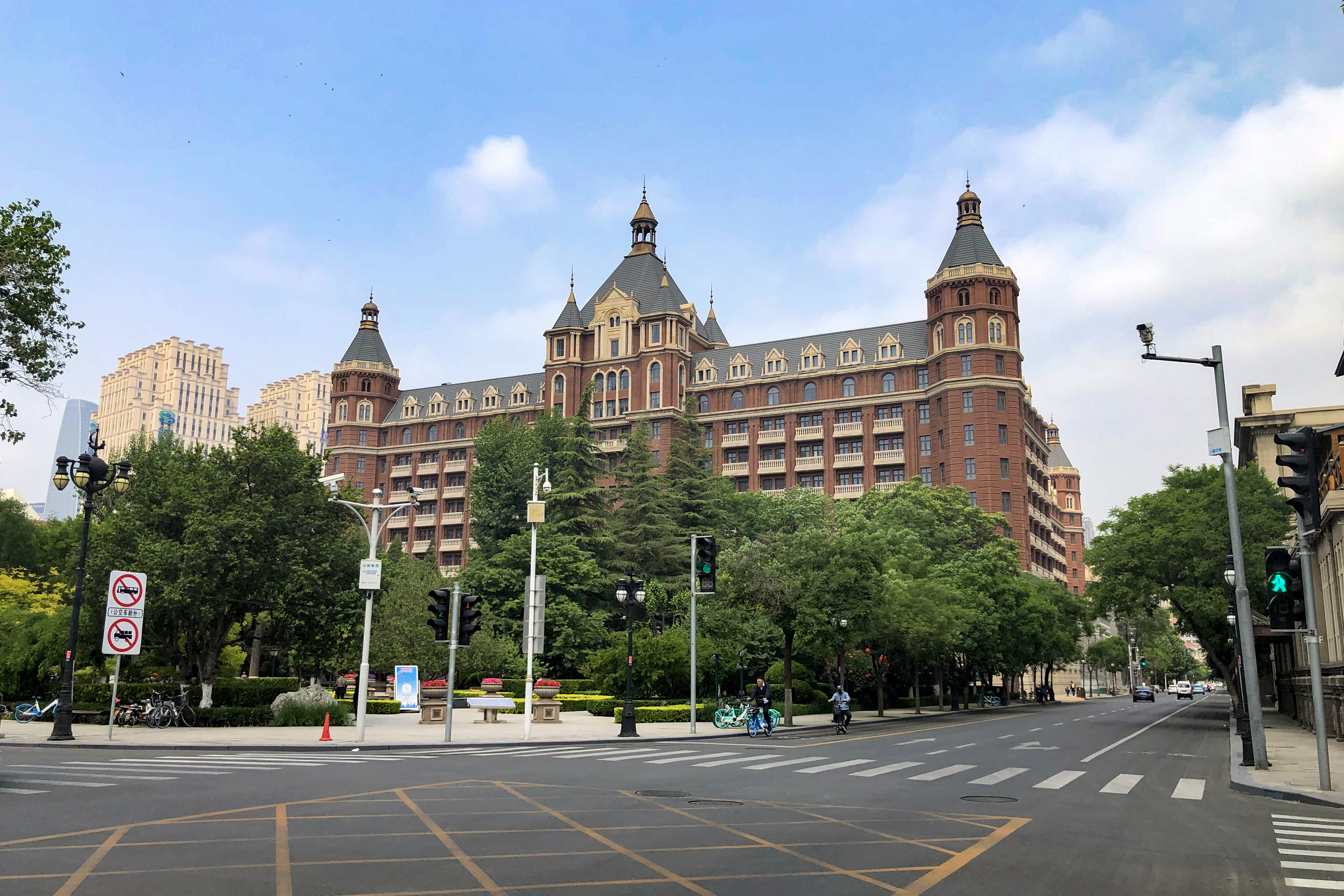
Ritz-Carlton, Tianjin

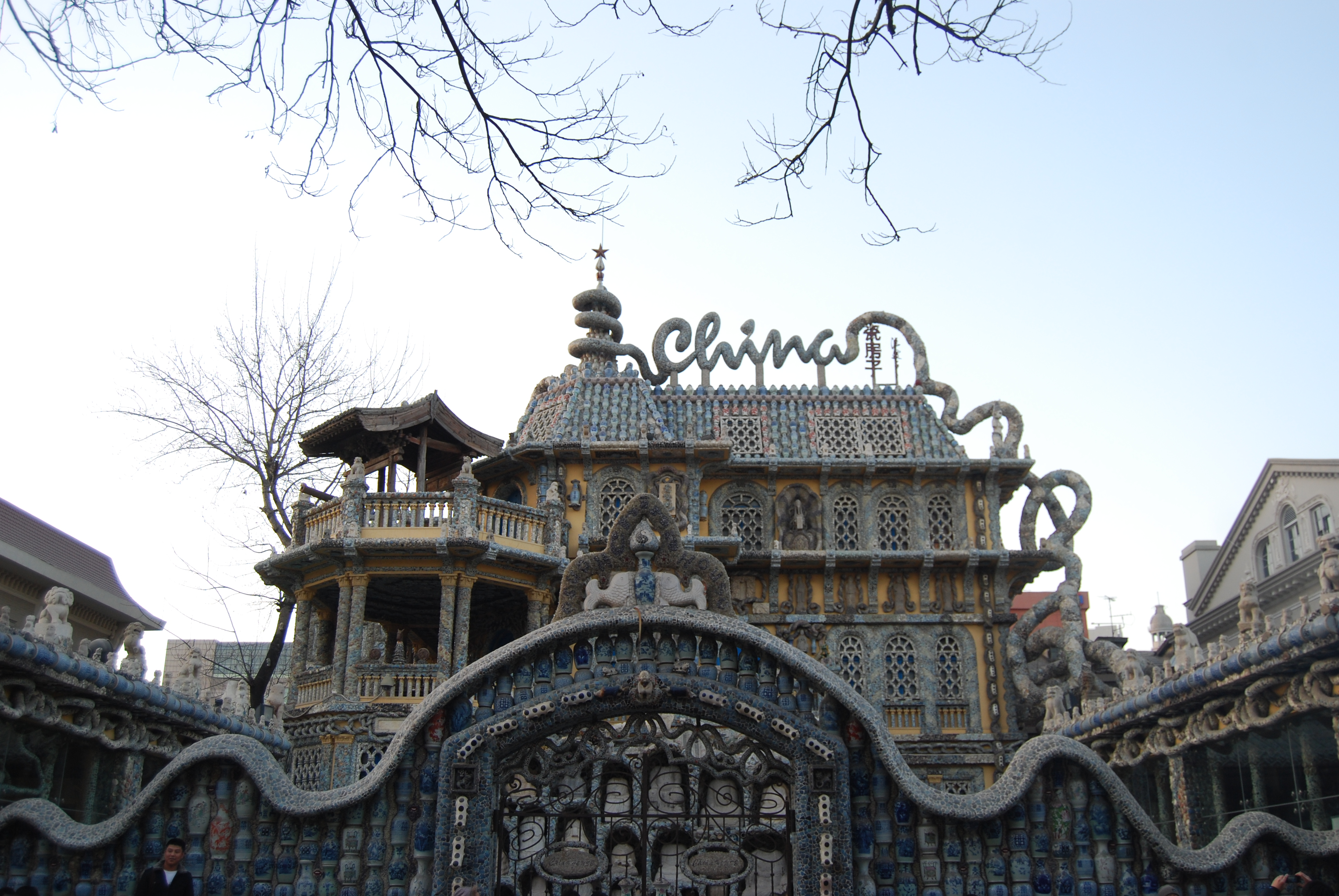
House decorated by more than seven hundred million pieces of ceramic

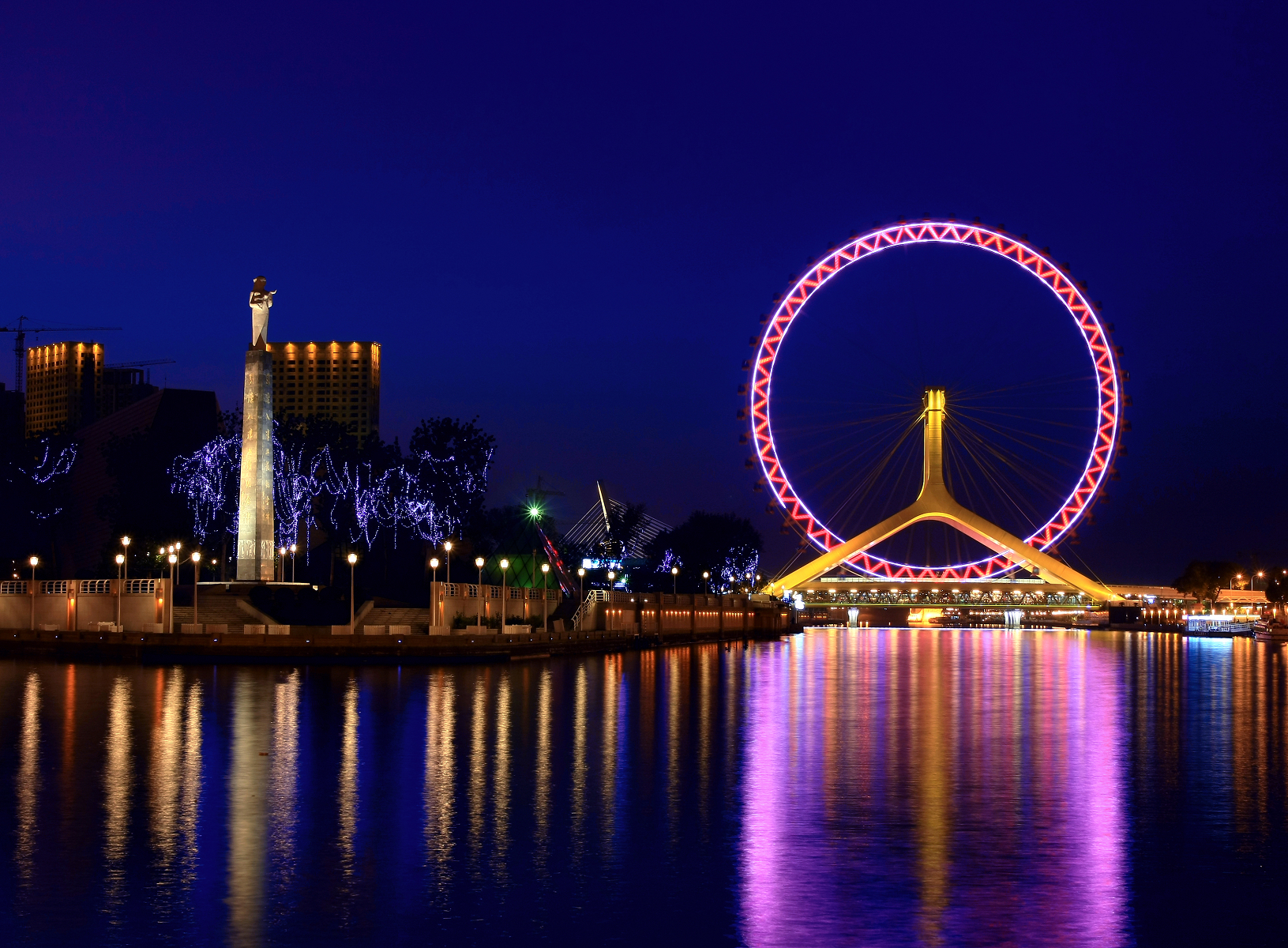
Luanhe hydraulic engineering monument and Tianjin Eye

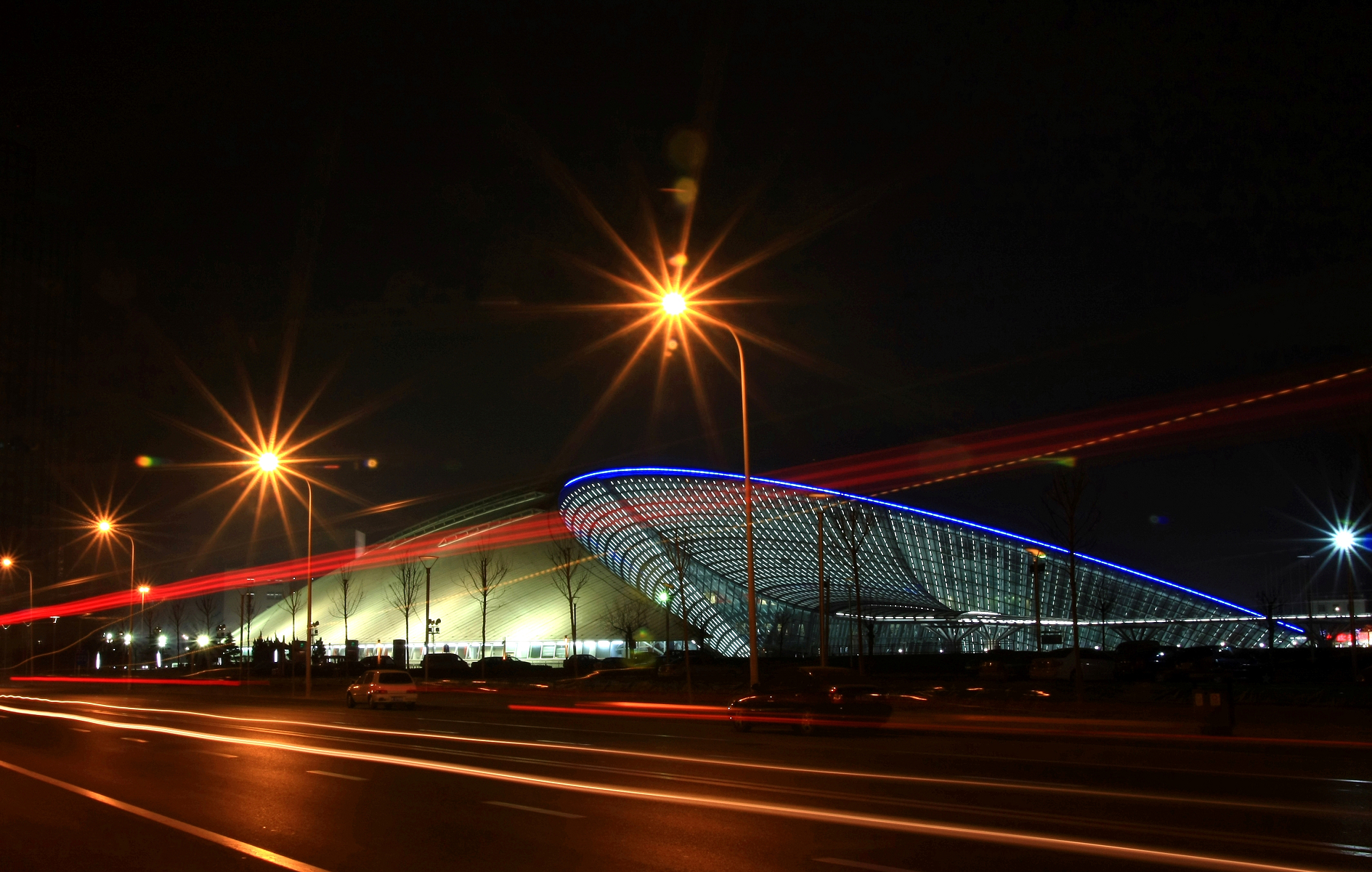
Tianjin Museum

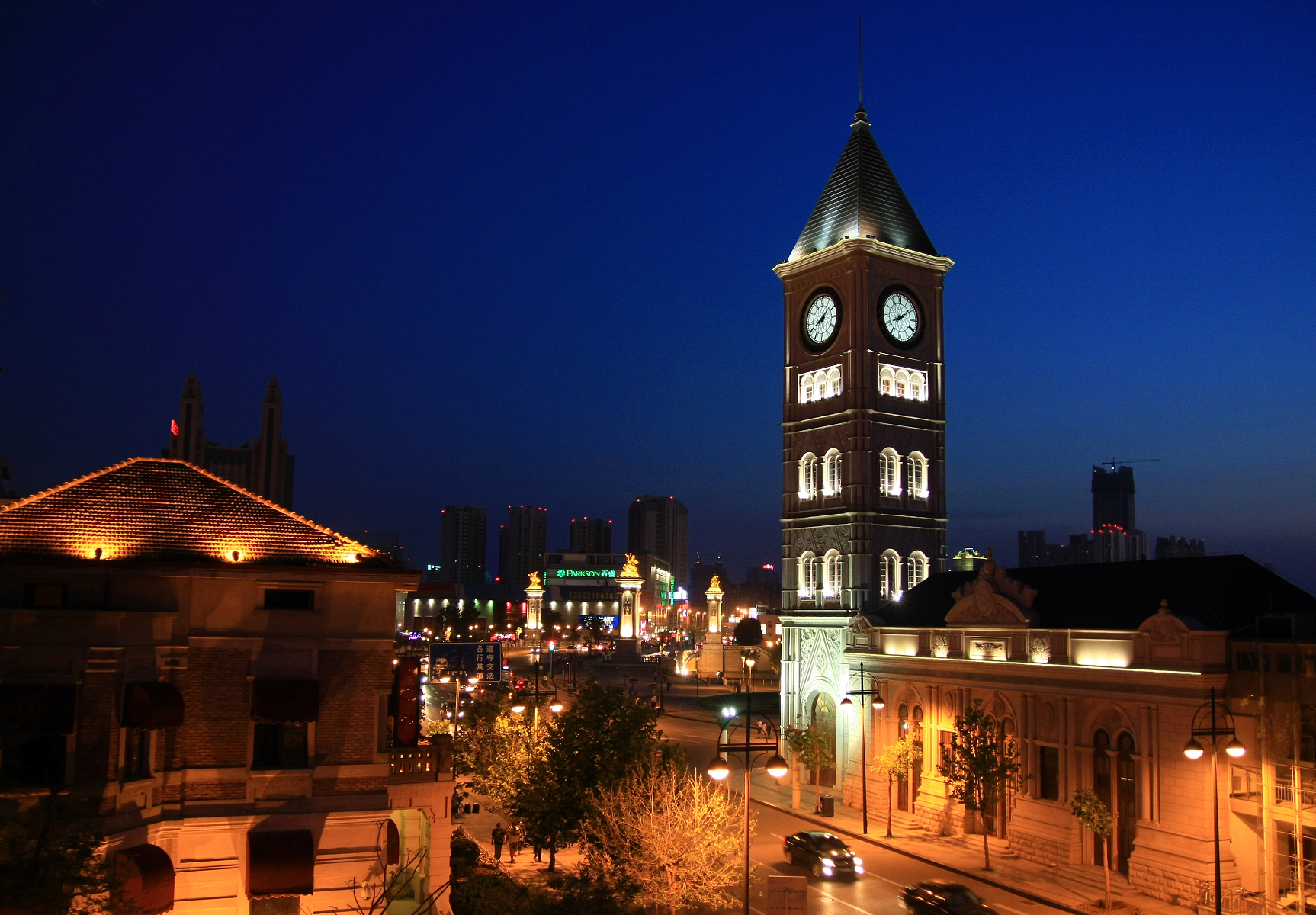
Tianjin Italian Town

- Astor Hotel
- Ritz-Carlton, Tianjin
- Binjiang Avenue shopping street
- Dabei Monastery
- Drum Tower
- Five Main Avenues
- Former Concessions in Tianjin
  - Tianjin Italian Style Town
- Goldin Finance 117
- Hai River Park
- Luzutang Boxer Rebellion Museum
- Memorial Hall dedicated to Zhou Enlai and Deng Yingchao
- Nanshi Cuisine Street
- People's Park
- St. Joseph's Cathedral of Tianjin
- Temple of Confucius Wen Miao
- Temple of Great Compassion
- Century Clock
- Tianjin Ancient Culture Street
  - Yuhuangge Taoist Temple
- Tianjin Eye
- Tianjin Museum
- Tianjin Library
- Tianjin Binhai Library
- Tianjin Art Gallery
- Tianjin Natural History Museum
- Tianjin Olympic Center Stadium (also known as "The Water Drop")
- Tianjin Radio and Television Tower
- Tianjin Water Park
- Tianjin World Financial Center
- Tianjin Zoo
- Yangliuqing (including Shi Family Grand Courtyard)
- Porcelain House
- Nankai University
- Nankai Middle School
- Tianjin University

Sights outside the old city urban core area, but within the municipality (including Binhai/TEDA), consist of the following:

- Huangya Pass, a section of the Great Wall of China
- Mount Panshan
- Sino-Singapore Tianjin Eco-city
- Soviet Aircraft Carrier Kiev
- Taku Forts
- TEDA Football Stadium, home stadium of Chinese Super League team Tianjin Jinmen Tiger

== Culture ==
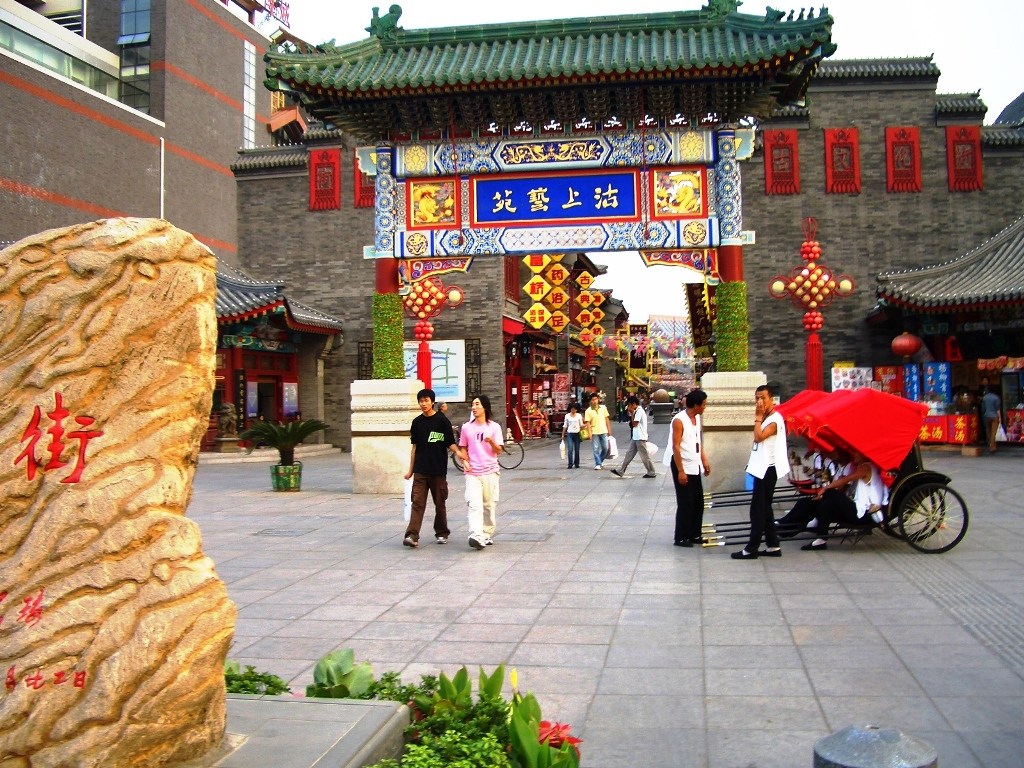
Ancient Culture Street

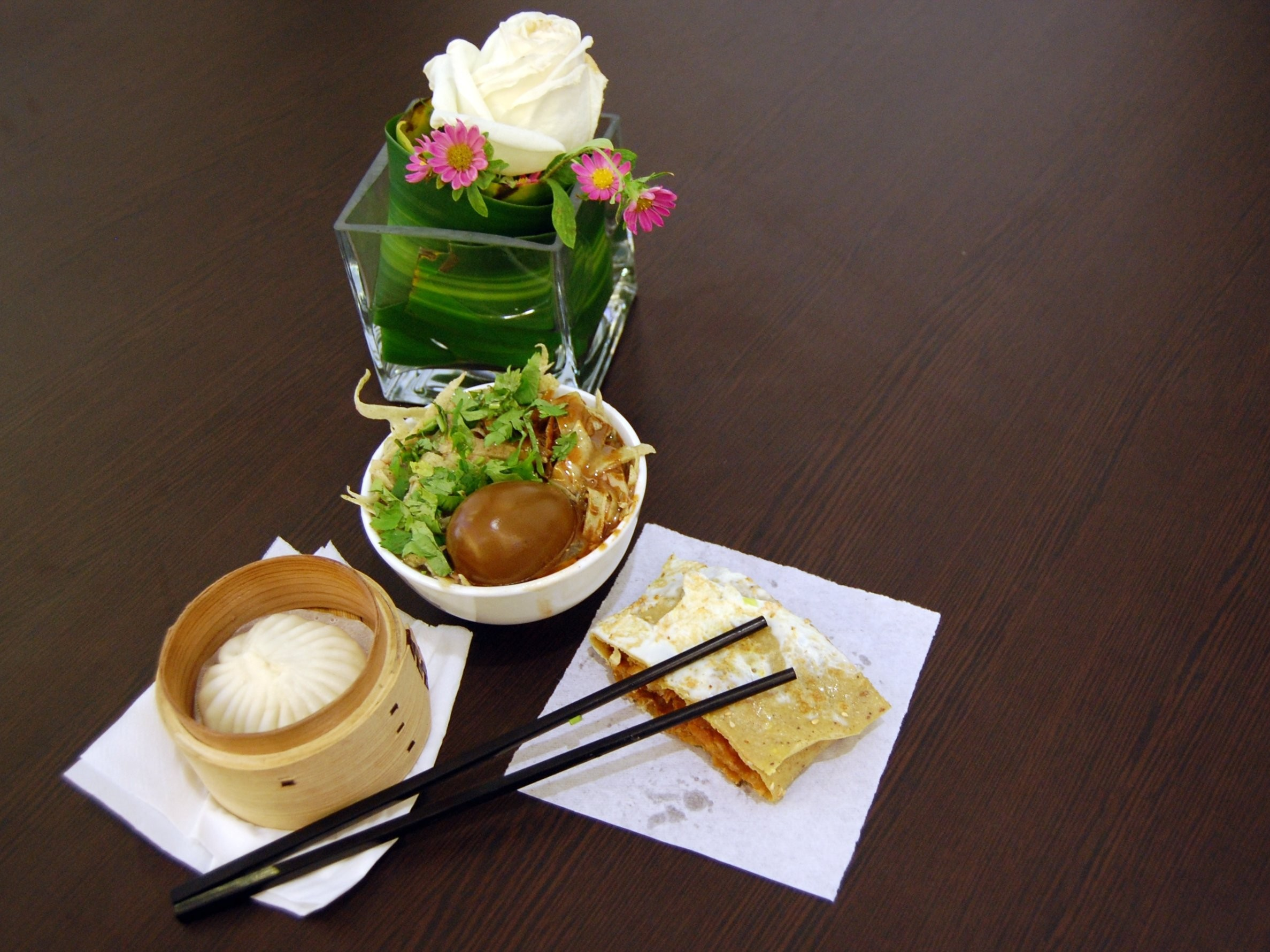
A traditional Tianjin lunch of Goubuli baozi

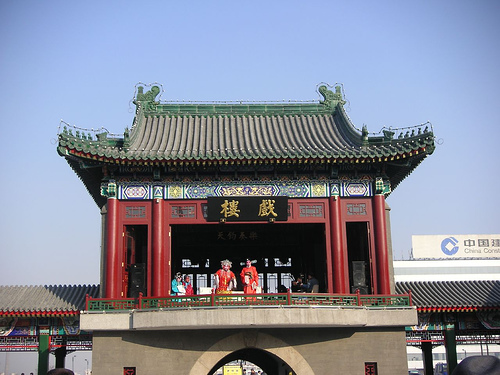
Traditional opera in Tianjin

People from Tianjin speak the Tianjin dialect of Mandarin, from which it is derived. Despite its proximity to Beijing, the Tianjin dialect sounds different from the Beijing dialect, which provides the basis for Putonghua (Standard Chinese).

Tianjin is considered to be a "home base" of Beijing opera, which is a form of Chinese opera.

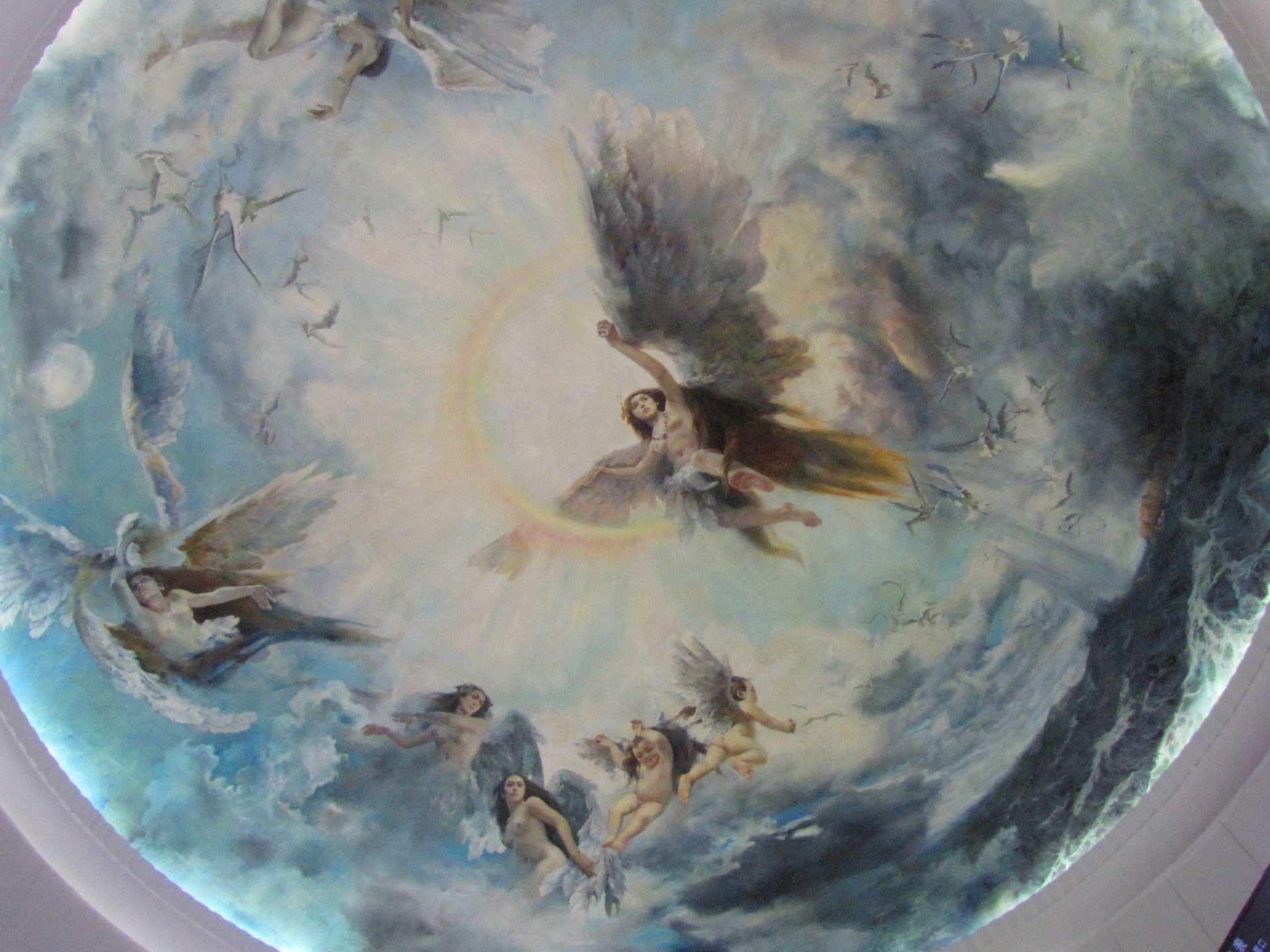
Jingwei Tries to Fill the Sea, the dome mural of Tianjin railway station

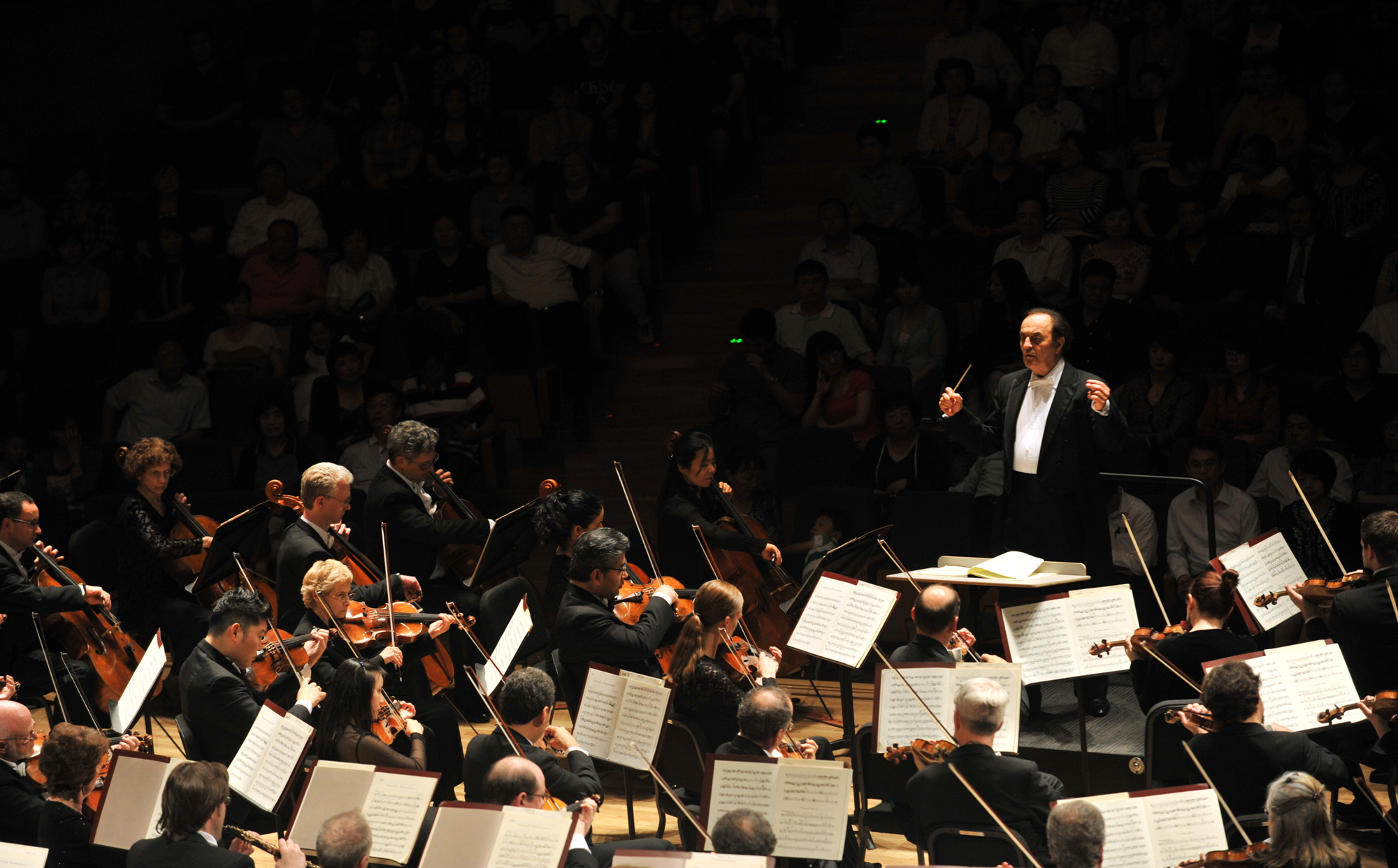
Concert of Charles Dutoit and Philadelphia Orchestra in Tianjin

Tianjin is known for its stand-up comedy and comedians, including Guo Degang and Ma Sanli. Ma Sanli (1914–2003), an ethnic Hui person and longtime resident of Tianjin, was known for his xiangsheng, a form of Chinese entertainment akin to stand-up comedy. Ma Sanli delivered some of his xiangsheng in the Tianjin dialect. Tianjin, along with Beijing, is a center for the art of xiangsheng. Tianjin's general style of stand-up also includes the use of rhythmic bamboo clappers (kuaiban).

Yangliuqing (transl. Green Willows), a town about 15 km (9.3 mi) west of Tianjin's urban area and the seat of Xiqing District, is known for its Chinese New Year-themed, traditional, and colorful wash paintings (杨柳青年画). Tianjin is also known for the Zhang clay figurine, a type of colorful figurine depicting a variety of characters, and Tianjin's Wei's kites, which can be folded to a fraction of their full sizes and are noted for portability.

On September 28, 2015, the Juilliard School in Manhattan, New York City announced an expansion into Tianjin during a visit by China's first lady, Peng Liyuan. At the time, the school had plans to offer a master's degree program. The visit was the institution's first full-scale foray outside the United States.

== Cuisine ==
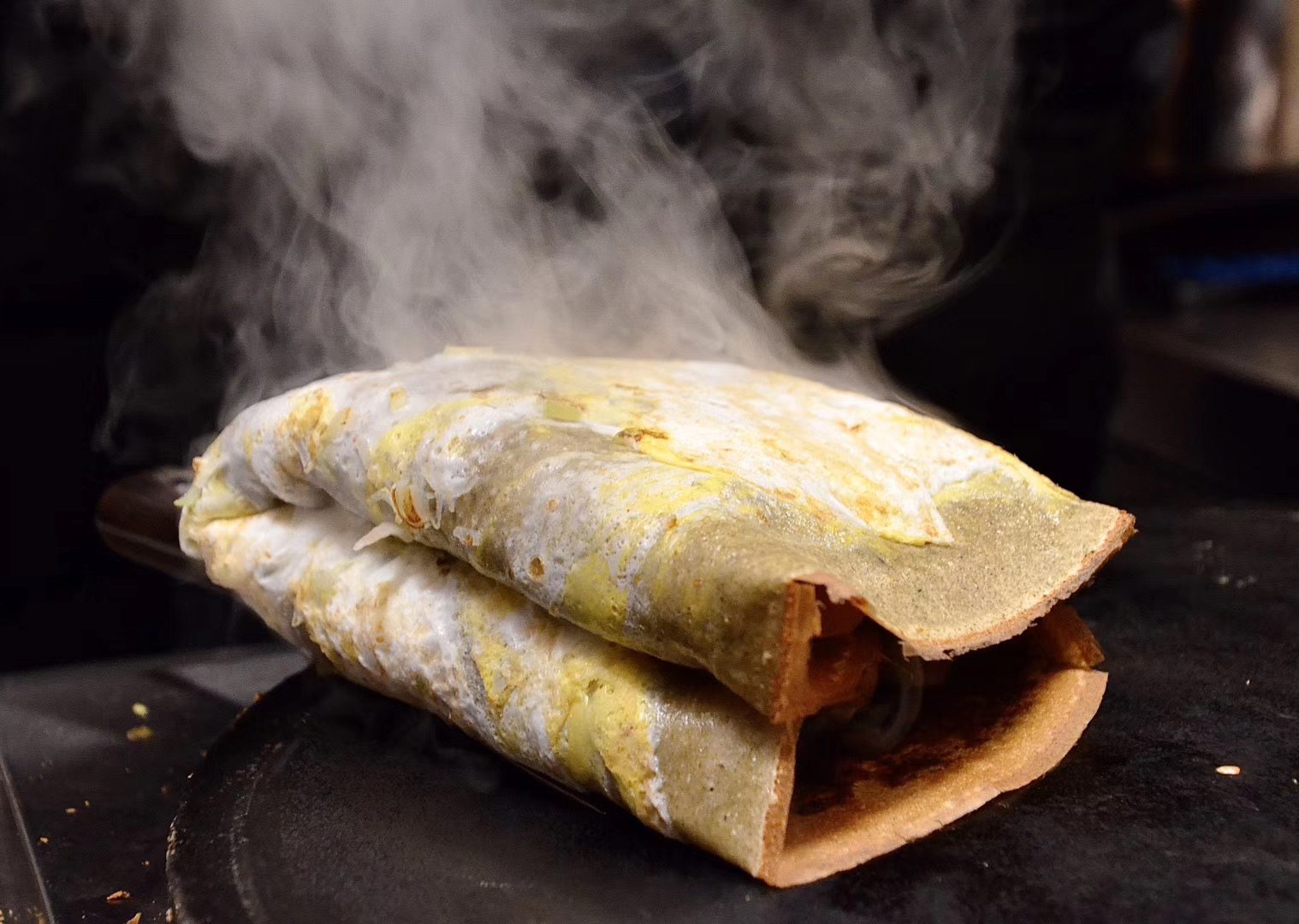
Tianjin Jianbing guozi

Jianbing guozi (Chinese: 煎饼果子; pinyin: Jiānbǐng guǒzi) is a popular Tianjin street food consisting of a thin mung bean flour pancake wrapped around deep-fried dough sticks and flavored with sauces and green onions.In June 2017, the skill of making jianbing guozi was included in the municipal intangible cultural heritage list in Tianjin, and it is said to be "one of China's most beloved street breakfasts", especially in Tianjin and the neighboring province of Hebei.

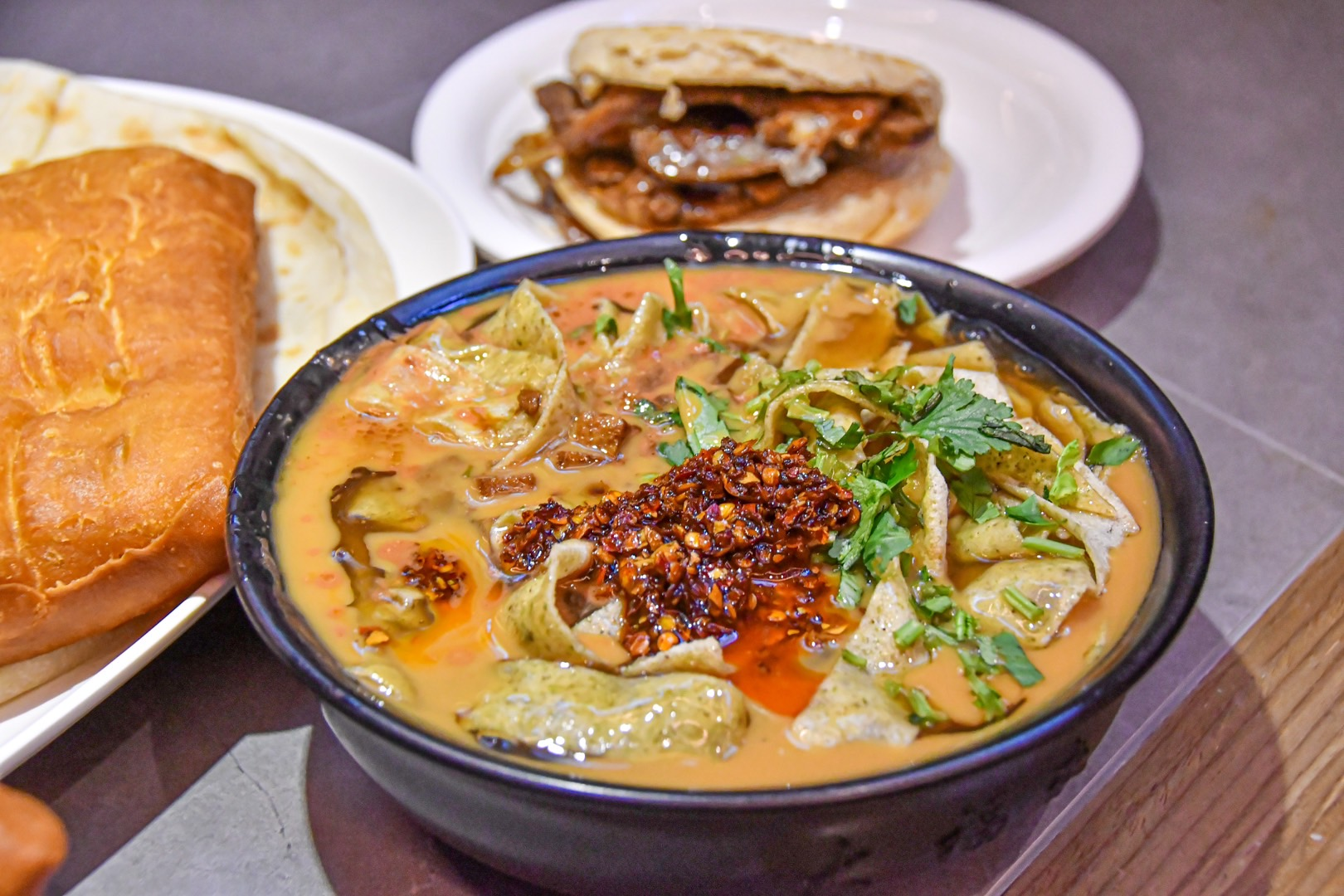
Guobacai

Guobacai, a traditional Tianjin snack, consists of shredded mung bean pancakes served in a flavorful gravy. It is characterized by its savory sauce, which is typically enriched with toppings like sesame paste and a distinctive fermented bean curd sauce.

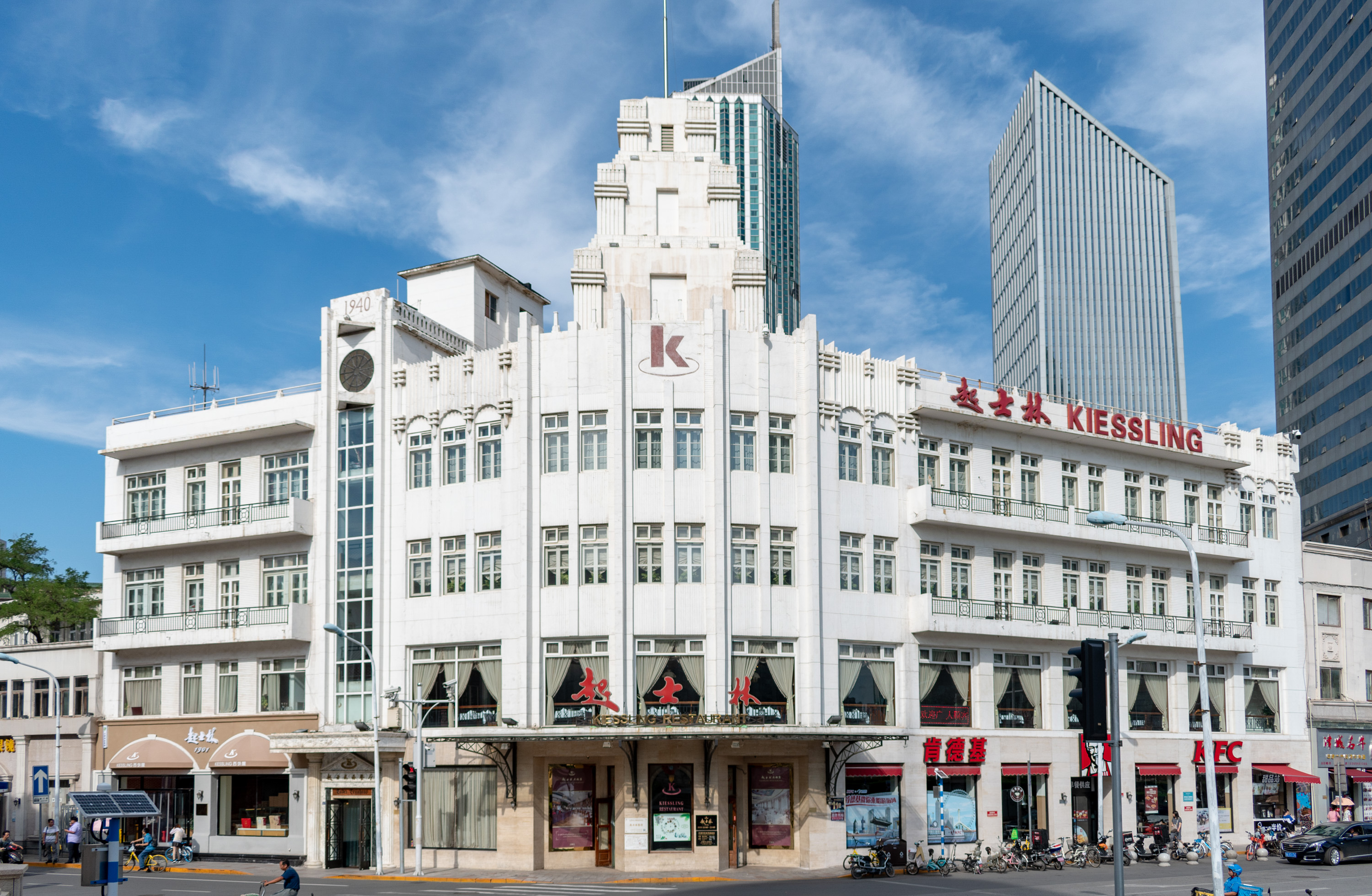
Kiessling Restaurant, a Western-style culinary institution founded in Tianjin in 1907

Tianjin cuisine places a focus on seafood, due to Tianjin's proximity to the sea. It can be further classified into several varieties, including rough (Chinese: 粗; pinyin: cū), smooth (simplified Chinese: 细; traditional Chinese: 細; pinyin: xì), and high (Chinese: 高; pinyin: gāo) cuisine. Menu options include the Eight Great Bowls (Chinese: 八大碗; pinyin: Bādà wǎn), a combination of eight main meat dishes, and the Four Great Stews (Chinese: 四大扒; pinyin: sì dà bā), which actually refers to a large number of stews, which may include chicken, duck, seafood, beef, and mutton.

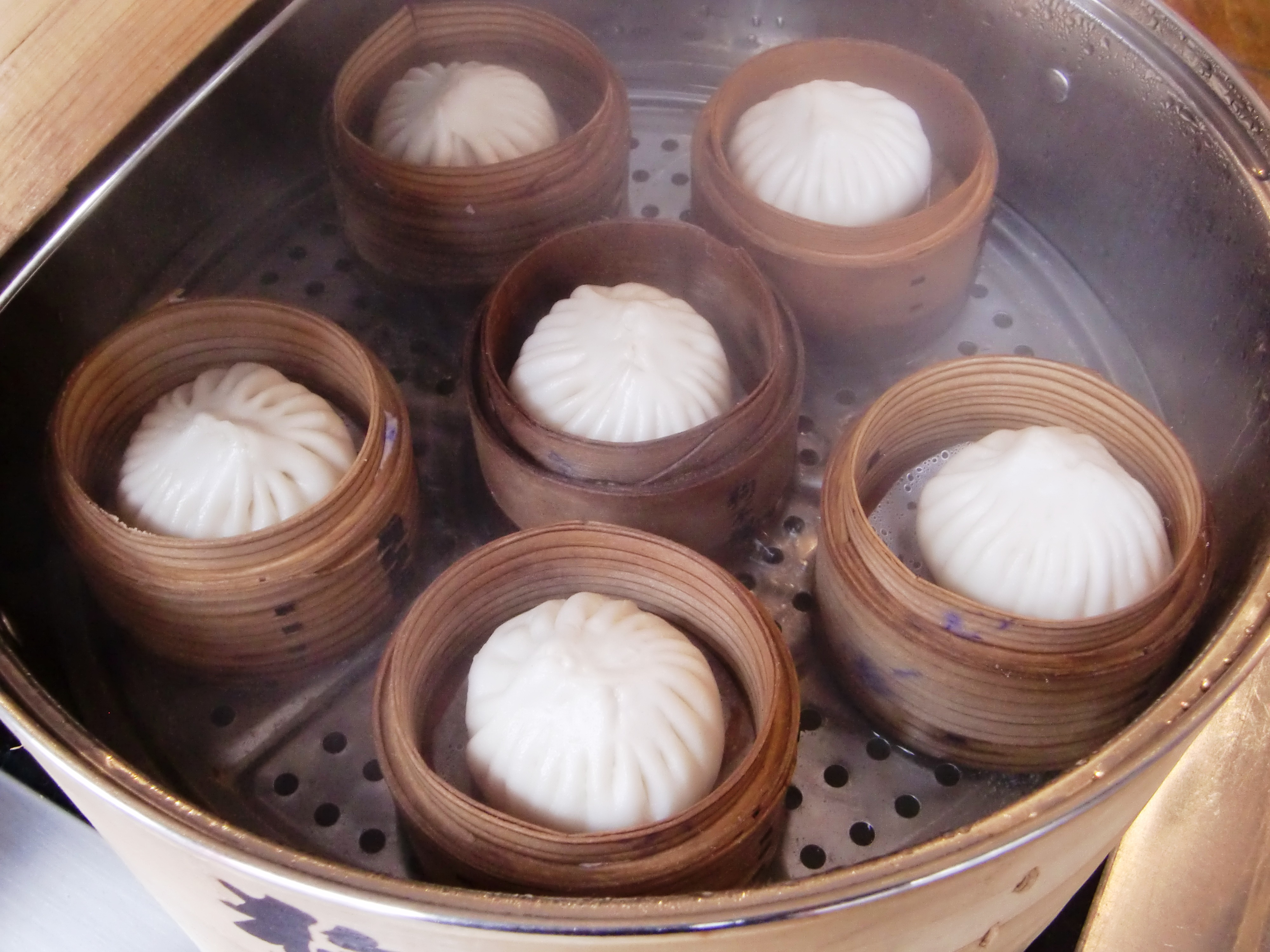
Baozi

The four foods that are considered to be delicacies of Tianjin include Goubuli baozi, Guifaxiang Shibajie Mahua (Chinese: 十八街麻花; pinyin: shíbā jiē máhuā), Erduoyan Zhagao (Chinese: 耳朵眼炸糕; pinyin: erduoyǎn zhà gāo) and Maobuwen Jiaozi (Chinese: 猫不闻饺子; pinyin: māo bù wén jiǎozi). Known foods include Caoji donkey meat, Bazhen sheep-leg mutton of Guanshengyuan, Luji Tangmian Zhagao, Baiji Shuijiao, Gaogan of Zhilanzhai, Guobacai of Dafulai, Subao of Shitoumenkan and Xiaobao chestnut. These snacks are available in Nanshi Food Street, which has food from Tianjin.

== Transport ==
The transportation system in Tianjin is considered to be relatively effective, inclusive and sustainable. The city received the Sustainable Transport Award for 2024 due to its efforts to improve and expand non motorized and public transport, as well as to make it accessible. The policy of the city had an impact on policies at the regional and country level and received support from the World Bank (transportation in Tianjin is its biggest investment in this domain). According to a statement of the Institute for Transportation & Development about policy that resulted in the award, "Thus, the city's recent investments into sustainable mobility policy and infrastructure have the potential to serve as a model for the rest of China, as the nation works towards achieving carbon neutrality before 2060."

=== Airport ===
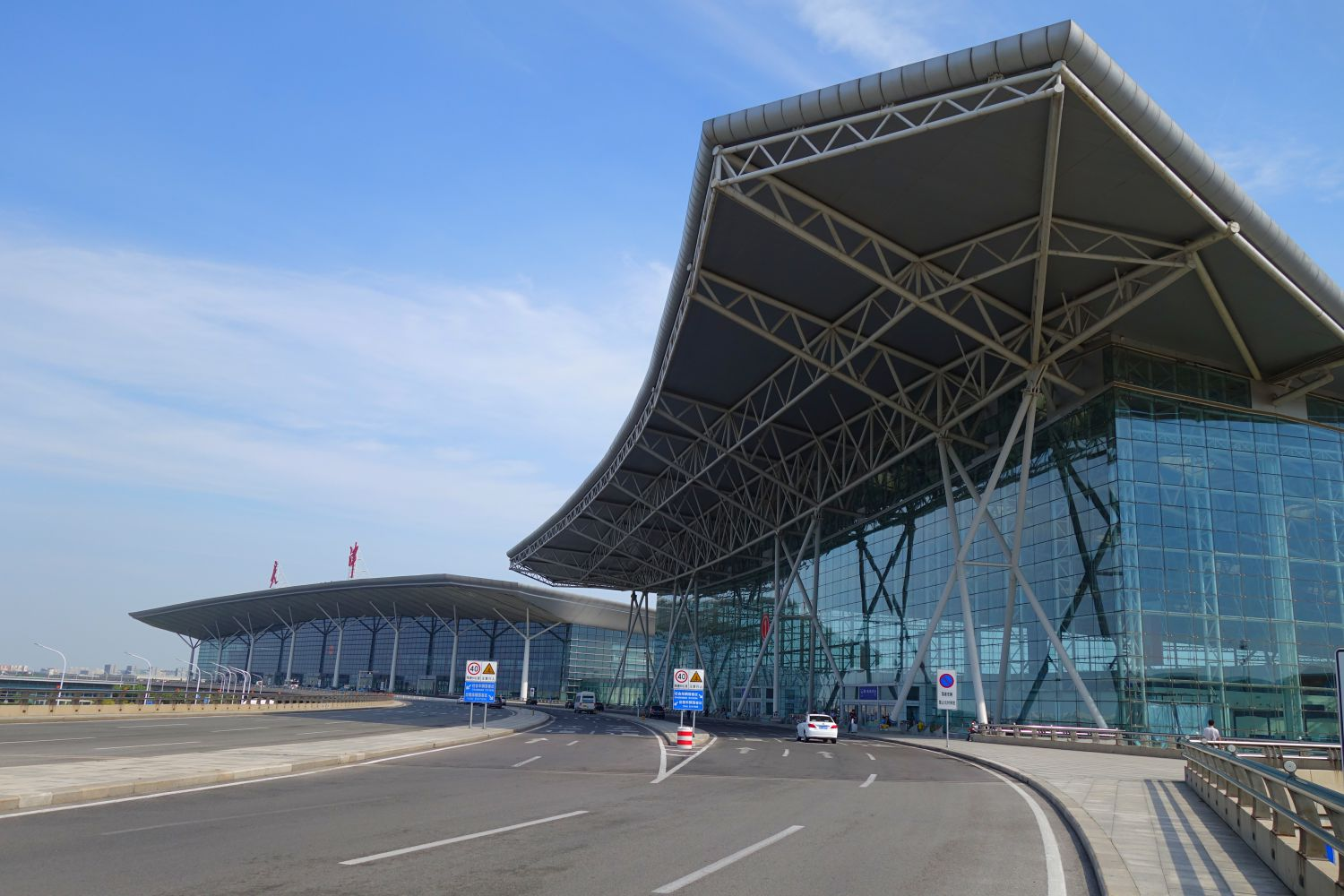
Tianjin Binhai International Airport Terminal 1 and 2

Tianjin Binhai International Airport is located in Dongli District and is roughly 13 km (8 mi) away from the city's downtown area. Tianjin is also served by the new Beijing Daxing International Airport in Beijing.

=== Port of Tianjin ===
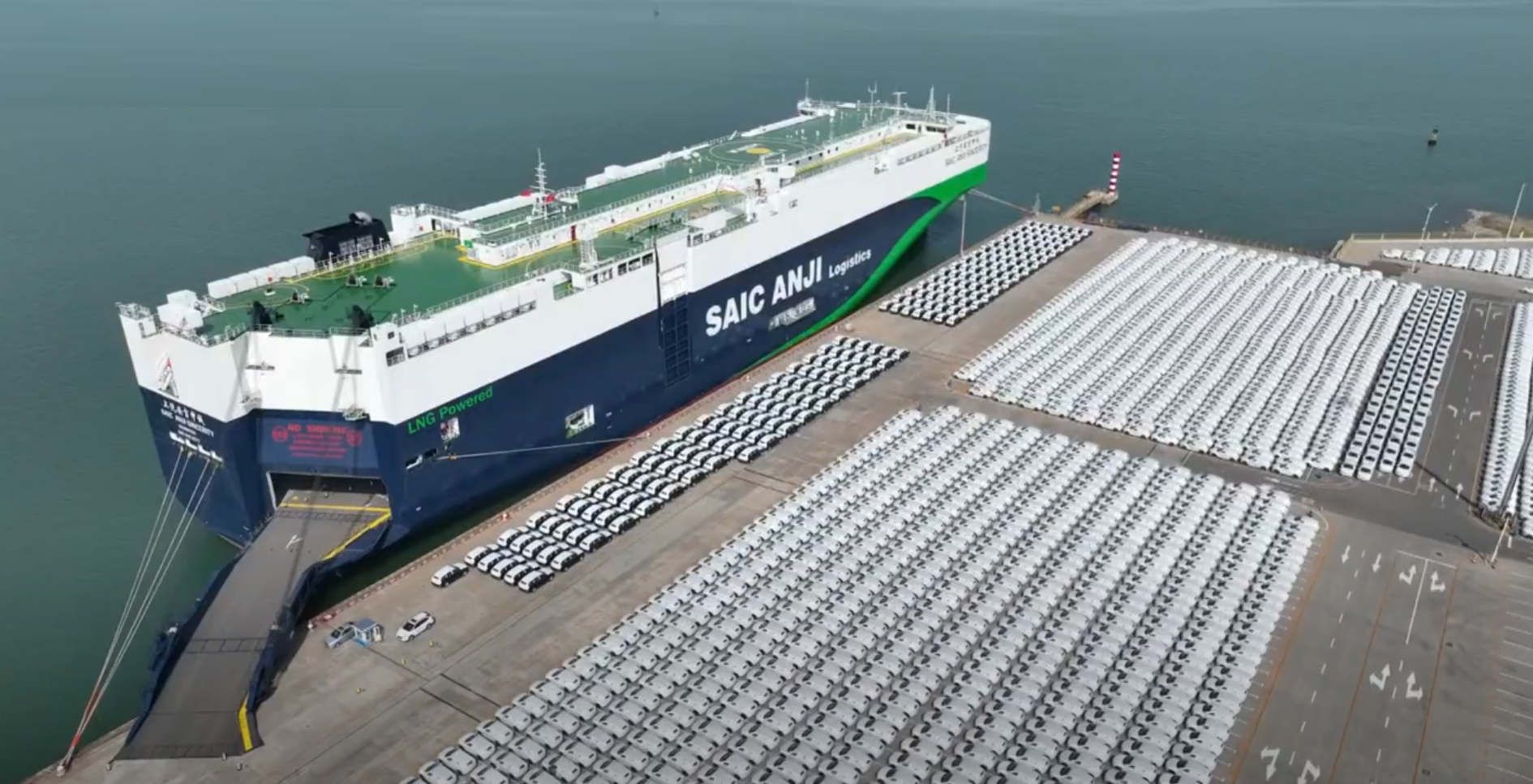
The world's largest clean-energy car carrier in active service makes its first call at The Port of Tianjin.

The Port of Tianjin is China's largest artificial deep water harbor; its throughput capacity is the fifth largest in the world. Located in the Binhai Economic Zone, a national new economic zone of China, Tianjin Harbor is a port for international cruises visiting the wider area, including Beijing.

=== Trams ===
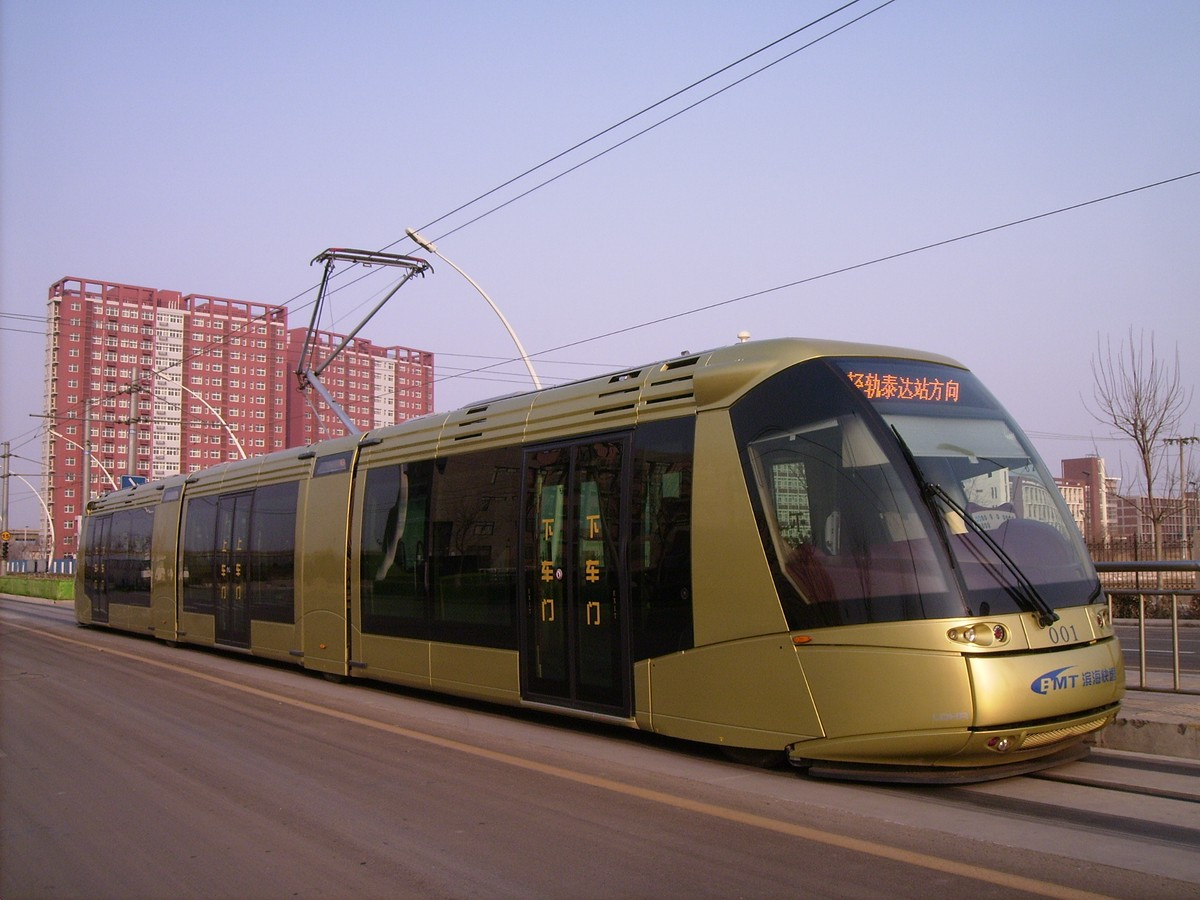
The TEDA Modern Guided Rail Tram is one of the two rubber tire tram systems in Asia.

Tianjin's harbor area of Binhai/TEDA has a modern, high-speed rubber-tired tram system; it is the first of its kind in China and Asia. Constructed in 2006, the system marked a return of the tram to Tianjin, which once had a standard steel-wheeled tramway network. The original Tianjin tram network was constructed by a Belgian company in 1904 and opened in 1906. It was the first citywide tramway system in China. It closed in 1972.

=== Metro ===
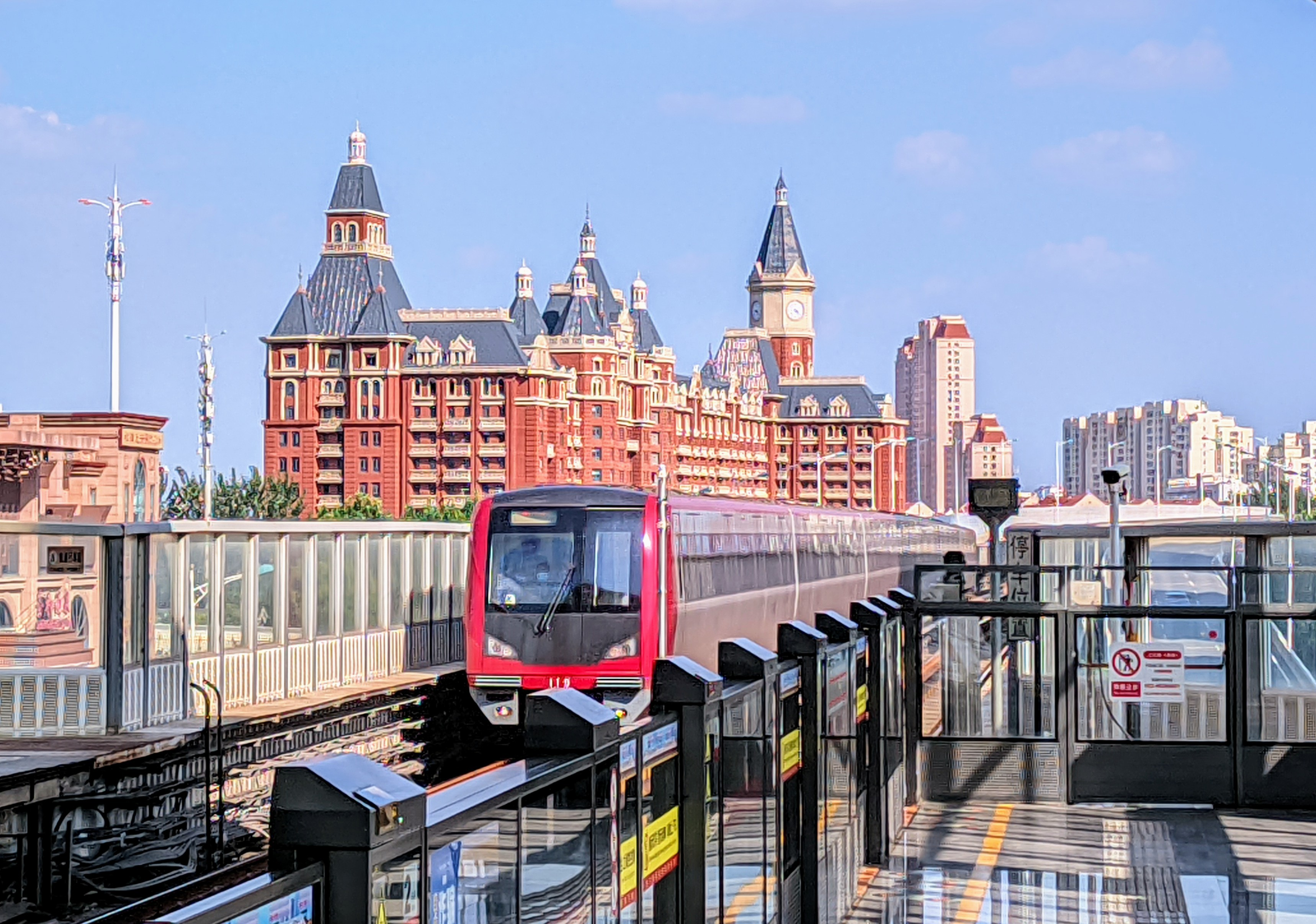
The Tianjin Metro near Chentangzhuang station

The Tianjin Metro was formerly operated by two companies, Tianjin Metro General Corporation and Tianjin Binhai Mass Transit Development Company. However, in 2017, the two companies merged to form the Tianjin Rail Transit Group Corporation. It is currently under expansion to create five to nine lines. A total of six lines are currently operating in the city and the Binhai area. As of April 2019, the entire network of Tianjin Metro has 155 stations and 6 lines.

Construction work on the Tianjin Metro started on July 4, 1970. It was the second metro to be built in China and commenced service in 1984. The total length of track was 7.4 kilometers (5 mi). The metro service was suspended on October 9, 2001, for reconstruction. The original line is now part of Line 1 of the new metro system. It was reopened to the public in June 2006. The track was extended to 26.2 km (16.280 mi); there is now a total of 22 stations. Construction work on Line 2 and Line 3 was completed in 2012; the two lines are now in operation. Several new metro lines have been planned.

The two rapid transit operators in Tianjin are responsible for the service as follows:

- Tianjin Metro General Corporation operates Lines 1, 2, 3 and 6.
- Tianjin Binhai Mass Transit Development Company operates Lines 5 and 9.

=== Rail ===
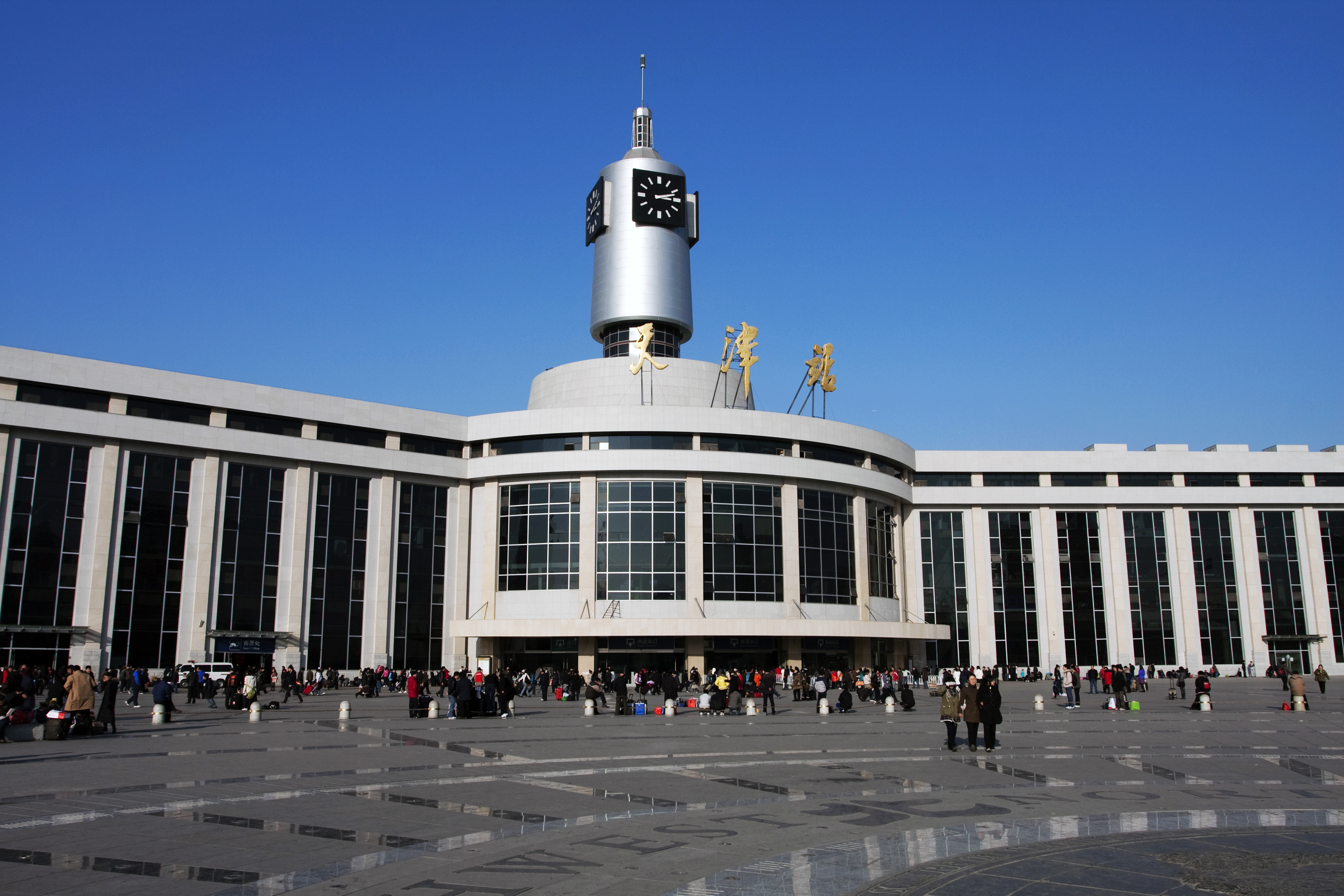
Tianjin railway station

There are several railway stations in the city, Tianjin railway station being one of them. It was built in 1888. The station was initially located at Wangdaozhuang (simplified Chinese: 旺道庄; traditional Chinese: 旺道莊; pinyin: Wàngdàozhuāng). The station was later moved to Laolongtou (simplified Chinese: 老龙头; traditional Chinese: 老龍頭; pinyin: Lǎolóngtóu) on the banks of the Hai He River in 1892; as a result, the station was renamed as Laolongtou Railway Station. The station was completely rebuilt in 1988. The rebuilding work began on April 15, 1987, and was finished on October 1, 1988. The Tianjin Railway Station is also locally known as the 'East Station', due to its geographic position. In January 2007, the station began another long-term restructuring project to modernize the facility as part of the larger Tianjin transport hub project, which involves Tianjin Metro lines 2, 3, and 9, as well as the Tianjin-Beijing High-Speed Rail.

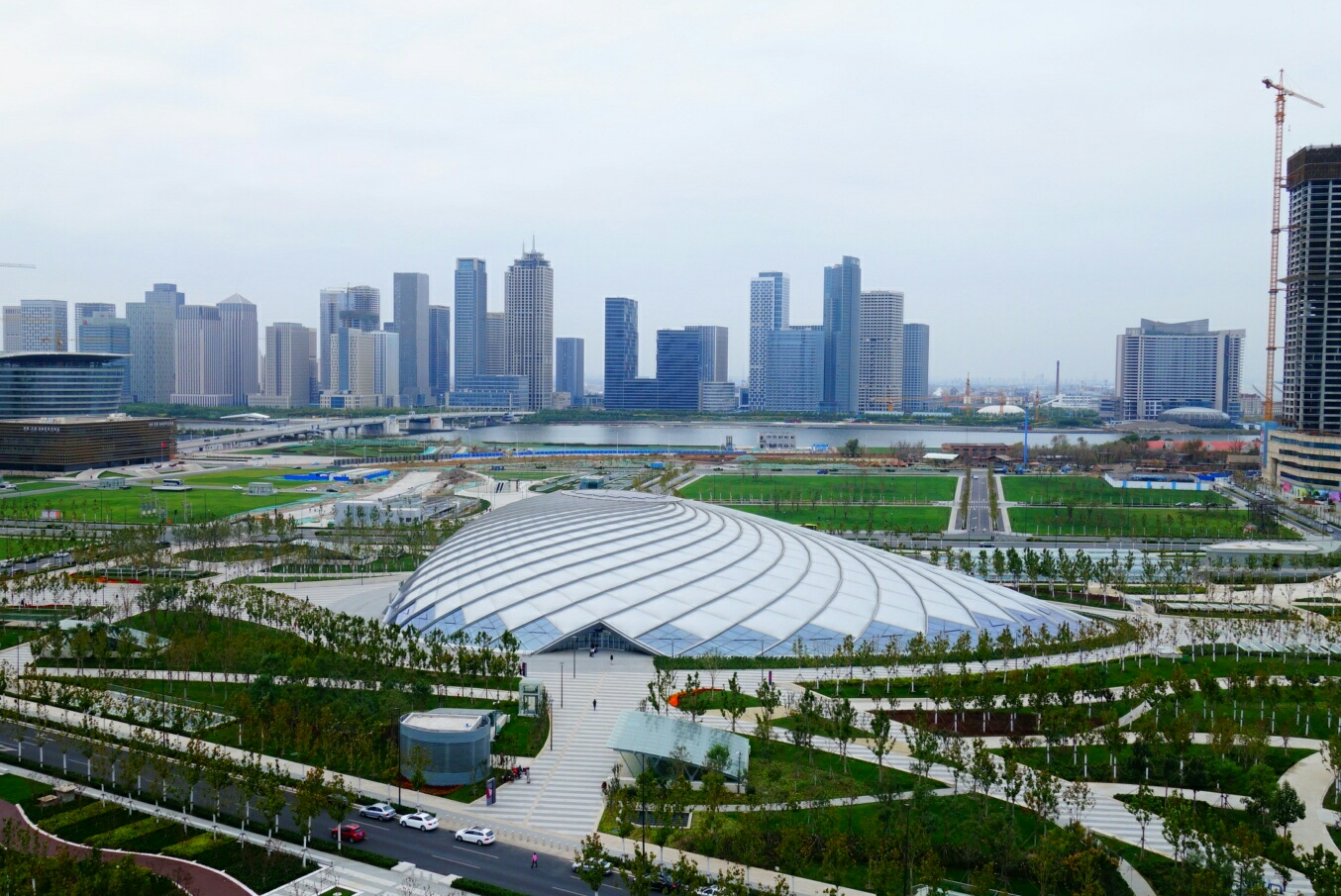
Binhai railway station

Tianjin West railway station and Tianjin North railway station are also in Tianjin. Tanggu railway station is located in the port area of Tanggu District; Binhai railway station and Binhai North railway station are located to the north of Tanggu in TEDA. There are several other railway stations in the city that do not handle passenger traffic. Construction on a Beijing-Tianjin high-speed railway began on July 4, 2005, and was completed during August 2008.

The following rail lines go through Tianjin:

- Jingshan Railway (travels from Beijing to Shanhai Pass)
- Jinpu Railway (travels from Tianjin to Pukou District, Nanjing)
- Jinji Railway (travels from the urban area of Tianjin to Ji County, Tianjin)
- Jinba Railway (travels from Tianjin to Bazhou, Hebei)

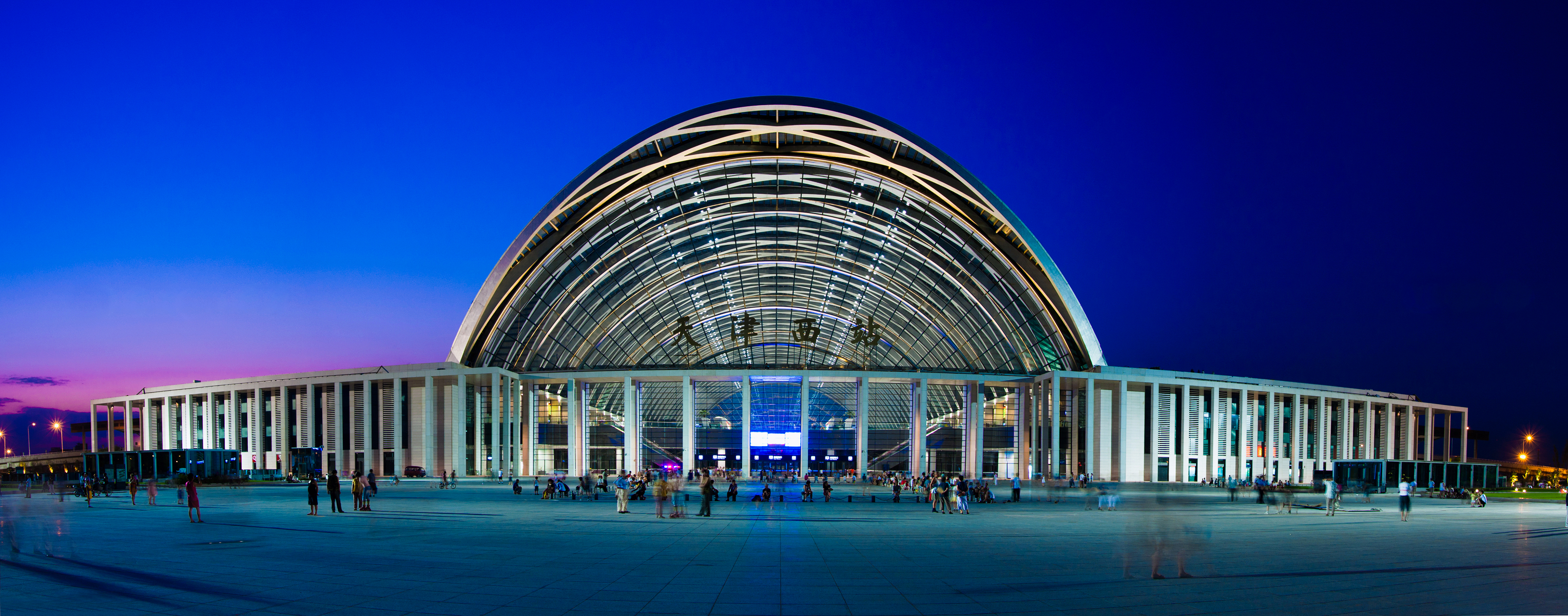
Tianjin West railway station

The inter-city trains between Beijing and Tianjin will adopt a new numbering system using the letter C (C stands for InterCity) followed by four numbers. The train numbers range between C2001 and C2298. The number ranges are divided into three different groups, which provide information about where a train will go:

- C2001–C2198: Directly from Beijing South Station to Tianjin
- C2201–C2268: From Beijing South Station to Tianjin, with stops at Wuqing Station (武清站)
- C2271–C2298: From Beijing South Station to Yujiapu Railway Station in Tianjin

The new C trains take 30 minutes to travel between Beijing and Tianjin; the trains make the journey with half the time used by the previous D trains. The ticket price, as of Aug 15, 2008, is 69 RMB for first-class seating and 58 RMB for second-class seating.

=== Bus ===
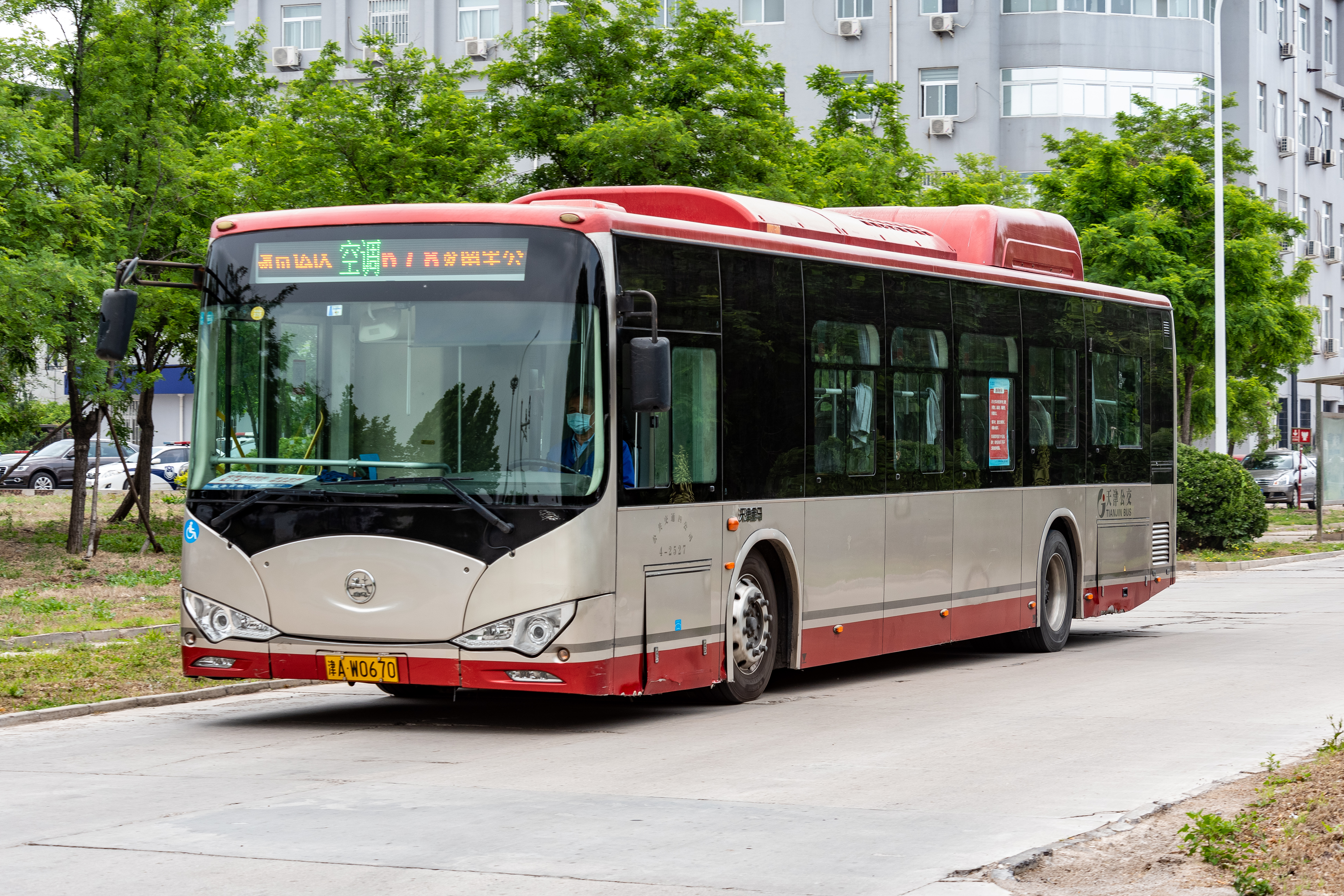
Tianjin Bus Route 678

There were over 900 bus lines in the city as of 2005.

=== Roads and expressways ===
Some roads and bridges, such as Minquan Gate and Beiyang Road, have retained names given to them while the Republic of China (1912–1949) was in power. As in other cities in China, some roads in Tianjin are named after Chinese provinces and cities. Unlike Beijing, Tianjin has few roads that run parallel to the four cardinal directions.

Tianjin has three ring roads. The Inner and Middle Ring Roads are not closed, traffic-controlled roadways and some often have traffic light intersections. The Outer Ring Road is similar to a highway-level ring road. The road experiences traffic.

- Inner Ring Road (neihuan)
- Middle Ring Road (zhonghuan)
- Outer Ring Road (waihuan)

Tianjin's roads often finish in dao (Chinese: 道; lit. 'avenue') and xian (simplified Chinese: 线; traditional Chinese: 線; lit. 'line'). These suffixes are most often used for highways and through routes. The terms lu (Chinese: 路; lit. 'road') and jie (Chinese: 街; lit. 'street') are not generally used. As Tianjin's roads are tend to not be in cardinal directions, jing (simplified Chinese: 经; traditional Chinese: 經; lit. 'avenue') roads and wei (simplified Chinese: 纬; traditional Chinese: 緯; lit. 'avenue') roads appear; these roads attempt to run more directly north–south and east–west, respectively.

The following seven expressways of China run in or through Tianjin:

- Jingjintang Expressway (travels from Beijing, through Tianjin's urban area, to Tanggu District / TEDA)
- Jinghu Expressway (travels from Jinjing Gonglu Bridge to Shanghai; similarly to Jingjintang Expressway, this expressway travels from Beijing to Shanghai)
- Jingshen Expressway (travels through Baodi District on its way from Beijing to Shenyang)
- Tangjin Expressway (travels from Tanggu District, Tianjin, to Tangshan, Hebei—known as the Jintang Expressway in Tianjin)
- Baojin Expressway (travels from Beichen District, Tianjin, to Baoding, Hebei—known as the Jinbao Expressway in Tianjin)
- Jinbin Expressway (travels from Zhangguizhuang Bridge to Hujiayuan Bridge; both bridges are in Tianjin)
- Jinji Expressway (travels from central Tianjin to Jixian County)

The following six China National Highways pass through Tianjin:

- China National Highway 102 (travels through Ji County, Tianjin on its way from Beijing to Harbin
- China National Highway 103 (travels from Beijing, through Tianjin's urban area, to Tanggu District)
- China National Highway 104 (travels from Beijing, through Tianjin Municipality, to Fuzhou)
- China National Highway 105 (travels from Beijing, through Tianjin Municipality, to Macau)
- China National Highway 112 (a circular highway around Beijing; passes through Tianjin Municipality)
- China National Highway 205 (travels from Shanhaiguan, Hebei, through Tianjin Municipality, to Guangzhou)

== Religion ==
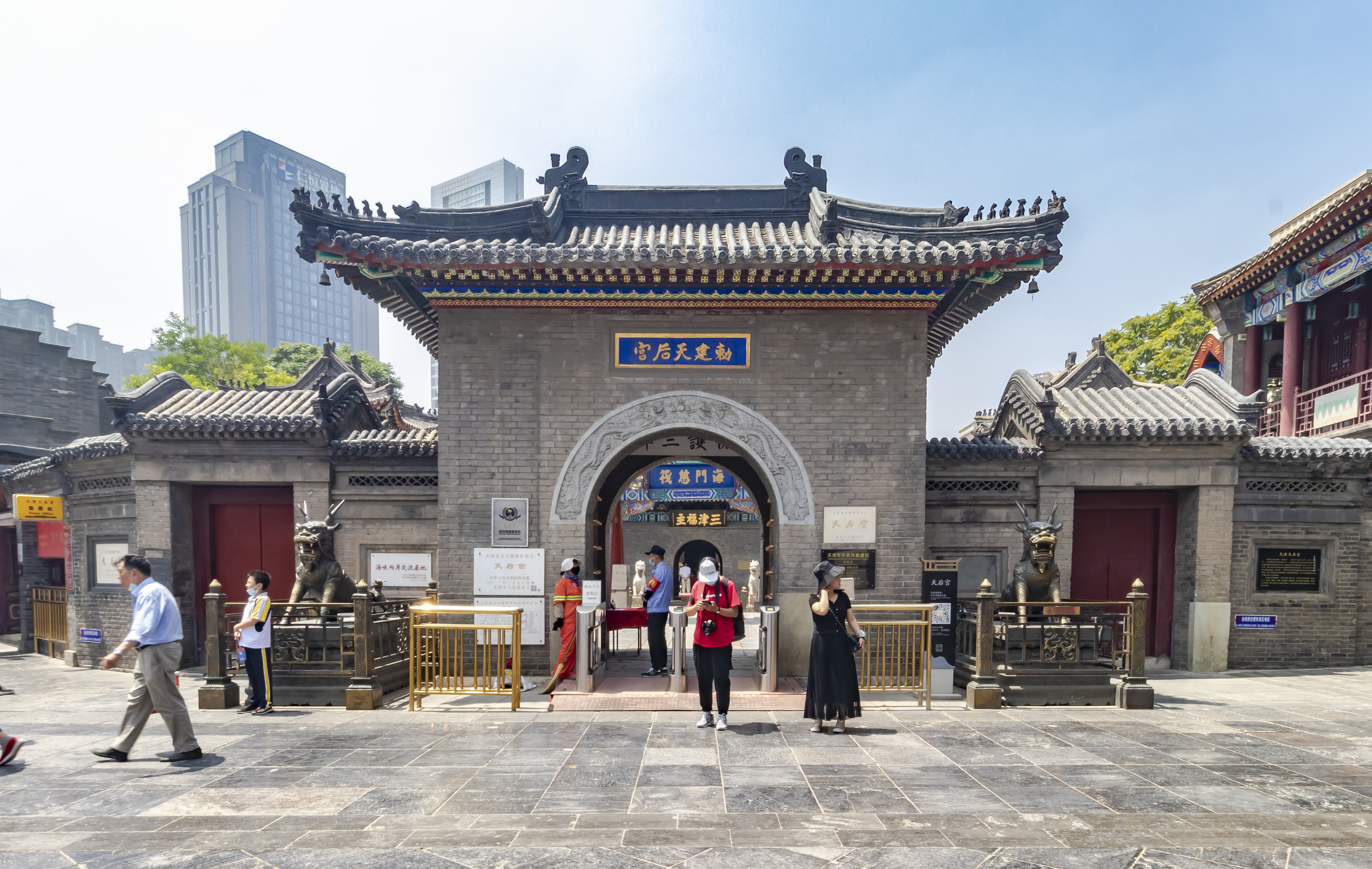
A Mazu temple in Tianjin

Some residents of Tianjin participate in indigenous religious practices, such as the worship of Mazu, a sea goddess. Tianjin also contains the Temple of Great Compassion (a Buddhist temple), St. Joseph's Cathedral (a Catholic cathedral also known as Laoxikai Church), and Our Lady of Victory Church (a Catholic church also known as Wanghailou Church). A Roman Catholic Diocese of Tianjin exists. According to the Chinese General Social Survey of 2009, Christians constitute 1.51% of the city's population. Tianjin has been described as a historically "strong center" of Islam in China. Northwestern Tianjin has traditionally been the location of the Muslim quarter of the city, where Muslims have lived for centuries; the area is near the city's Great Mosque, Qingzhen si, which was founded in 1703. The city also contains the Dahuoxiang Mosque.

== Sports ==
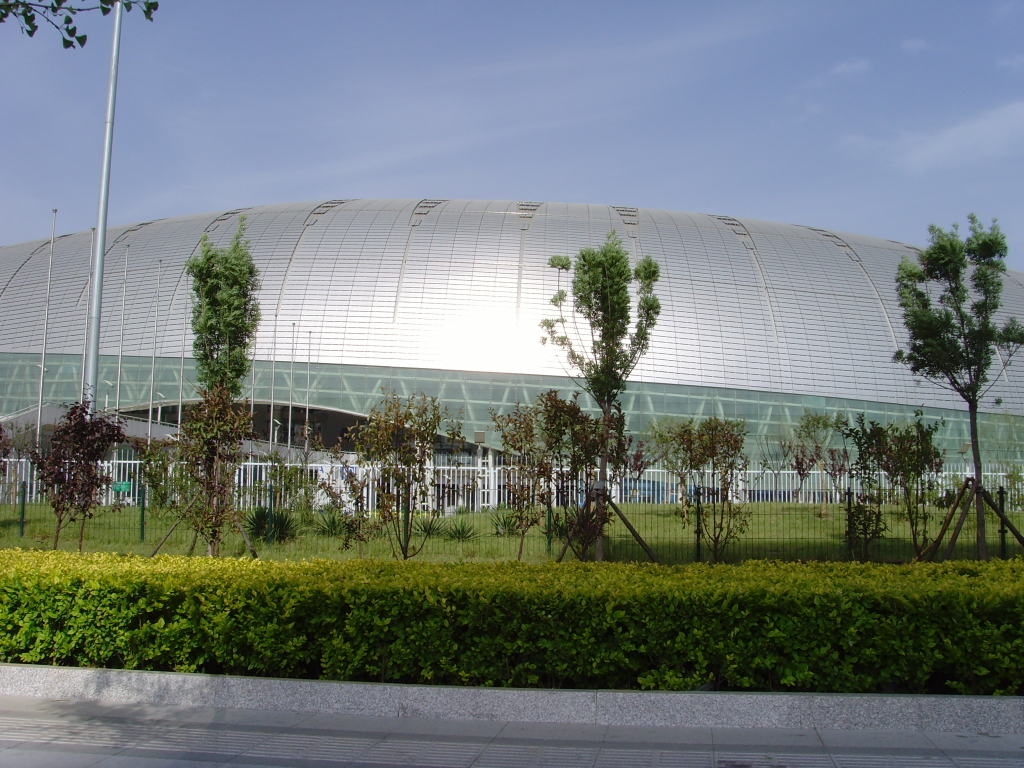
Tianjin Olympic Center Stadium

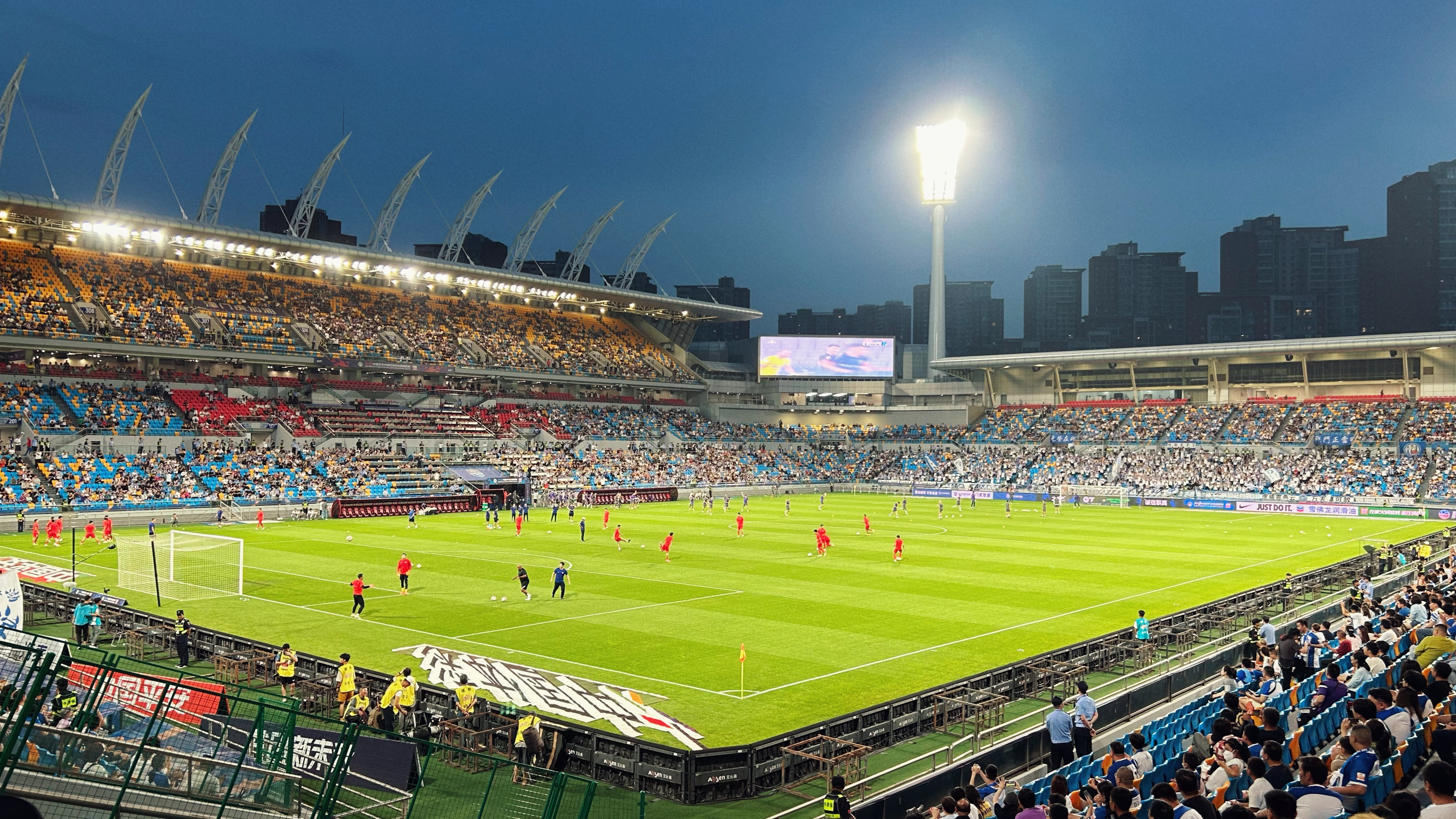
TEDA Football Stadium

Sports teams based in Tianjin include the following:

- Tianjin Jinmen Tiger FC (in the Chinese Super League of professional football)
- Tianjin Lions (in the China Baseball League)
- Tianjin Pioneers (in the Chinese Basketball Association)
- Tianjin Bohai Bank women's volleyball team (in the Chinese Volleyball League)

The 1995 World Table Tennis Championships, the 2013 East Asian Games, and the 2017 National Games of China were hosted by the city. Tianjin was scheduled to be one of the host cities for the expanded FIFA Club World Cup in 2021 before its cancellation due to the COVID-19 pandemic. It was also scheduled to be one of the host cities for the 2023 AFC Asian Cup before China's withdrawal as the host.

Since 2014, a WTA international tennis tournament has taken place in Tianjin every year at the Tuanbo International Tennis Center.

== Martial arts ==
For some centuries, Tianjin and Beijing had been considered centers for traditional Chinese martial arts. Formerly and currently practiced martial arts including bajiquan, piguazhang, xingyiquan, and baguazhang have been practiced in the city. The martial arts that the city is known most for are Hong Qiao and Nankai. Martial artists practice in public green spaces such as Xigu Park and the Tianjin Water Park.

== Education ==
Tianjin is ranked as the 15th leading city in the world with the highest scientific research outputs and second in the North China region after Beijing.

=== Colleges and universities ===
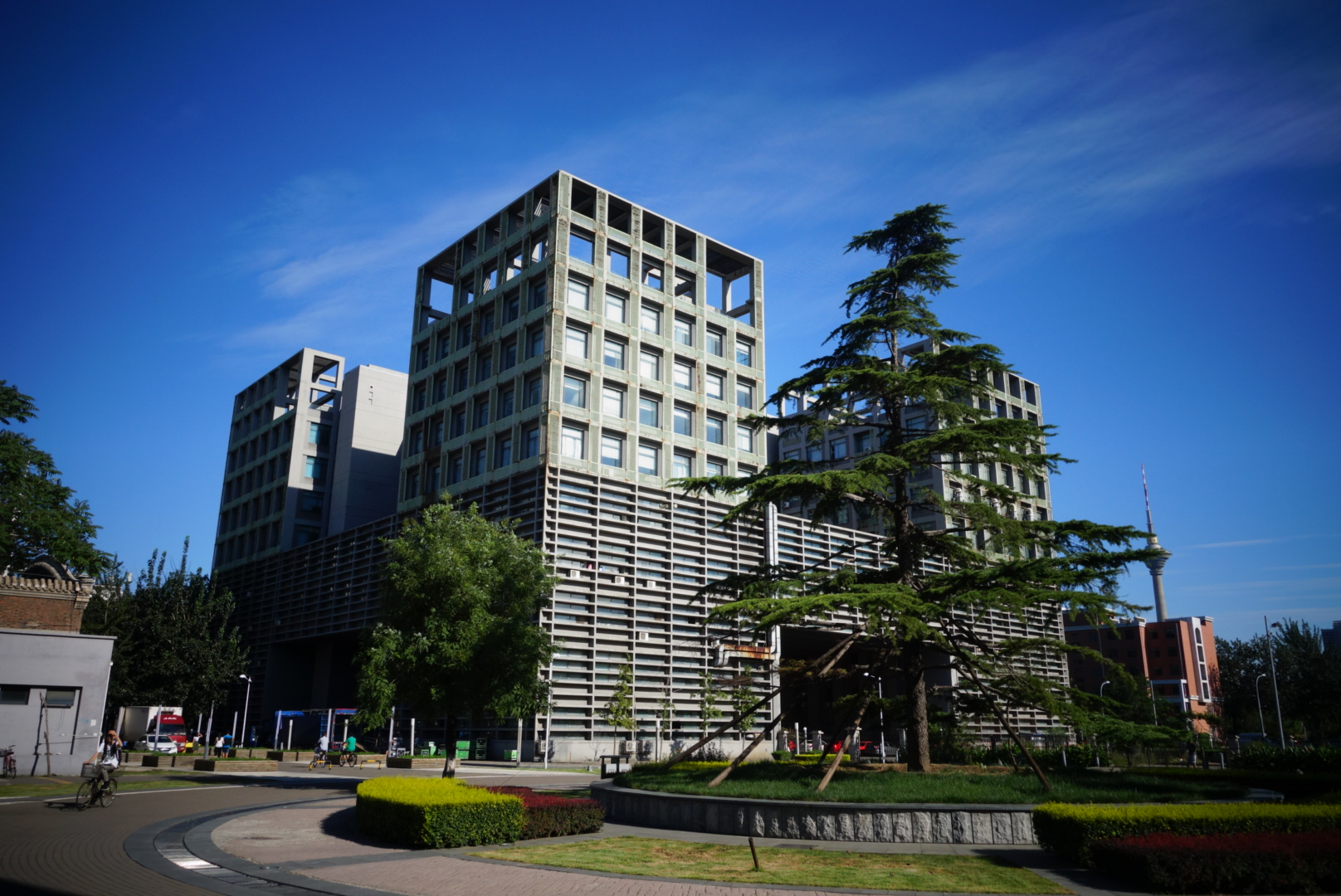
Tianjin University and Nankai University Joint Research Building

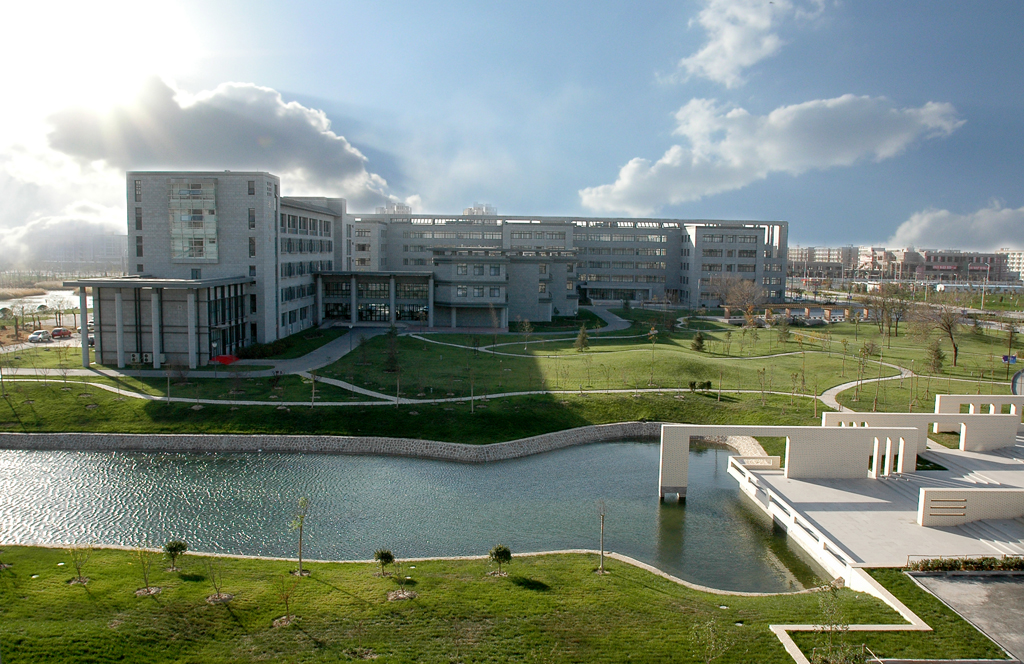
Tianjin Normal University

The following universities are under the jurisdiction of the national Ministry of Education:

- Tianjin University (founded in 1895; the first modern university in China)
- Nankai University (founded in 1919)

The following are under the jurisdiction of the municipal government:

- Tianjin Academy of Fine Arts
- Tianjin Agricultural College
- Tianjin Chengjian University
- Tianjin Conservatory of Music
- Tianjin Foreign Studies University
- Tianjin Institute of Physical Education
- Tianjin Medical University
- Tianjin Normal University
- Tianjin Polytechnic University
- Tianjin University of Commerce
- Tianjin University of Finance & Economics
- Tianjin University of Science & Technology
- Tianjin University of Technology
- Tianjin University of Technology and Education
- Tianjin University of Traditional Chinese Medicine

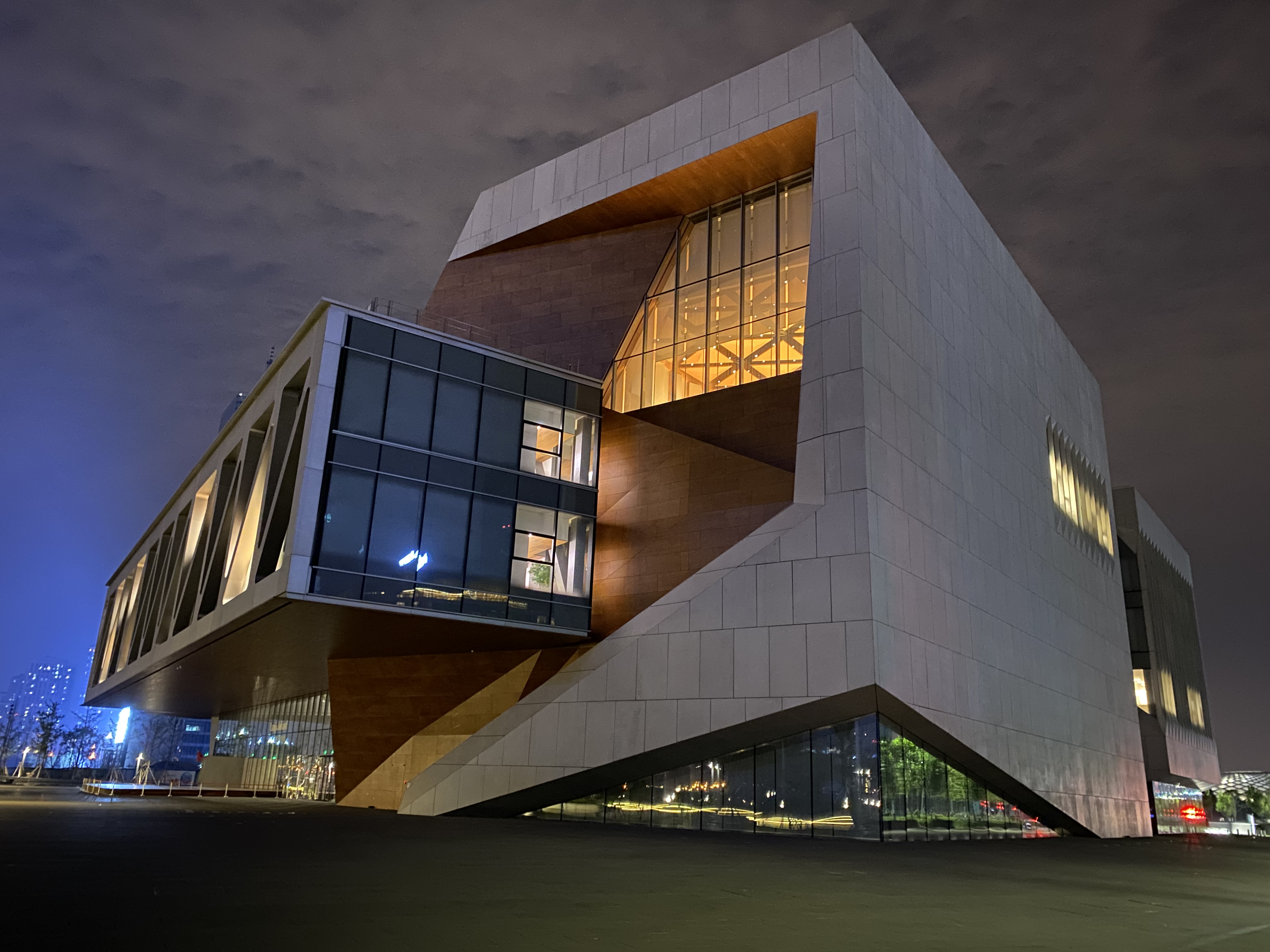
Tianjin Juilliard School in Binhai, Tianjin

The following are under the jurisdiction of the national Civil Aviation Authority of China:

- Civil Aviation University of China

The following are under the Hebei Provincial People's Government:

- Hebei University of Technology (founded 1903, the earliest institute of technology in China)

The following are foreign institutions:

- The Florida International University Tianjin Center (opened in 2006 as a cooperative venture between the municipal government and the Miami-based university)
- The Great Wall MBA Program of the Oklahoma City University's Meinders School of Business (established in 1986 on the campus of the Tianjin University of Finance & Economics)
- Raffles Design Institute Tianjin is a joint-project between the Tianjin University of Commerce, Boustead College and the Raffles Design Institute in Singapore.
- The Tianjin Juilliard School is a branch of the Juilliard School located in Binhai, Tianjin, China.

The following is a private institution:

- Boustead College

Institutions without full-time bachelor programs are not listed above.

=== High schools ===
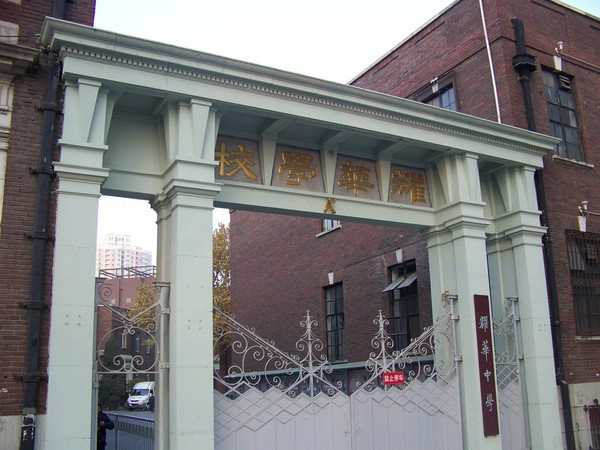
Yaohua High School

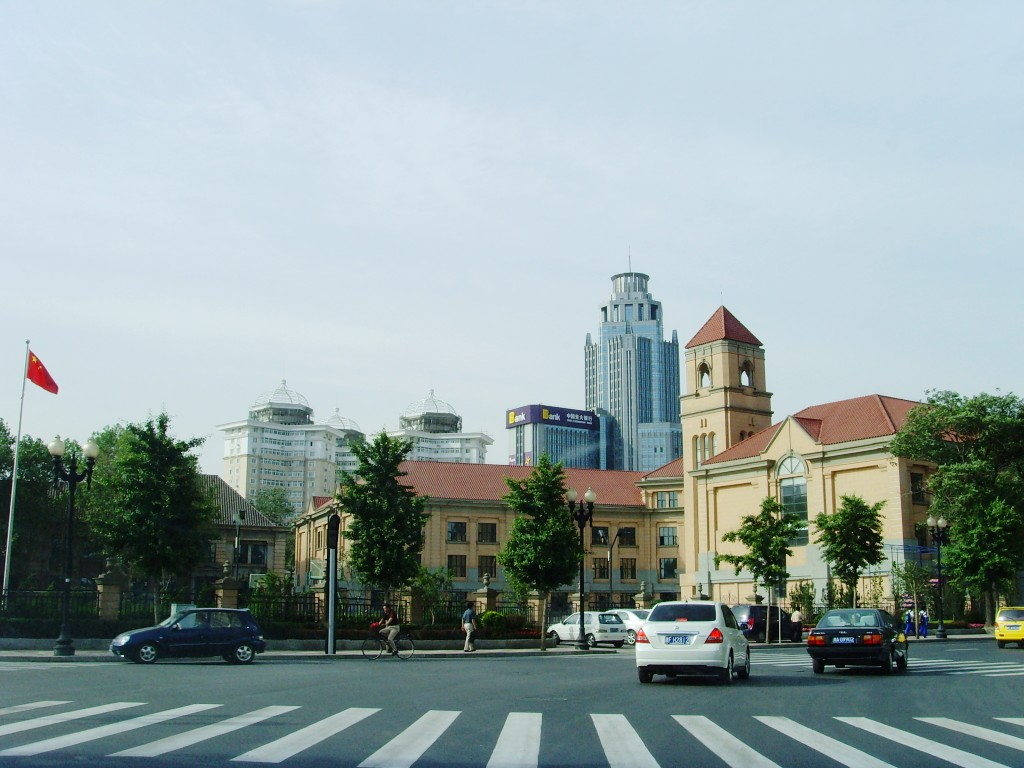
Tianjin No.20 High School

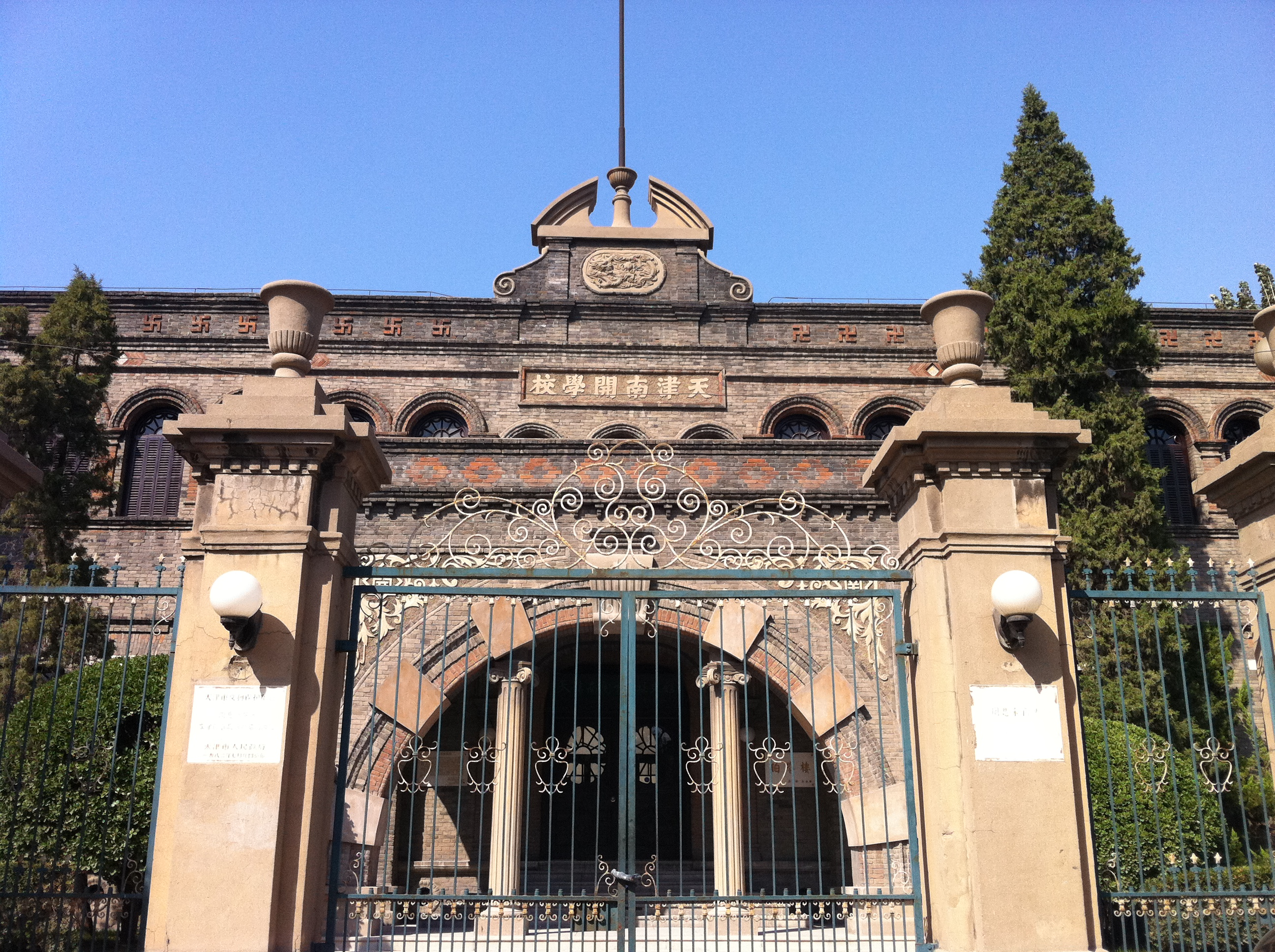
Tianjin Nankai High School

- Tianjin Nankai High School (天津市南开中学)
- Tianjin No. 1 High School (天津市第一中学)
- Tianjin Yaohua Middle School (天津市耀华中学) was founded in 1927. It was previously known as Tianjin Gongxue by Lefeng Zhuang; it was renamed as Tianjin Yaohua Middle School in 1934.
- Tianjin Xinhua High School (天津市新华中学)
- Tianjin Experimental High School (天津市实验中学)
- Tianjin No. 21 High School (天津第二十一中學) (formerly Fahan College—法漢學堂; 'College'), was founded in 1895. The French ambassador to China and consul general in Tianjin called it the French academy. It was renamed "工部局學校" in 1902, before moving to its current address in 1916, when it was renamed Fahan College (法漢學堂); in French, it is still known as "Ecole Municipale Francaise". The school is located in an area with political and cultural education in Heping district and is adjacent to the largest Catholic church in northern China; thus, the main building of the school has retained its church-like appearance. The school covers an area of 10.1 mu (6.7 km^{2}); the building's floor has an area of 10,300 square meters.
- Tianjin Tianjin High School (天津市天津中学)
- Tianjin Fuxing High School (天津市复兴中学)
- Tianjin Ruijing High School (天津市瑞景中学)
- The Foreign Languages School Affiliated with the Tianjin Foreign Studies University (TFLS; 天津外国语学院附属外国语学校)
- Tianjin No. 20 High School (天津市第二十中学)
- Tianjin No. 4 High School (天津市第四中学)
- Tianjin Yangcun No. 1 High School (天津市杨村第一中学)
- Tianjin Ji No. 1 High School (天津市蓟县第一中学)
- Tianjin Dagang No. 1 High School (天津市大港第一中学)
- Tianjin Second Nankai High School (天津市第二南开中学)
- Tianjin Tanggu No. 1 High School (天津市塘沽第一中学)
- Tianjin No. 42 High School (天津市第四十二中学)
- Tianjin Baodi No. 1 High School (天津市宝坻第一中学)
- Tianjin Dagang Oilfield Experimental High School (天津市大港油田实验中学)
- Tianjin No. 47 High School (天津市第四十七中学)
- Tianjin No. 7 High School (天津市第七中学)
- Tianjin Jinghai No. 1 High School (天津市静海第一中学)
- Tianjin Haihe High School (天津市海河中学)
- Tianjin Economic-Technological Development Area No. 1 High School (天津经济技术开发区第一中学)
- Tianjin No. 55 High School (天津市第五十五中学)
- Tianjin High School Affiliated with Beijing Normal University (北京师范大学天津附属中学)
- Tianjin No. 21 High School (天津市第二十一中学)
- Tianjin Xianshuigu No. 1 High School (天津市咸水沽第一中学)
- The High School Affiliated with Nankai University (南开大学附属中学)
- Tianjin No. 41 High School (天津市第四十一中学)
- Tianjin Lutai No. 1 High School (天津市芦台第一中学)
- Tianjin No. 2 High School (天津市第二中学)
- Tianjin No. 3 High School (天津市第三中学)
- Tianjin Huiwen High School (天津市汇文中学)
- Tianjin Chonghua High School (天津市崇化中学)
- Tianjin No. 100 High School (天津市第一〇〇中学)
- Tianjin Hangu No. 1 High School (天津市汉沽第一中学)
- Tianjin Ziyun High School (天津市紫云中学)
- Tianjin No. 102 High School (天津市第一〇二中学)
- Tianjin No. 45 High School (天津市第四十五中学)
- Tianjin No. 25 High School (天津市第二十五中学)
- The High School Affiliated with Tianjin University (天津大学附属中学)
- Tianjin No. 5 High School (天津市第五中学)
- Tianjin Yangliuqing No. 1 High School (天津市杨柳青第一中学)
- Tianjin No. 14 High School (天津市第十四中学)
- Tianjin National High School (天津市民族中学)
- Tianjin No. 54 High School (天津市第五十四中学)
- Tianjin No. 43 High School (天津市第四十三中学)
- Tianjin Ironworks No. 2 High School (天津铁厂第二中学)
- Tianjin No. 9 High School (天津市第九中学)
- Tianjin No. 57 High School (天津市第五十七中学)
- Tianjin No. 51 High School (天津市第五十一中学)
- Tianjin Fulun High School (天津市扶轮中学)
- Tianjin Bohai Petroleum No. 1 High School (天津市渤海石油第一中学)

=== Middle schools ===
- Tianjin No. 7 Middle School

== Notable people from Tianjin ==
- Hou Baolin (1917–1993; xiangsheng performer)
- Xia Baolong (1952–; Chinese politician and member of the National People's Congress Environment Protection and Resources Conservation Committee)
- Zhang Boli (1948–; traditional Chinese medicine practitioner)
- Qin Gang (1966–; former Chinese Ambassador to the United States and current Chinese foreign minister)
- Yu Genwei (1974–; professional football midfielder; manager)
- Wang Hao (1992–; diver who is a world champion)
- Liu Huan (1963–; modern singer and songwriter; professor of western music at the Beijing University of International Business and Economics)
- Li Ruihuan (1934–; Chairman of the Chinese People's Political Consultative Conference from 1993 to 2003)
- Wen Jiabao (1942–; premier of China from 2003 to 2013)
- Hao Jingfang (1987–; science-fiction writer)
- Harry Kingman (1892–1982; the only major league baseball player born in China)
- Robert Ya Fu Lee (1913–1986; actor)
- Ching Chun Li (1912–2003); human geneticist
- Eric Liddell (1902–1945; Olympic gold medalist)
- Gao Lingwei (1870–1940; former premier of the Republic of China 1923–1924)
- Gao Lingwen (1862–1945; founder of Tianjin's first public school)
- Adeline Yen Mah (1937–; Chinese-born American author of Falling Leaves and Chinese Cinderella: The Secret Story of an Unwanted Daughter)
- Zhang Meng (1988–; actress)
- Yu Min (1926–2019; nuclear physicist who is referred to as "the father of Chinese Hydrogen Bomb")
- Zhang Pengxiang (1980–; chess grandmaster)
- Liu Ping (1984–; Paralympic gold medalist sprinter)
- Chang Po-ling (1876–1951; founder of Nankai University)
- Wang Qiang (1992–; Chinese professional female tennis player)
- Zhou Ruchang (1918–2012; Chinese Redologist and calligrapher)
- Shao Fang Sheng (1917–2009; Chinese artist)
- Peng Shuai (1986–; Chinese professional female tennis player)
- Zhang Shuai (1989–; Chinese professional female tennis player)
- Lubert Stryer (1938–2024; American professor of biochemistry)
- Lam Suet (1964–; actor from Hong Kong)
- Hu Xianxu (2000–; Chinese actor)
- Fung Wang-yuen (Wu Ma) (1942–2014; actor, director, producer, and writer for movies)
- Tan Xue (1984–; Olympic and world champion fencer)
- Zhao Yanming (1981–; professional football goalkeeper)
- Sun Yaoting (1902–1992; last surviving imperial eunuch from China)
- Shang Yi (1979–; professional football midfielder and sports commentator)
- Yang Yi (1919–2023; translated Wuthering Heights into Chinese)
- Chen Yibing (1984–; world champion and Olympic gold medal-winning gymnast)
- Xu Yifan (1988–; professional tennis player)
- Yu Ying-shih (1930–2021; historian and Sinologist)
- Duan Yingying (1989–; Chinese professional female tennis player)
- Cui Yongyuan (1963–; television personality)
- Ed Tse-chun Young (1931–2023; award-winning Chinese-American children's book writer and illustrator)
- Huo Yuanjia (1868–1910; Chinese martial artist and co-founder of the Chin Woo Athletic Association)
- Zhang Yuxuan (1994–; professional female tennis player)
- An Zhongxin (1971–; Olympic silver medalist for softball)
- Juliana Young Koo (1905–2017; Chinese-American diplomat worked in the UN Protocol Department, widow of Wellington Koo)
- Niohuru X (drag performer, fashion designer, and make-up artist)

== Twin towns and sister cities ==
- Kobe, Hyōgo Prefecture, Japan
- Chiba, Chiba Prefecture, Japan
- Incheon, South Korea
- Mobile, Alabama, United States
- Fitchburg, Massachusetts, United States
- Philadelphia, Pennsylvania, United States
- Melbourne, Victoria, Australia
- Bangkok, Thailand
- Phnom Penh, Cambodia
- Pyongyang, North Korea
- Sarajevo, Bosnia and Herzegovina
- Abidjan, Côte d'Ivoire
- Groningen, the Netherlands (since 1985)
- Rishon LeZion, Israel
- İzmir, Turkey
- Haiphong, Vietnam (since 1997)
- Singapore
- Mar del Plata, Argentina (since 2001)
- Larnaca, Republic of Cyprus (since 2007)
- Jönköping, Sweden (since 1993)
- Thessaloniki, Greece (since 2002)
- Cali, Colombia (since 2022)

== See also ==
- Tianjin is also the name of an asterism in the Chinese constellation of Girl mansion.
- New first-tier city
