= Guoba cuisine =

Chinese breakfast dish

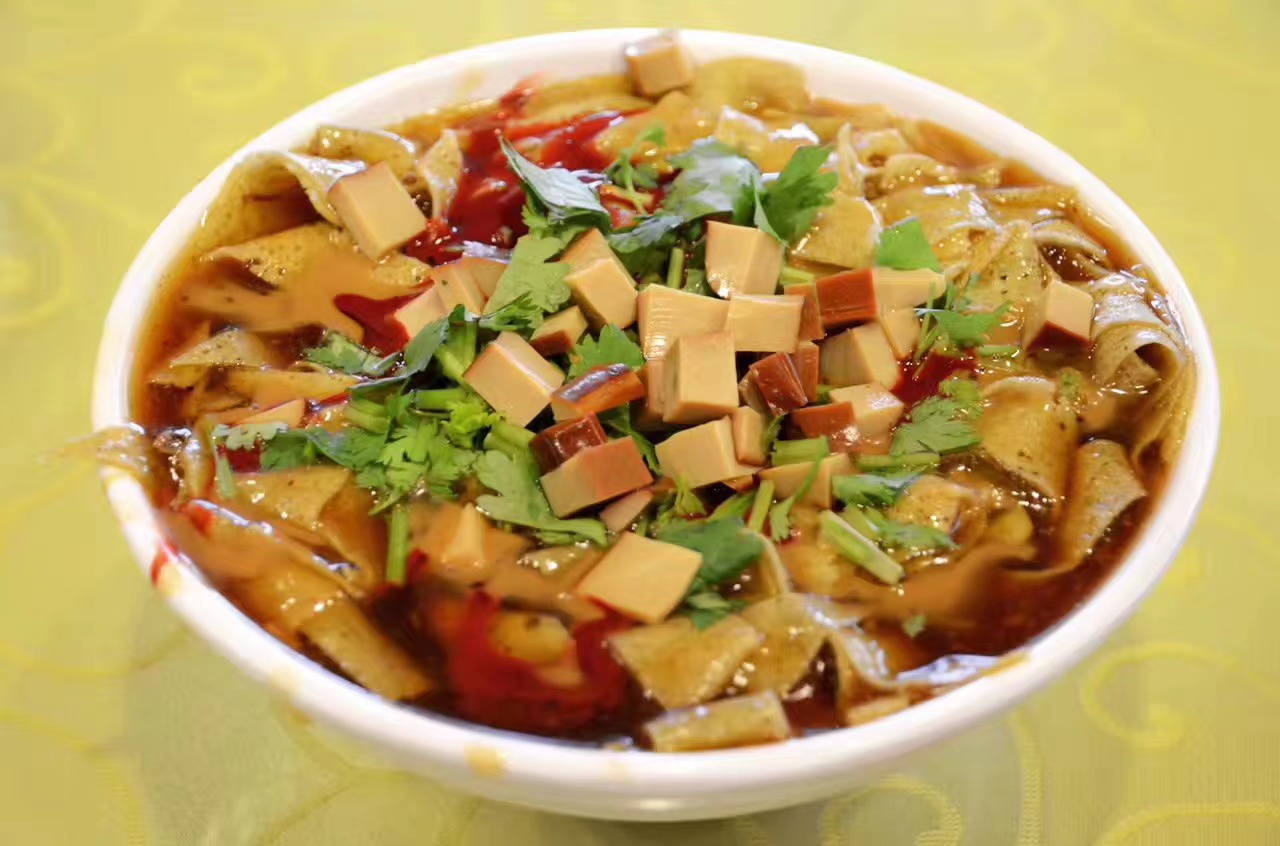
- Alternative names: Gaba cuisine
- Type: Breakfast, snack
- Place of origin: Qing dynasty, China
- Region or state: Tianjin
- Main ingredients: Mung beans, millet, five-spice powder, coriander

Guoba cuisine (in Tianjin dialect/kɑ^{21} bɑ^{1} ʦʰaɪ̯^{53}/, homophony in Mandarin sounds like "Gaba cuisine") is a typical breakfast in Tianjin, China. Although its origin is unknown, it is thought to have a history spanning over 300 years. Guoba cuisine is known for its pleasantly-salty taste. It was divided into two varieties, vegetarian and meat, but only the vegetarian version is still popular. Dafulai Guoba Cuisine is the most iconic and long-lasting brand of Guoba dishes in Tianjin. In 1997, Dafulai Guoba cuisine was ranked among the first batch of "Famous Chinese Snacks" by the Chinese Cooking Association. In 2009, its cooking techniques were added to the intangible cultural heritage of Tianjin. Guoba cuisine is most popular in Tianjin, but can also be found in Tianjin restaurants in Chinese communities across the U.S. and Canada.

== History ==
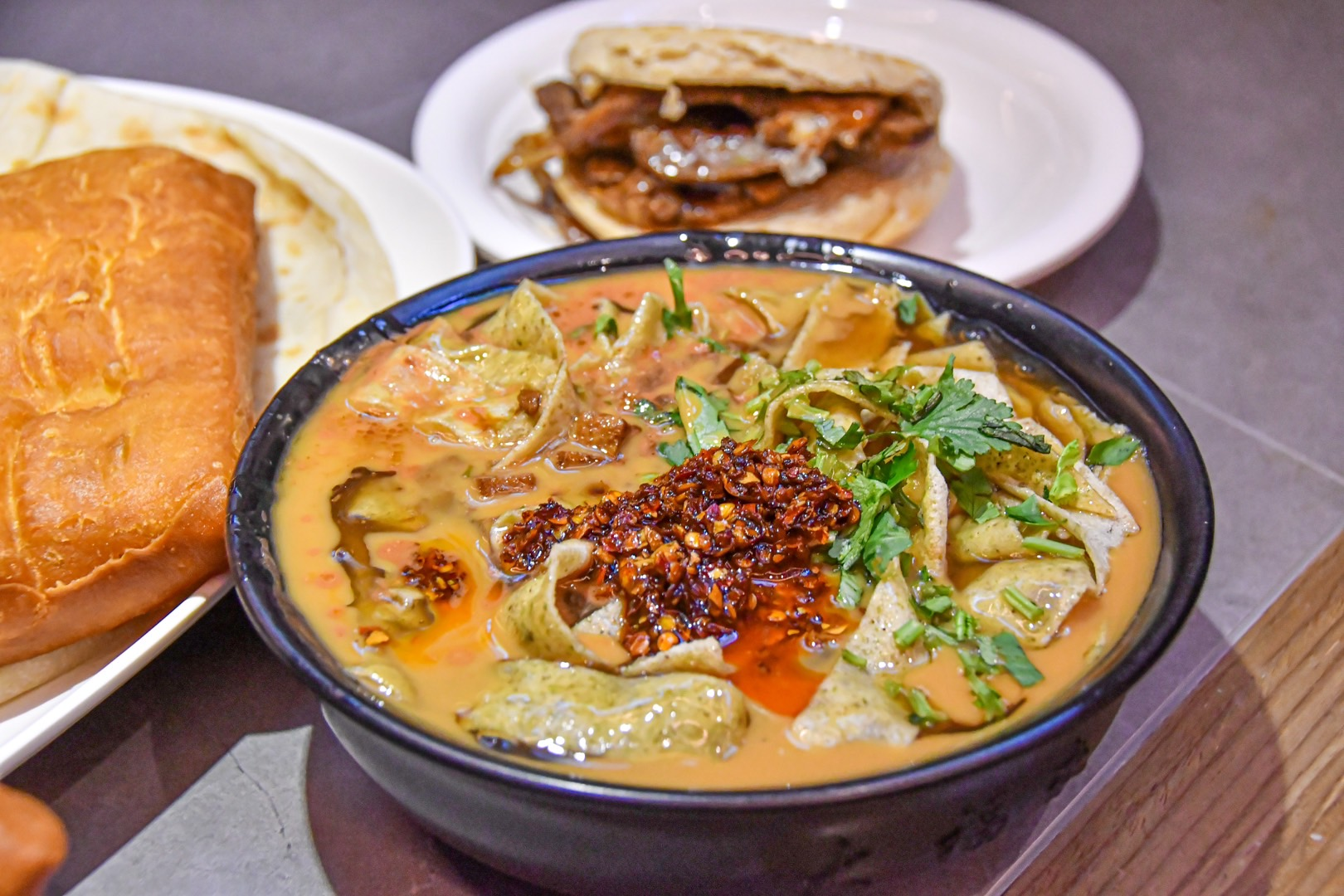
A Guoba-cuisine dish

Guoba cuisine is thought to have a history of over 300 years, but research is sketchy. Stories in Guidance of Local Specialty in Tianjin and Tianjin Folkways include accounts of examiners who passed Tianjin in the imperial civil examinations in Beijing who brought the dish to Tianjin, and the Qianlong Emperor in the Qing dynasty reportedly gave it its name. According to General Record of Tianjin-part2: Business Record, many people from Shandong province moved to Tianjin for work. They mung beans and rice into pastes, and used the pastes to make mung-bean pancakes. The pancakes were cut into pieces shaped like willow leaves, which were called "Guoba" ("Gaba" in the Tianjin dialect). Peddlers carried buckets of thick gravy, and sold pancakes and gravy on the street with condiments. The porridge-like dish became a staple food. During the Qing dynasty's Kangxi period, Pu Songling's "Ode to Pancake" described how the Shandong people made pancake porridge. Guoba cuisine may have originated in Dafulai; its cooking techniques were sourced from Zhang's Pancake Store, owned by Zhang Lan and Guo Ba in the 22nd year of the Qianlong period (1757).

Guoba cuisine is unique to Tianjin. Despite its history of over 300 years, few reliable reports remain of its early years. According to General Record of Tianjin: Folk Custom Record, breakfast shops and stalls dating back to the 1930s were all over the city; ten had established their own brands. As a result of the improvement of its cooking techniques and the quality of its ingredients, Guoba cuisine was popular in Tianjin and it appeared frequently in the city's breakfast shops in 1946; Dafulai and Wanshuncheng were the best-known shops. The Dafulai Guoba Cuisine store was in Tianjin's Hui district. Zhang Qifa, the second-generation founder of Dafulai, was successful with good ingredients and a variety of flavors. Wanshuncheng served the Han Chinese.

During the 1956 public–private partnership, all privately-owned Guoba Cuisine shops became state-owned and were listed as snack shops or breakfast stores. Dafulai's recipe and cooking techniques of Dafulai were passed from masters to apprentices instead of being handed down by the Zhang family by Zhang Fengxiang, last head of the Zhangs, in response to the government's mandate. Dafulai Guoba Cuisine became part of the Hongqiao District Catering Company and was integrated into the Dafulai breakfast department with an unknown number of shops. During the Cultural Revolution, sales of Guoba cuisine in Tianjin relied on the breakfast department of the state-owned catering companies. The Dafulai breakfast department, which primarily sold Guoba cuisine was known as the New Victory Breakfast Department and Large Western Bend Breakfast Department. The Tianjin Catering Company ranked the Dafulai Guoba cuisine from the Dafulai Guoba cuisine store in Hongqiao District among the ten best. When the appreciation was organized again in 1990, the Guoba Cuisine from the Zhenhua Breakfast shop in Hongqiao district retained its rank. Although Dafulai Guoba Cuisine cooking techniques was listed in the second batch of intangible cultural heritage in 2009, only Dafulai and a few other brands are still in operation; others, such as Wanshuncheng, Zhangmaolin, and Baohexuan, have disappeared.

== Cooking techniques ==
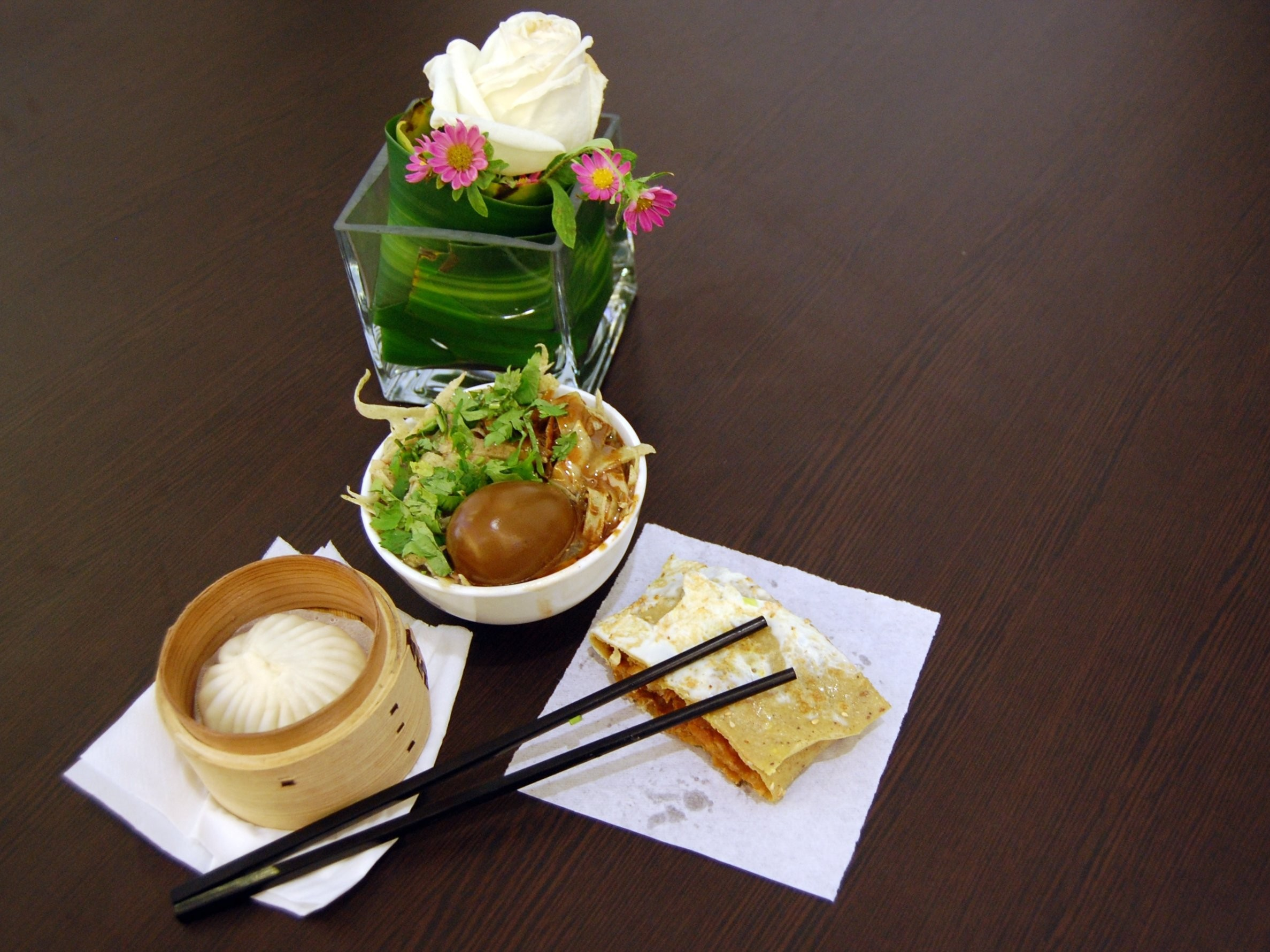
A Guoba-cuisine lunch, with a Goubuli baozi and Jianbing guozi

The Technical Standard and Criteria for Well-known Traditional Tianjin Speciality Snacks summarizes the mainstream cooking techniques of Guoba cuisine as a non-binding standard for industry groups. According to the standard, Guoba is made from ground mung beans and millet in a general 7:3 ratio, with water and seasonings added to make a batter. The resulting pancakes are cut into diamond- or willow-leaf-shaped pieces after cooling, and then air-dried. A thick gravy contains shallots, ginger, star anise, soy sauce and other condiments. The pancake and gravy, mixed with ground coriander, sesame sauce (or peanut butter), bean curd, chilli oil and other condiments, is known as Guoba cuisine. According to the General Record of Tianjin-two: Business Record, a traditional Guoba-cuisine shop also served it with freshly-fried, diamond-shaped pieces of smoked bean curd and fermented bean curd for flavour.

== Industry standard ==
The Technical Standard and Criteria for Well-known Traditional Tianjin Speciality Snacks series was drafted by a group led by the Tianjin Catering Industry Association with the support of the Tianjin Municipal Commission of Commerce and the Tianjin Municipal Market Supervision and Administration Commission in 2006. In addition to Guoba cuisine, Jianbing guozi, dried tuckahoe cake and Mahua are covered by the standard.

On May 16, 2018, the Tianjin Catering Industry Association published The Technical Standard and Criteria for Well-known Traditional Tianjin Speciality Snacks: Jianbing guozi. The standard is voluntary, and had sparked discussion. In January 2019, The Technical Standard and Criteria for Well-known Traditional Tianjin Speciality Snacks: Guoba Cuisine was published. The need for a unified standard for traditional Tianjin snacks such as Guoba cuisine has been questioned, with concerns expressed about excessive standardization.

== Culture and popularity ==
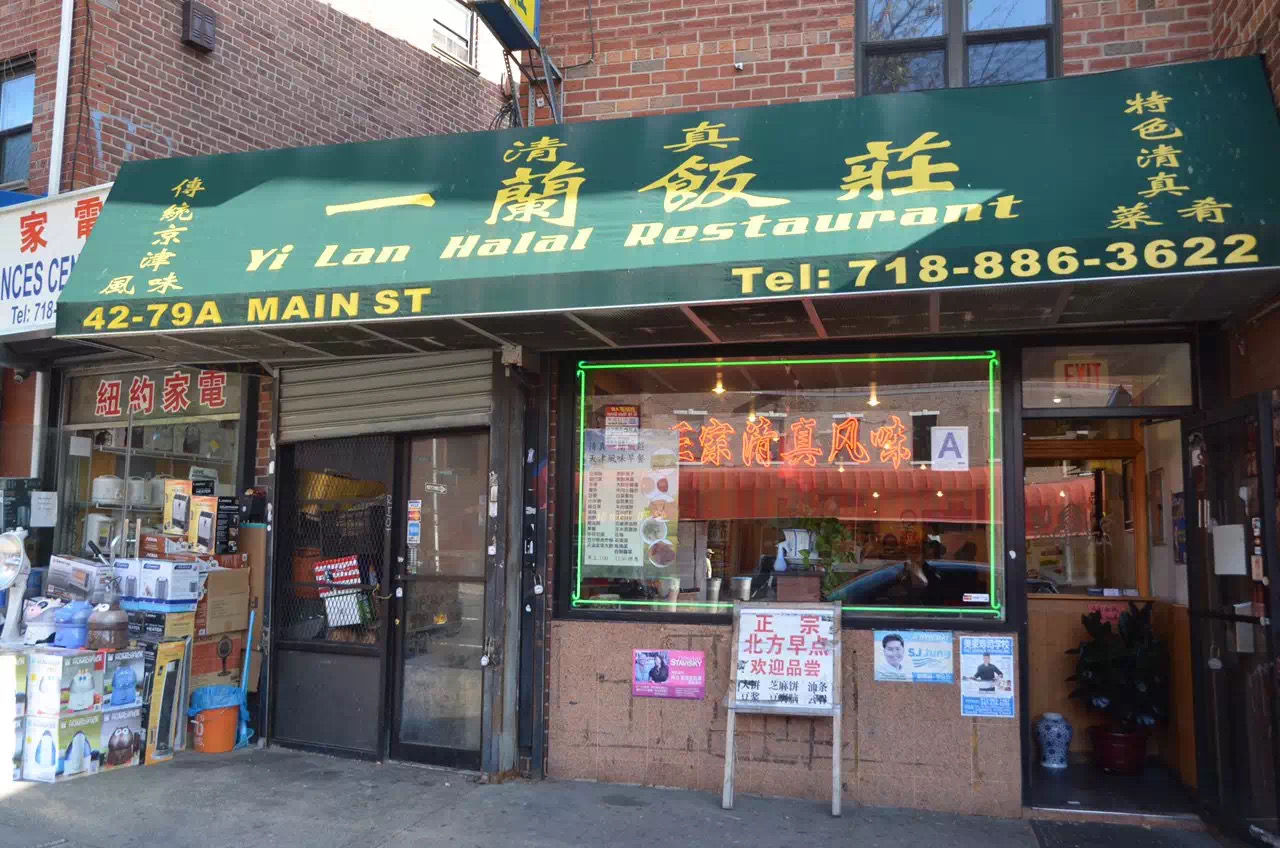
A Chinese restaurant which sells Guoba cuisine in New York City

Guoba cuisine, like jianbing guozi, is a popular breakfast dish in Tianjin and is often accompanied by sesame seed cakes.

=== Brands ===
During the 1940s, Dafulai and Wanshuncheng topped the Guoba-cuisine market in Tianjin. The Dafulai Guoba Cuisine shop served the Muslim Hui ethnic group, and Wanshuncheng served the Han ethnic group. Wanshuncheng was integrated into the Beijing-Tianjin snack shop on Liaoning Road before it disappeared. A number of local Guoba-cuisine brands had declined; only Dafulai and Zhensucheng are still in operation, and Zhangmaolin and Baohexuan have also disappeared. In 1956, the Dafulai Guoba Cuisine shop was merged into a state-owned catering company in the Hongqiao district and integrated into a number of breakfast shops. During the early years of Chinese reform and opening up, the name was revived. Dafulai Catering Management, founded in 2005, specializes in breakfast snacks which include Guoba cuisine. Zhensucheng, previously a sesame-oil brand, was nationalized in 1956. After decades of reorganization, it is a chain breakfast shop with over 20 locations.

=== Popularity ===
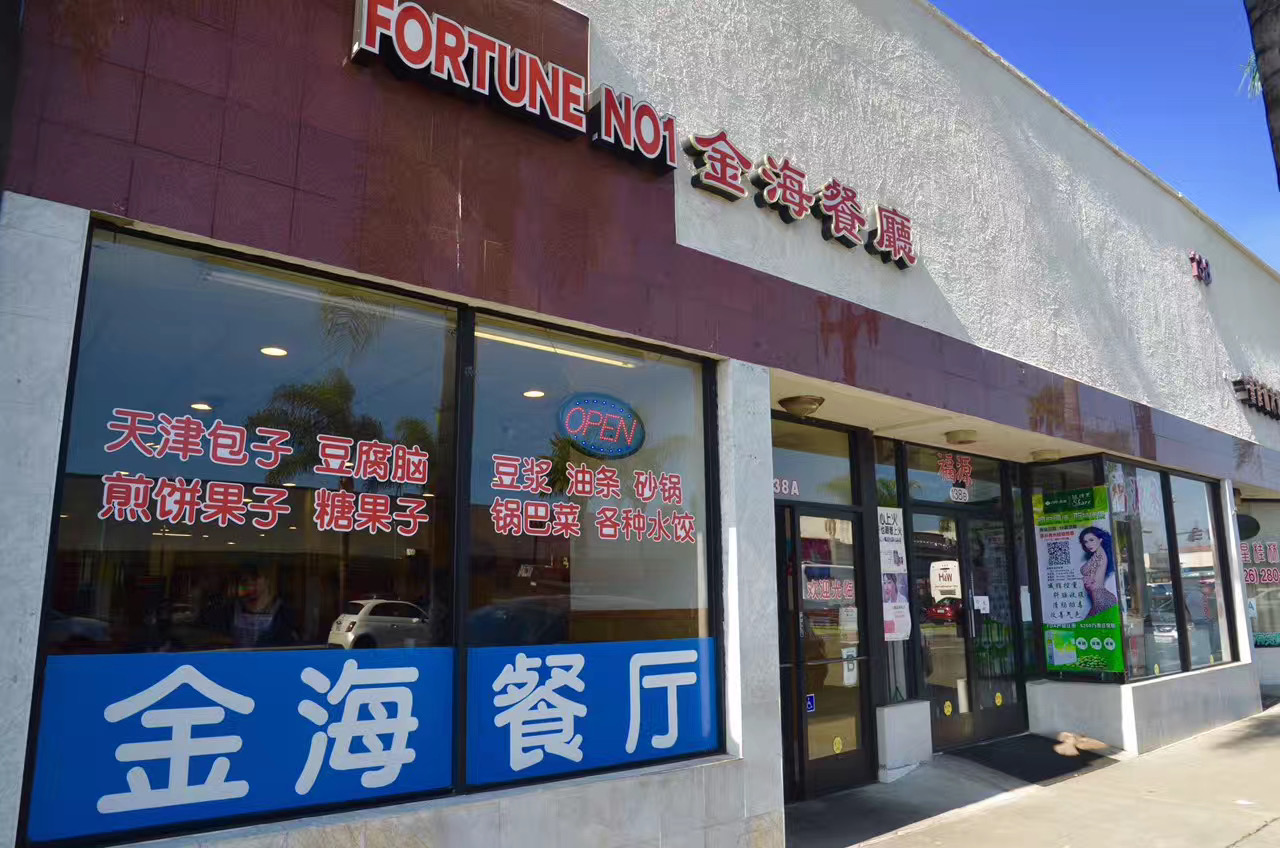
A Chinese restaurant in Monterey Park, California, which features Tianjin snacks such as Guoba cuisine

Guoba cuisine is popular with Tianjin's residents and the city's diaspora. Deng Yingchao, chair of the 6th Chinese People's Political Consultative Conference, enjoyed Guoba cuisine and jianbing guozi when she studied there. In interviews about Tianjin food, many Tianjin residents consider Guoba cuisine and jianbing guozi as typical staples.

Guoba cuisine is served to national leaders and guests from elsewhere in China and abroad. Former Chinese Chairman Liu Shaoqi praised the dish when he tasted it during his tour of Tianjin. In 2008, Minister of Commerce Chen Deming complimented the Dafulai Guoba cuisine when he held conferences in Binhai New Area. In foreign gatherings organized by the Tianjin government, Guoba cuisine, jianbing guozi and other snacks are served at the banquets. On January 26, 2020, almost 1,300 doctors and nurses were sent to Hubei to support the province's prevention and control of COVID-19. A group of cooks was also sent to prepare breakfast dishes such as Guoba cuisine and jianbing guozi for the doctors and nurses from Tianjin.

Guoba cuisine, less popular than jianbing guozi, is commonly seen only in Tianjin. It is difficult to produce on a large scale. As a representative of Tianjin cuisine, Guoba cuisine has been served in Tianjin-thened restaurants in Chinese areas of New York City, Monterey Park, California, and Niagara-on-the-Lake, Ontario, Canada. With the development of E-business, Guoba cuisine could also be purchased online.

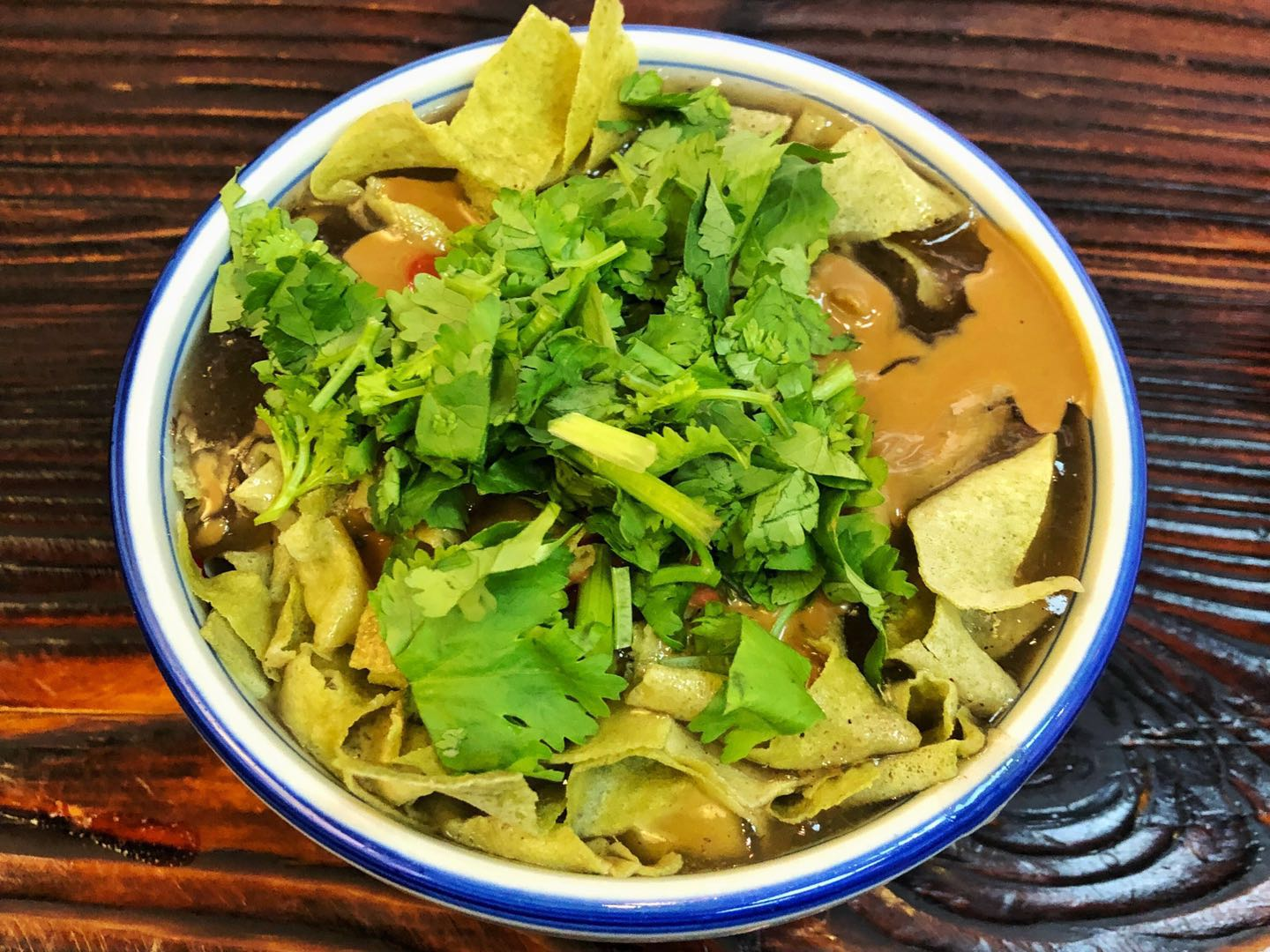
Guoba cuisine at a Tianjin restaurant in Shenzhen

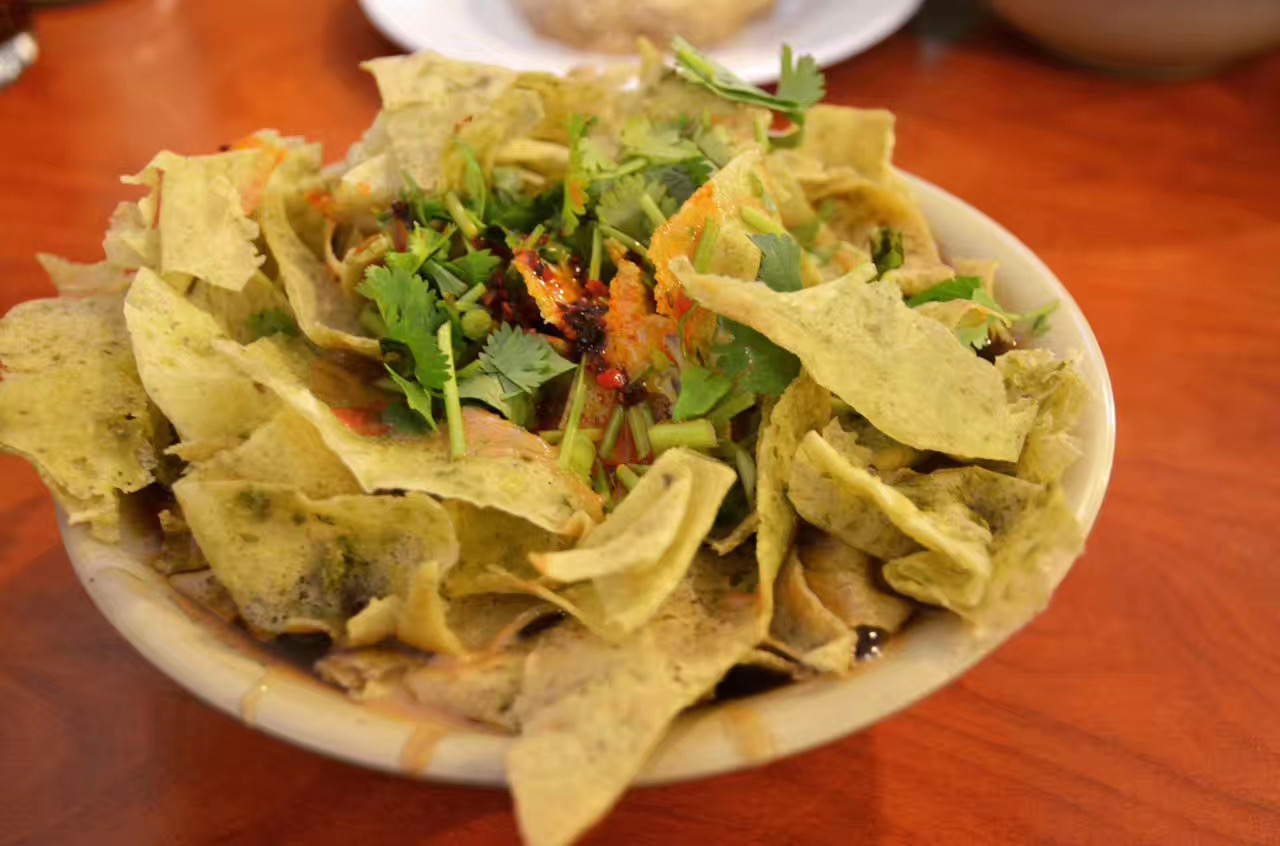
Guoba cuisine served at the Golden Sea Restaurant in Monterey Park, California

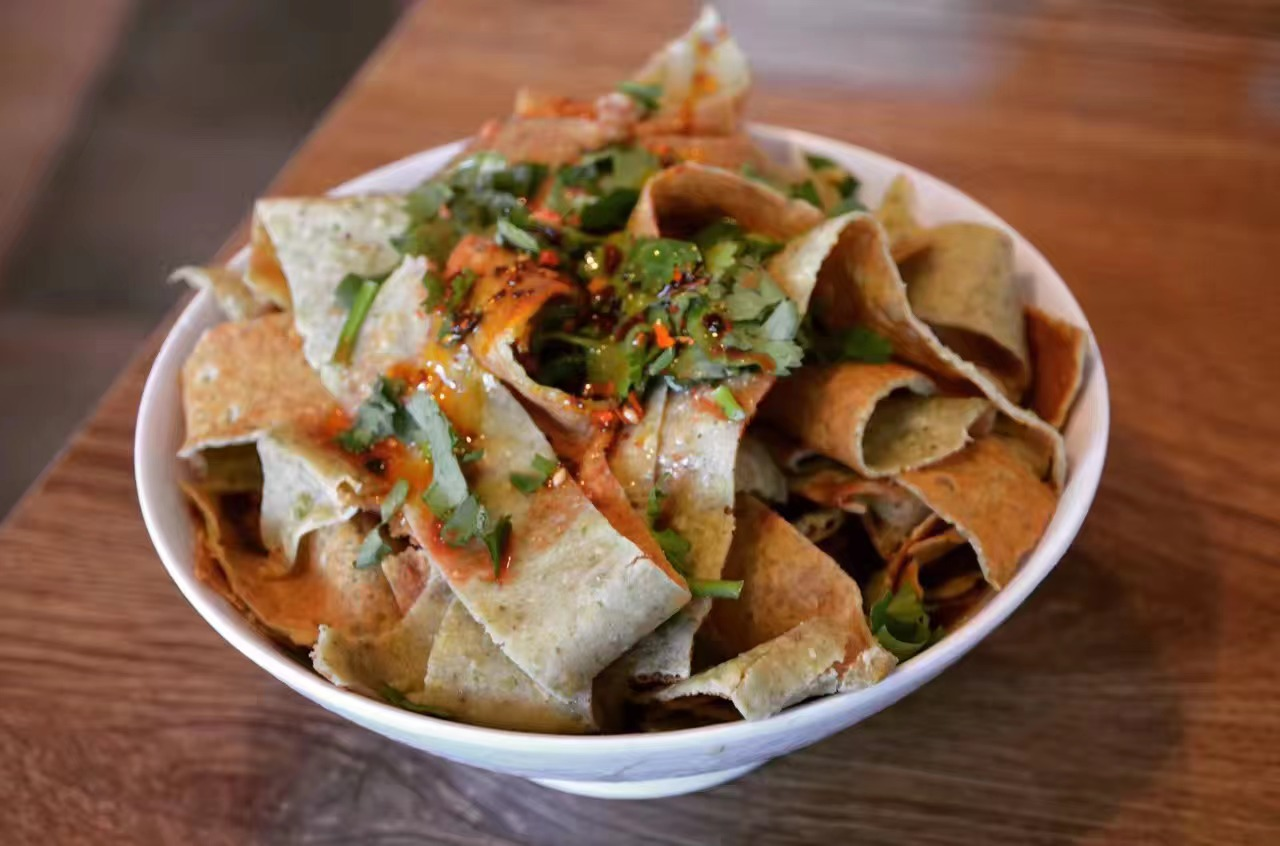
Guoba cuisine at a Tianjin breakfast shop in Niagara-on-the-Lake, Ontario, Canada

== See also ==
- Tianjin cuisine
- Jianbing guozi
- Wonton
