= Tianjin cuisine =

Culinary traditions of Tianjin, China

- Chinese: 天津菜
Transcriptions
Standard Mandarin
- Hanyu Pinyin: Tiānjīn cài

Jin cuisine
- Chinese: 津菜
Transcriptions
Standard Mandarin
- Hanyu Pinyin: Jīn cài

Tianjin cuisine (Tientsin cuisine), also known as Jin cuisine, refers to the native cooking styles of Tianjin, the largest port city in Northern China. Though heavily influenced by Beijing cuisine, Tianjin cuisine differs by being more focused on seafood. It is categorized by its freshness, saltiness and soft and crispy textures. Cooking methods include grilling, simmering, sautéing and steaming. With more than 300 years of history, the development of the Tianjin cuisine was highly dependent on the diet of boatmen and the salt trades due to its geographical location. Tianjin Food Street is a place where cross-cultural Chinese dishes may be found. Popular dishes include Eight Great Bowls, Four Great Stews, Tianjing goubuli, and Four Winter Delicacies, among others. Eight Great Bowls is a combination of eight different meat dishes. The Four Great Stews refers to a very large number of stews, including chicken, duck, seafood, beef, and mutton. Tianjin also has several famous snack items. Goubuli (狗不理包子) is a classic steamed stuffed bun (baozi) that is well-known throughout China. Guifaxiang (桂发祥麻花) is a traditional brand of mahua (twisted dough sticks).

== Development ==
Tianjin cuisine was officially formed in 1662, when the first of eight most famous restaurants in Tianjin, Ju Qing Xing, was opened to congratulate the enthronement of Kangxi Emperor. In 1860, Tianjin became a treaty port and allowed the influx of foreign investment. Western cuisine has since then been introduced to the Tianjin cuisine. The most typical example is Kiessling's, the first foreign restaurant in Tianjin, founded by German Albert Kiessling.

Today, the Tianjin diet is mainly categorized into Hanmin (Han Chinese) cuisine, Islamic cuisine, Tianjin vegetarian cuisine and local snacks.

== Differences between Tianjin and Beijing cuisines ==
One of the most distinctive traits involves Tianjin's higher use of seafood, particularly river fish and shrimp. This is primarily attributed to Tianjin's proximity to the sea. Although Beijing and Tianjin cuisines are both salty in the first taste, the latter contains the additional use of sugar, which results in a distinctive flavor. Those new to the Tianjin cuisine will immediately identify a slightly sweet taste embedded in the savory flavor.

Tianjin cuisine also uses more mutton and less pork in comparison to Beijing cuisine, and in the event of traditional holidays, mutton is a must for holiday dishes. In addition, the vegetables and meat are served separately from the noodles in Tianjin cuisines yet in Beijing, they are served together with the noodles.

Finally, Tianjin cuisines are partially influenced by neighbouring countries such as Russia and Japan. Scholars attribute this to the city's location as a treaty port, making its culture and, by extension, its cuisine more complex than other major Chinese cities such as Beijing.

== Nanshi Cuisine Street ==
Nanshi Cuisine Street (南市食品街) holds more than 100 restaurants covering about 40,000 square metres in the area in Tianjin's Heping District. Notable establishments include Zheijiang Restaurant, Da Jin Haiwei, which specializes in seafood, and Erdouyan Fried Cake Shop, a century-old institution known for its rice-powder cakes that are fried in sesame oil.

== Notable dishes in Tianjin cuisine ==
English	Traditional Chinese	Simplified Chinese	Pinyin	Picture	Notes
Chatang	茶湯	茶汤	chátāng		Chatang is Tianjin's traditional snack. It is made of baked millet and glutinous millet flour. The soup is made by pouring boiling water into the mixed flour and then adding sugar or brown sugar. Traditionally, the water is boiled in a big copper tea kettle whose spout is usually fashioned into a dragon's head. While making the soup, the skilled Chatang maker pours the boiling water from a distance and significant height into customers' bowls.
Ear-hole fried cake	耳朵眼炸糕	耳朵眼炸糕	ěrduō yǎn zhá gāo		A traditional Tianjin local snack. It derived its name from the narrow Ear-Hole Street in Tianjin's Beidaguan, where the shop selling it was located. This dish has a history of over 80 years. It was introduced by a man named Liu Wanchun, who peddled it on a single-wheel barrow from street to street. When his business prospered, he rented a room and opened Liu's Fried Cake Shop. Because the fried cake he made was of high quality, reasonably priced and had a special flavor, it soon became a popular snack. The cake is made of carefully leavened and kneaded glutinous rice dough. It is filled with bean paste made with good-quality red beans. The pastry of the finished cake is golden in color, crisp and crunchy, while the filling is tender and sweet with a lingering flavor.
Goubuli baozi	狗不理包子	狗不理包子	gǒu bù lǐ bāo zǐ		Goubuli Baozi is known as Tianjin's homegrown snack. They are steamed buns stuffed with meat or vegetables. "Goubuli" literally means "dog doesn't care". This snack was created in the late Qing dynasty by a man from Wuqing Country whose nickname was "Dog". At the age of 14, Dog left home and came to Tianjin, where he became an apprentice at a restaurant specializing in baozi. A diligent and honest young man, Dog eventually opened a shop of his own. As his baozi tasted better and had a unique flavor, they attracted an increasing number of customers. As time went by, his nickname became known far and wide. Later, people changed his nickname from "Dog" to "Dog doesn't care" because he was often too busy to speak to his customers. His baozi was then named after his nickname. Today, with its main outlet located at Shandong Road, Heping District, the Goubuli Baozi Shop has developed into a corporation with 90 branch restaurants in Tianjin and 24 other Chinese cities. In addition to over 90 varieties of a stuffed bun, its restaurants also offer more than 200 dishes.
Guobacai	鍋巴菜	锅巴菜	guōbācài		A snack of strong local flavor, Guobacai is a sort of pancake made of millet and mung bean flour. The pancake is sliced into linguine-like noodles and cooked in the sauce made of sesame oil, chopped ginger, soy sauce, preserved beancurd and green onions. Guobacai is often served along with fried dough and sesame cakes for breakfast.
Mahua	麻花	麻花	máhuā		Although plain in look, this queue-shaped fried dough is not easy to make. Each bar of dough is made with quality flour and then fried in peanut oil. The bars are usually stuffed with a variety of fillings, most often the waxy tasting sweet bean paste. Mahua can be preserved for several months.
Tanghulu	糖葫蘆	糖葫芦	táng húlu		It is customary in Tianjin to eat Tanghulu on the eve of the Lunar New Year. The most popular tanghulu is made of hawthorn berries. Hawthorn berries have their seeds removed and are skewered on a thin bamboo stick, then dipped in hot syrup. When they turn cool, the stringed berries wrapped in crystallized sugar look like beautiful stone beans pungently sweet and sour. Sometimes, the hollowed hawthorn berries are filled with red bean paste, walnut and melon seeds. Today, in addition to hawthorn, a wide variety of tanghulu has been developed, including water chestnut, tangerine, apple, pear and crab-apple, etc.
Tianjin preserved vegetable	天津冬菜	天津冬菜	Tiānjīn dōng cài		A type of pickled Chinese cabbage similar to the salt pickled vegetable of Guizhou cuisine. The former takes much longer to prepare than the latter, usually half a year. Another clear distinction between the two is that instead of having two separate steps of salt pickling and then fermentation, the salt pickling and fermentation is combined in a single step that takes a longer time. The Chinese cabbage is mixed with salt and garlic together and then fermented, which creates the unique garlic flavor and golden color. In order to preserve the unique taste, Tianjin preserved vegetable is often used for soups and fish dishes or stir-fried and eaten.
Jian bing guo zi	煎餅餜子/煎餅果子	煎饼馃子/煎饼果子	jiān bǐng guǒ zī		Jian bing guo zi is a popular breakfast option among Tianjin people. It had been granted as one of the most beloved street breakfasts in China. Jian bing guo zi is most commonly seen in Tianjin, where it’s originally developed in 1933, but has traveled all over the country and made multiple variations. A typical, authentic serve of Jian bing guo zi is made of a piece of Jianbing (煎饼, Chinese crepe), Guobi (馃篦, deep-fried crack) or Youtiao (油条, deep-fried strip), with an egg evenly daubed on the crepe and smeared with Tianmianjiang (甜面酱, sweet bean sauce). Before the 1980s, Jian bing guo zi were made of mung bean flour and millet flour, and eggs were not used to spread the Jianbing. Additionally, the auxiliary ingredients only included Tianmianjiang sauce and chopped green onion. After the 1980s, the mainstream practice of Jian bing guo zi gradually developed: according to the standard of the process of Jian bing guo zi published in 2018 (《天津地方传统名吃制作加工技术规范 天津煎饼馃子》), Jianbing (the curst of Jian bing guo zi) should be made of mung bean flour, millet flour, eggs, wheat flour, and the auxiliary materials include Tianmianjiang sauce, Furu (fermented bean curd), chopped green onion, chili oil, etc.
Zeng beng carp	罾嘣鯉魚	罾嘣鲤鱼	zēng bèng lǐ yú		Zeng beng carp, or sweet and sour carp, is made with deep-fried carp with scales. It is named because the shape of the fish in the dish looks lively like struggling and jumping in a Zeng net (罾网). The carp is first marinated with a series of blended seasoning, then it’s placed in a Zeng, a type of bamboo basket designated for fishing, and immerse the Zeng in a wok full of steaming-hot oil, making the carp in the shape of Beng (leap and sizzle), and finally, the fish is served with heated sweet and sour sauce. It is characterized by its crispy fish bones, tender meat, and the great signature taste of sweet and sour. Especially when the sauce is poured during the serving, the aroma is overflowing. Traditionally, the sweet and sour sauce for Zeng beng carp is a joint of the various ingredients in Tianjin: Laochou (老抽, aged soy sauce), ginger, garlic, red and green pepper, Duliu vintage vinegar, Prickly Ash Oil (Sichuan Peppercorn Oil), etc. As the hot fish absorbs the hot juice, the "squeaking" sound after the deep-fry is endless. The Se (Look), Xiang (Fragrance), and Wei (Taste) all combined to make the dish of Zeng beng carp especially interesting to eat.
Su shi jin	素什錦	素什锦	sù shí jǐn		Su shi jin, or mixed vegetable, is one of the earliest Tianjin halal foods. Most of the ingredients used in Su shi jin are taken from natural plants or their processed products, such as gluten, tofu, Fu zhu (bamboo shaped bean curd), bean skin, shiitake mushroom, cucumber, lotus seed, carrot, bamboo shoot, Chinese cabbage etc. The use of ingredients with strong aromas is forbidden: Su shi jin is served without green onion or garlic, and the seasonings are carefully selected, which can be described as rich in ingredients, simple and clean, also known as Luohan zhai (Buddha's Delight).

== See also ==
- Tenshindon, a Japanese Chinese dish named after Tianjin
- List of Chinese dishes
