= Nanshi Cuisine Street =

Area of Tianjin, China

Nanshi Food Street (Chinese: 南市食品街; pinyin: Nánshì Shípǐn Jiē) is located in Nanshi, the busiest section of the city's downtown area of Tianjin, China. Constructed in 1984, it is a national, classic and palatial architectural complex. Nanshi Cuisine Street resembles an ancient walled city enclosed by a circle of three-story buildings. There is a crossroad in the "city," and at the centre of the crossroad is a musical fountain. The entire structure is covered with a glass roof of green glazed roof tile in a colored pattern.

Nanshi Cuisine Street houses over 100 shops trading in cuisines from across China.

== Attractions ==
=== Seafood ===
Nanshi Cuisine Street is particularly known for its seafood, caught in the port area of Tanggu. In accordance with Chinese custom, the fish is brought live to your table for your approval before being prepared.

=== Snacks from Tianjin ===
Tianjin cuisine is known for inexpensive and popular snacks, including Goubuli stuffed buns, mahua and jianbing guozi.

=== Chinese crafts ===
There are also Yangliuqing New Year Pictures (nianhua), Zhang's Clay Sculptures, Wei's Kites and other folk arts been sold on the street.

The clay sculptures are famous in Tianjin, especially those made by Zhang family. Unlike the colorful clay sculptures from other parts of China, the works by the Zhangs are a reflection on life; the eyes of these small mud men sculptures express sorrow, happiness, joy and frustration. The Zhang's and other shops selling these sculptures can be found on the street.

The New Year Pictures (nianhua) of Yangliuqing combine delineation, woodcarving, overprinting, color painting and mounting techniques; and feature smooth lines, elaborate techniques in color paintings.
