= Chatang =

Gruel in Beijing and Tianjin cuisine

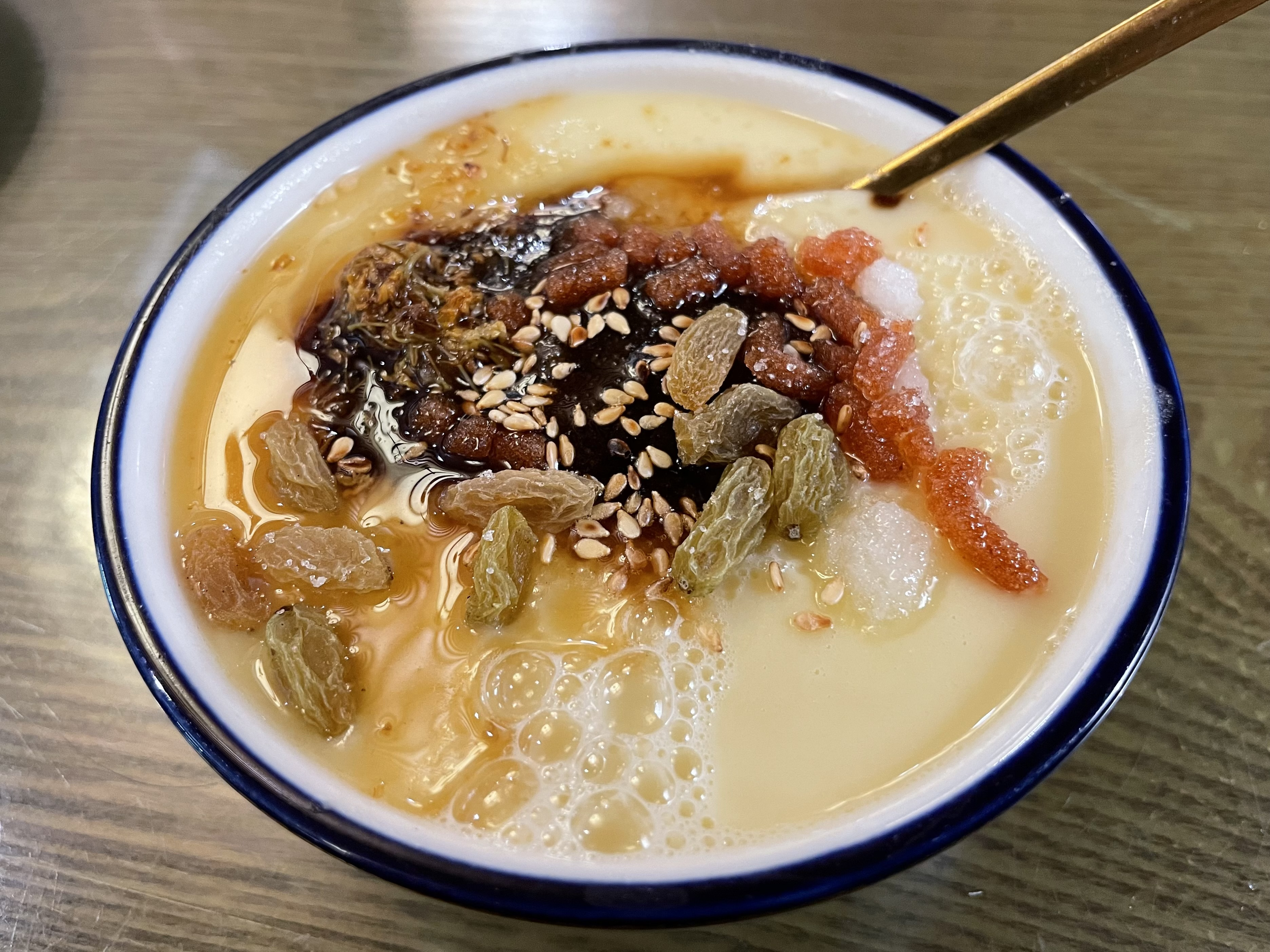
- Beijing-style millet chatang with syrup, osmanthus jam, sesame seeds, raisins and hawthorn jelly
- Alternative names: Miancha
- Type: Porridge
- Place of origin: China
- Main ingredients: Glutinous millet, sorghum, broomcorn millet, proso millet or wheat flour

Chatang (Chinese: 茶汤; pinyin: chátāng; lit. 'tea soup') or seasoned flour mush is a traditional gruel common to both Beijing cuisine and Tianjin cuisine, and is often sold as a snack on the street. Depending on the region, it can be made using flour from one or more of a number of grains, including sorghum, broomcorn millet, proso millet, glutinous millet or wheat. The Chinese name is figurative, not literal, as there is neither any tea nor any soup in this dish.

== Preparation ==
The dish is prepared in two steps. First, the flour is cooked in advance, often by stir-frying. When a customer orders the dish, hot water is poured into a bowl containing the flour(s) to create a paste-like mush, which is served with white and/or brown sugar and sweet osmanthus jam (桂花酱; guìhuā jiàng). The sweet osmanthus plant is not native to northern China.

Traditionally, the skill of the server was judged on several factors and one of them is regarding the resulting mush: the most skillful server would be able to create the mush so thick that when a chopstick is inserted into the mush it remains vertical, while at the same time, the mush remains fluid. Other criteria for the servers' skills included the ability not to splash any hot water outside the bowl and spill out any flour, because traditionally, all ingredients are placed in a bowl into which is poured boiling water from a special copper kettle with a long, dragon-shaped spout called lóngzuǐ dàtónghú (龙嘴大铜壶; 'dragon-mouth large copper kettle'), and special skills were needed to handle this equipment. The ingredients are then stirred together and the chatang is eaten with a spoon.

=== Seasoned millet mush ===
Seasoned millet mush (Chinese: 面茶; pinyin: miànchá; lit. 'noodle tea') in northern China is a savoury flour gruel. It is made using only millet flour rather than a combination of sorghum and millet flour. Rather than sweet osmanthus sauce and sugar, it is seasoned with sesame paste, ground Sichuan peppercorns, and salt.

In Fujian and Taiwan, the mush (Chinese: 麵茶; Pe̍h-ōe-jī: mī-tê) is a sweet snack made with wheat flour and seasoned with sugar and sesame seeds.

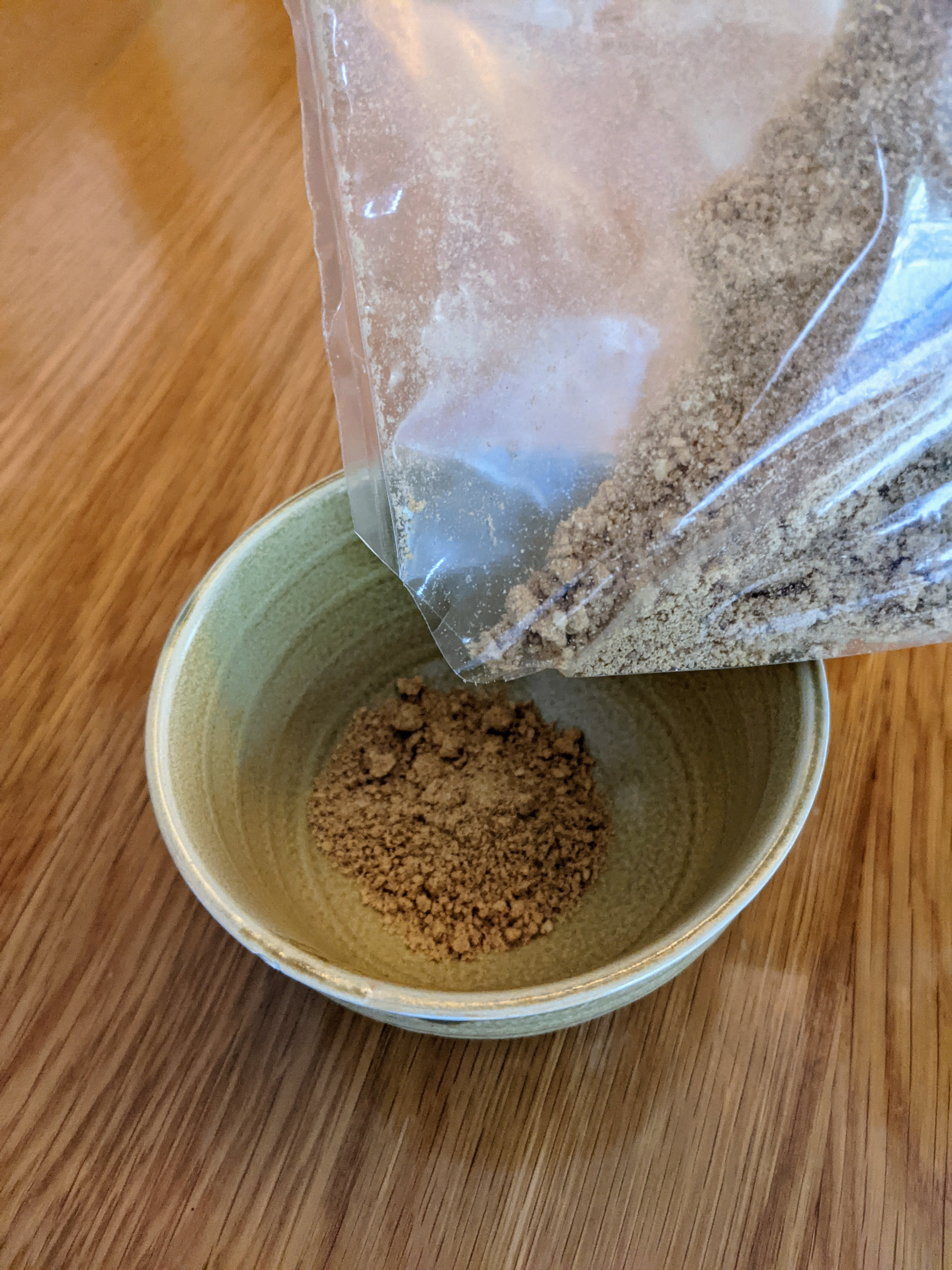
Dry Fujian-style miancha flour

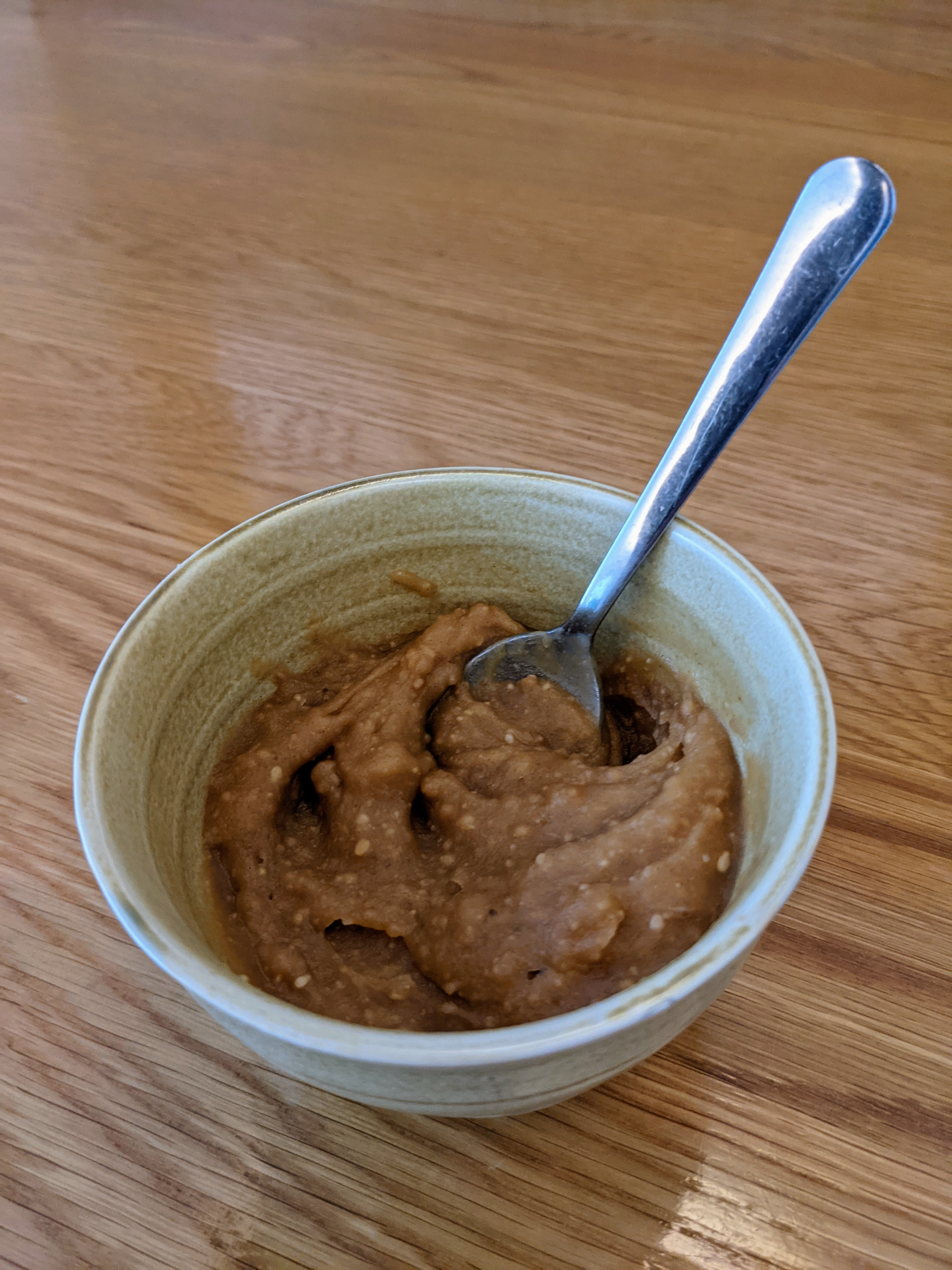
Prepared Fujian-style sweet miancha gruel

=== Seasoned oily flour mush ===
Seasoned oily flour mush (Chinese: 油茶; pinyin: yóuchá; lit. 'oil tea') is a variety of seasoned flour mush made by stir-frying, or sometimes pan-frying, the flour with animal fat, typically beef fat. Beef bone marrow may also be added. After frying, it is served in the same manner as seasoned flour mush.

== Kettle ==
Traditionally, chatang vendors were easily distinguished by the kettle they used. The kettle was extremely large, up to four feet tall with a diameter in excess of a foot, and was often made of copper. There are two kinds of kettles: those used by street vendors, and those found in restaurants and tea houses. The two differ in internal structure.

The kettles used by street vendors are double-layered, with fuel in the inner layer in the center and water in the outside layer, similar to samovars. The advantage of such a structure is that it reduces the need to carry a stove to heat the water in the kettle, and it improves fuel efficiency since most heat is utilized, in contrast to the use of a separate kettle and stove. Furthermore, in the windy weather conditions of northern China, such a structure prevents the flame from being blown out by the wind.

Despite the two varieties of kettles' identical external appearance, the complex structure of the kettles used by street vendors is not present for those used in restaurants and tea houses, for obvious reasons: since the stove is located inside, it is immune to the windy weather outside and stoves are necessary to cook other dishes, so there is no need to pay extra for a more expensive kettle with such a complex structure.

== Cultural representations ==
The different ways of serving seasoned flour mush have some cultural significance in distinguishing Beijing cuisine from Tianjin cuisine, since the same kind of seasoned flour mush tastes identical. Traditionally, the styles of serving were clearly different when the hot water is poured from the kettle:

The way hot water was poured in Beijing cuisine consisted of the server standing straight up, with legs spread apart greater than shoulder-width, while the upper body leaned toward the bowl. In contrast, the way hot water was poured in Tianjin cuisine involved the server being in a semi-squatting down position with body straight. Obviously, such a feat is rather dangerous, especially without any specialized training, and thus the special kettle has been phased out as modern technology enables the dish to be served like coffee, and the use of a kettle only survives in extremely rare occasions as a cultural heritage demonstration.

== See also ==
- Tsampa
- List of porridges
