= Ear-hole fried cake =

Chinese street food

- Alternative names: 耳朵眼炸糕 (Ěrduǒyǎn zhà gāo)
- Course: Snack
- Place of origin: China
- Region or state: Tianjin
- Created by: Liu Wanchun
- Main ingredients: Rice

Ear-hole fried cake (Chinese: 耳朵眼炸糕; pinyin: Ěrduǒyǎn zhà gāo) is a fried rice cake that is a popular street food in Tianjin, China. It was invented by a street vendor named Liu Wanchun (劉萬春) during the Guangxu Emperor's reign. Ear-hole fried cakes are considered a traditional food of Tianjin and are sold as street food, in restaurants, and commercially.

Traditionally, it is made of fried yellow rice bread. The bread is kneaded, filled with red bean paste, and covered in sugar. The cake is then fried until crispy.

Ear-hole fried cake is often referred to as one of the "Three Tianjin delights", (天津的“三绝”食品) along with mahua and goubuli.
