= Jianbing guozi =

Chinese stuffed pancake

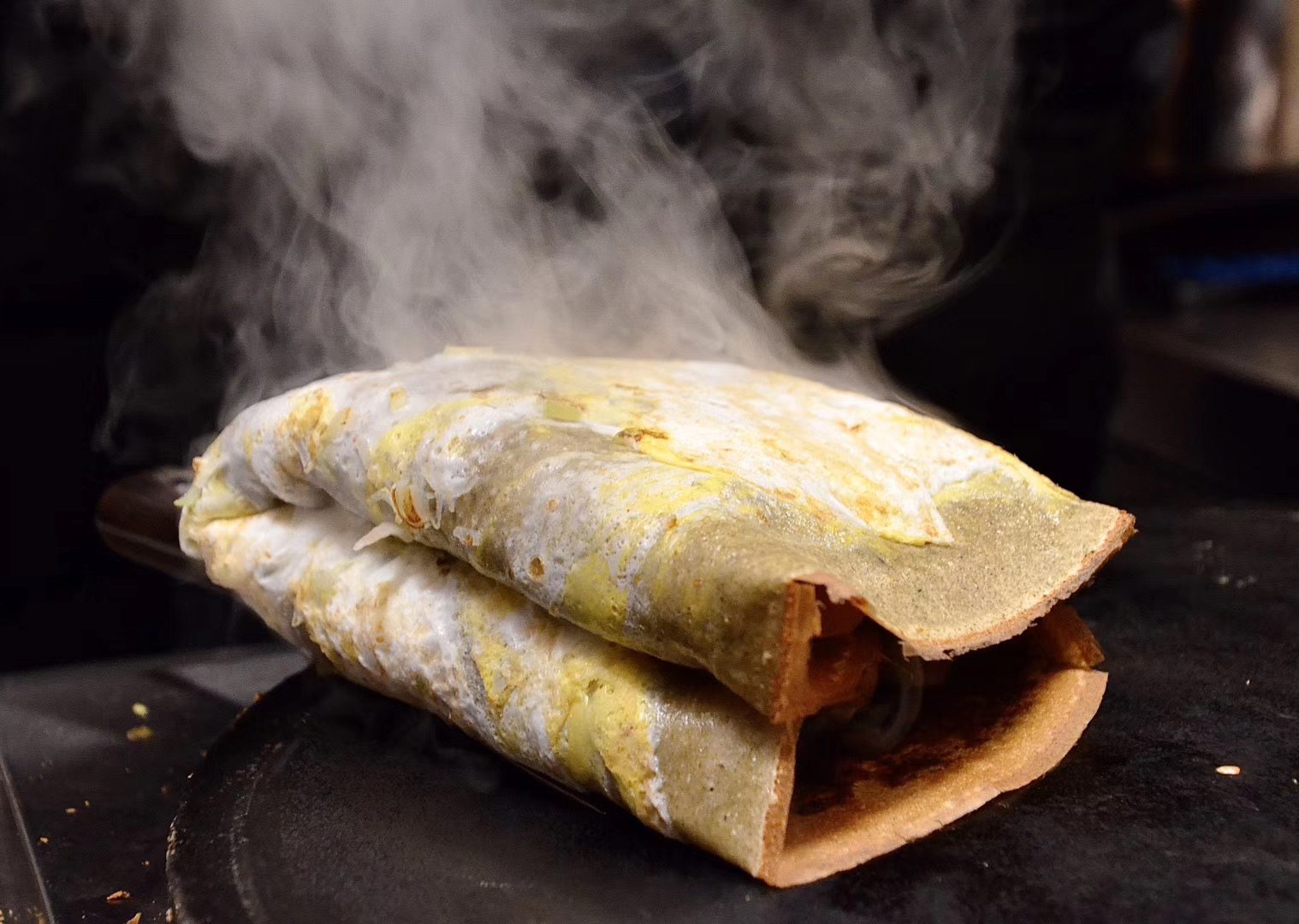
- Jianbing guozi
- Place of origin: China
- Region or state: Tianjin

Jianbing guozi (Chinese: 煎饼果子; pinyin: Jiānbǐng guǒzi, "deep-fried dough sticks rolled in a thin pancake") is a popular Chinese street food originating in Tianjin. The exact origin of the name jianbing guozi has not been verified. The term was first documented in the Tianjin Ta Kung Pao on 20 November 1933. In June 2017, the skill of making jianbing guozi was included in the municipal intangible cultural heritage list in Tianjin, and it is said to be "one of China's most beloved street breakfasts", especially in Tianjin and the neighboring province of Hebei. It is a sub-category of jianbing and consists of pancakes made from mung bean flour, eggs, and youtiao (fried dough sticks) or crispy "dragons" served with sweet bean sauce, diced green onion, and optionally chili sauce.

== History ==
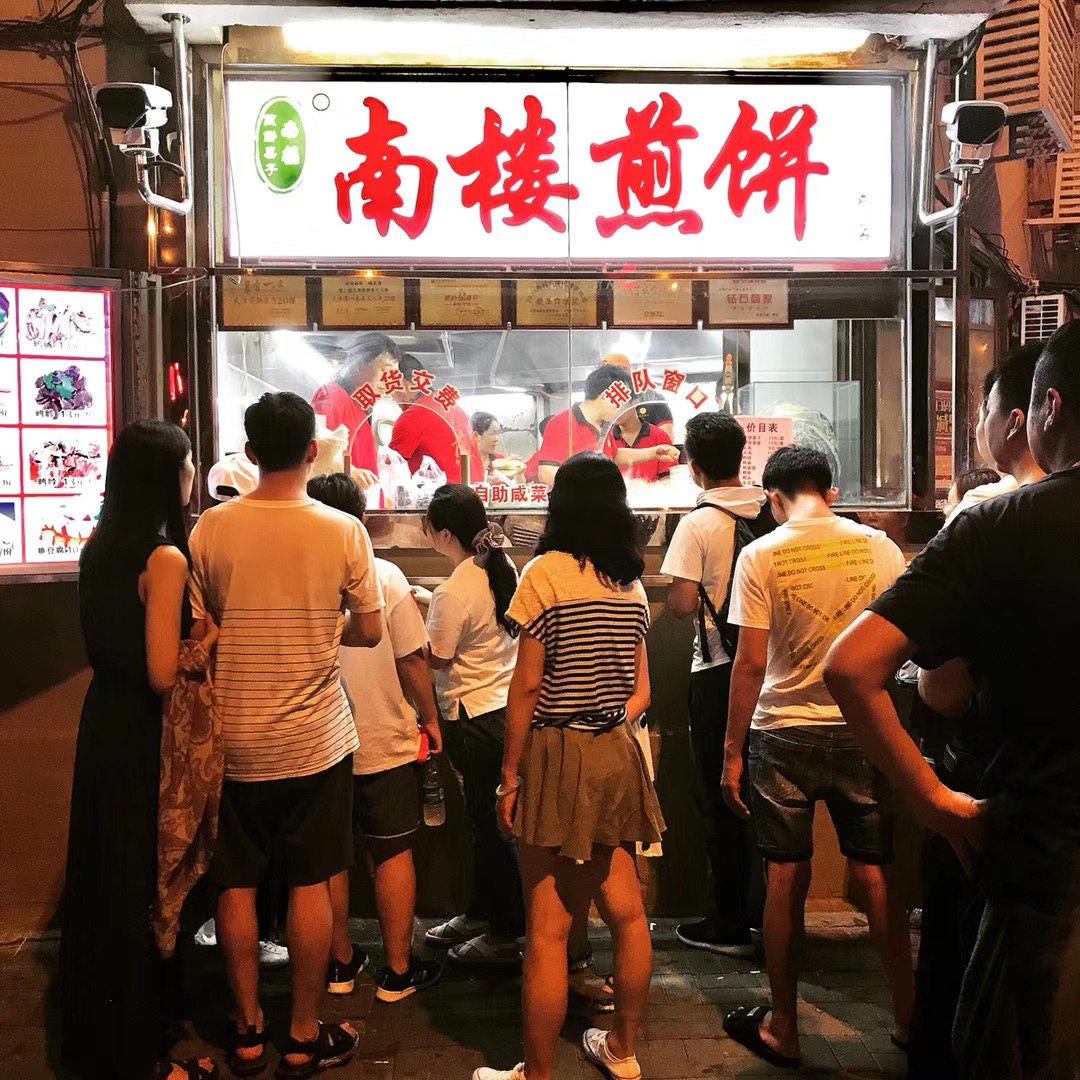
A Jianbing guozi stall in Tianjin

Jianbing guozi originated in Northern China. Its history can be traced back 2,000 years to Shandong during the Three Kingdoms period (220–280 AD). Legend holds that they were invented by Chancellor Zhuge Liang when he needed to feed his soldiers after they had lost their woks. He ordered the cooks to mix water with wheat flour to make batter and then spread it on shields, or flat copper griddles over a flame. The dish supposedly raised the soldiers' morale and helped them win the battle. After that, jianbing guozi was passed down through the generations in Shandong and gradually spread to different parts of China.

The article "Tiny Restaurant in Tianjin", the supplement of Ta Kung Pao, first appeared in modern newspapers and periodicals on 20 November 1933 and pointed out that the Jianbing was mostly sold as a midnight snack at that time. The earliest verifiable record about the method of making Tianjin jianbing guozi, from the article "Gossip about Tianjin," was published in the third issue of Jinjin Monthly in 1942, which records that "the method uses mung beans to grind juice and spread it into pancakes, mixed with shrimp and chopped green onion, fried in a flat pan, wrapped in gizzards, or supplemented with flour paste, which is extremely sweet."

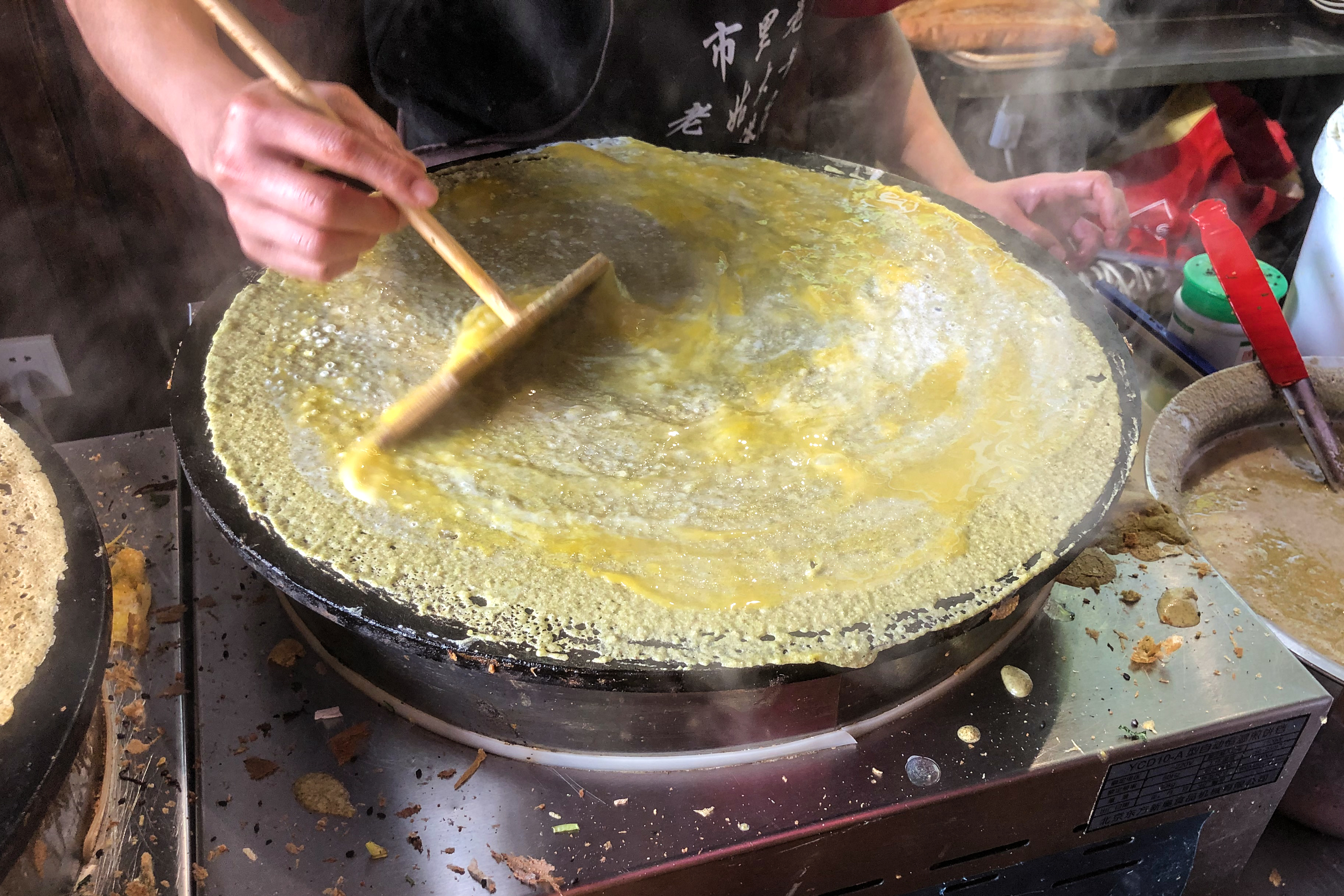
Jianbing guozi making process

In the 1950s, when public-private partnerships were established, most of the food sellers were not affected since they were small vendors. From the 1960s to the end of the Cultural Revolution, during which vendors were banned, the private vendors who sold this food disappeared in Tianjin for a while. They reappeared during the period of reform and opening up in the late 1970s. However, due to the long-term lack of night life for urban residents during the Cultural Revolution, food vendors that originally provided supper options gradually shifted to open in the mornings instead. This food was mainly used as a night snack, and gradually became the main choice for breakfast in Tianjin. However, due to the lack of materials during this period, the preparation and operation techniques of the materials were much rougher than those before the 1950s. Without five-spice powder, the taste was not as good as before, and at that time, the food was mostly prepared in advance before being sold, and it was processed twice when it was sold, rather than on-site. After the supplies gradually became more abundant, the ingredients of the food began to be refined, developed rapidly, and the ingredients were upgraded. A new variety of guozi with two slices began to appear. The practice of spreading eggs in this food became mainstream; eggs made the taste softer while also avoiding holes and breakages in the cake skin during spreading. At this time, there was a saying: "egg jianbing guozi".

In May 2008, relevant departments in Tianjin formulated a plan to require jianbing guozi vendors to unify their brand, appearance, and service methods, which also belonged to "actively guiding mobile carts to enter the store, guiding individual stores to develop chains, and guiding chain companies to create brands". The program is not feasible. In 2017, Zhang Baoyi, director of the Institute of Sociology of the Tianjin Academy of Social Sciences, called on the Tianjin government to support Tianjin's specialty snacks to go out of Tianjin.

== Cooking ==
Jianbing guozi is prepared by cooking a thin batter on a griddle to form a crepe-like pastry and topping it with savory spreads and fillings, then wrapping it, as illustrated below in five steps.

Pancakes are made of mung bean flour as the main ingredient and made into a paste. Spread into pancakes, shaped like lotus leaves, as thin as paper, then rolled with crispy sticks (fried dough sticks) or grates, spread with sauce, fermented bean curd, and chopped green onion, folded from the middle to eat, and can also be served on pancakes Spread the eggs on top.

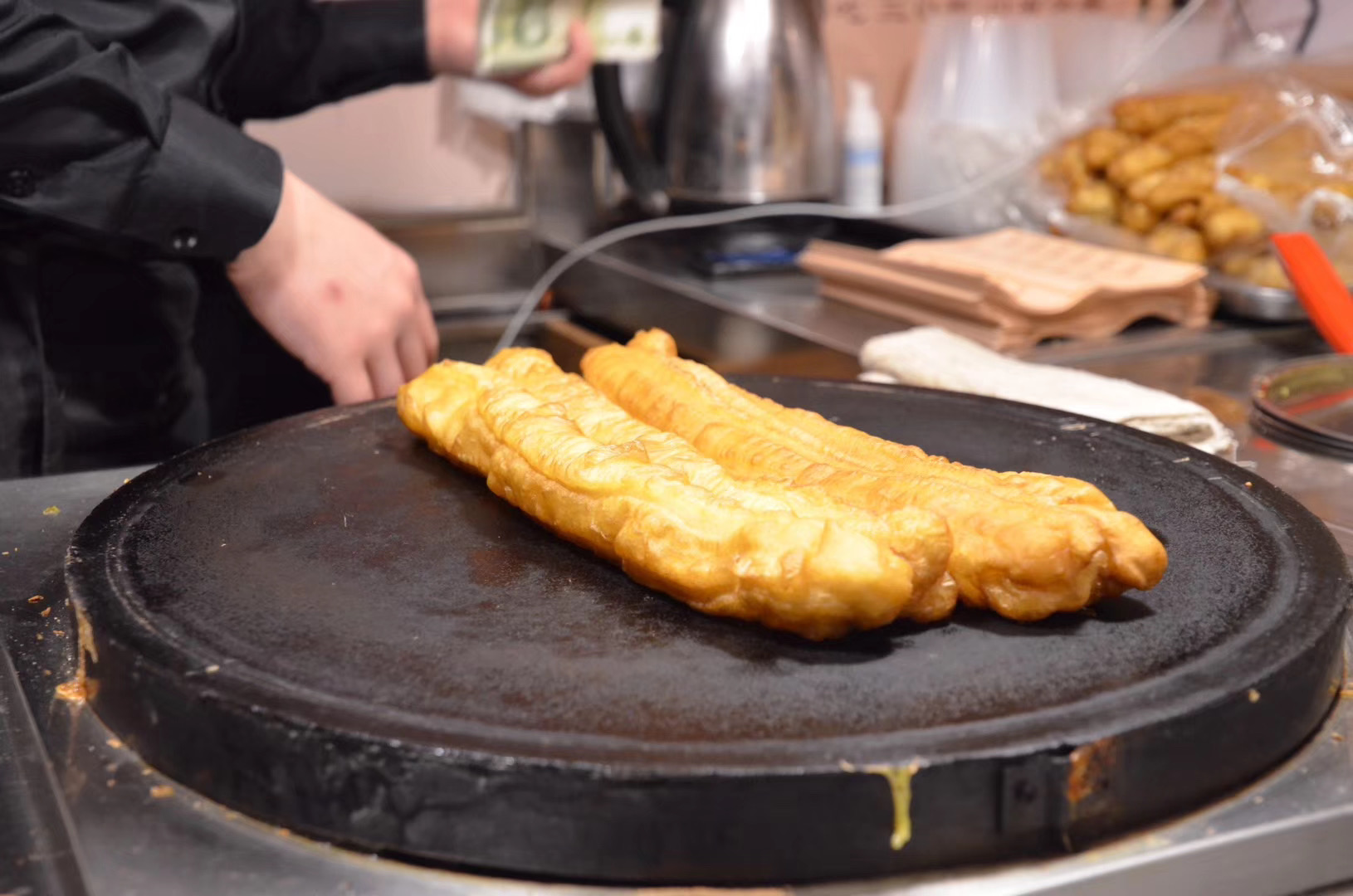
Step 1

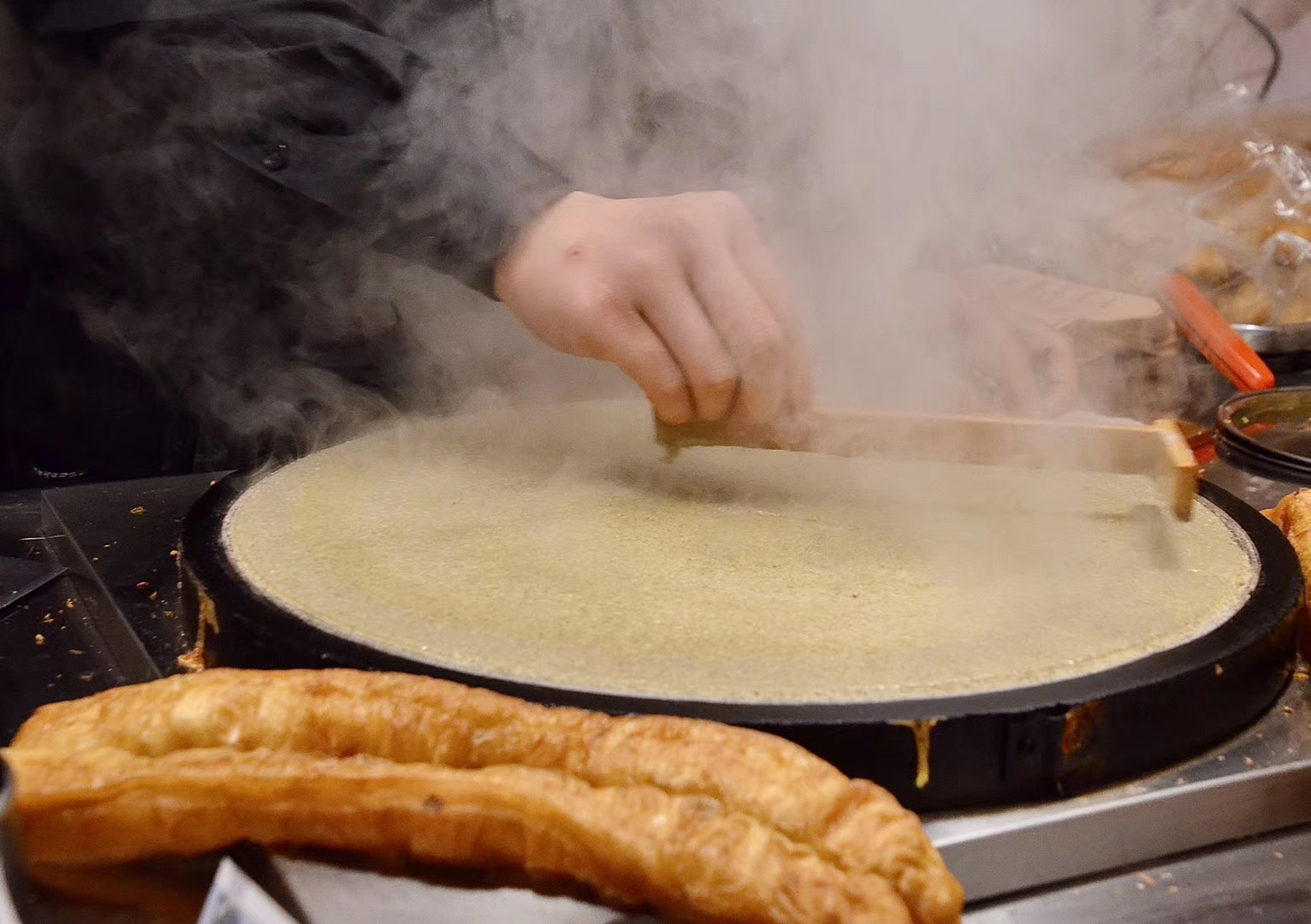
Step 2

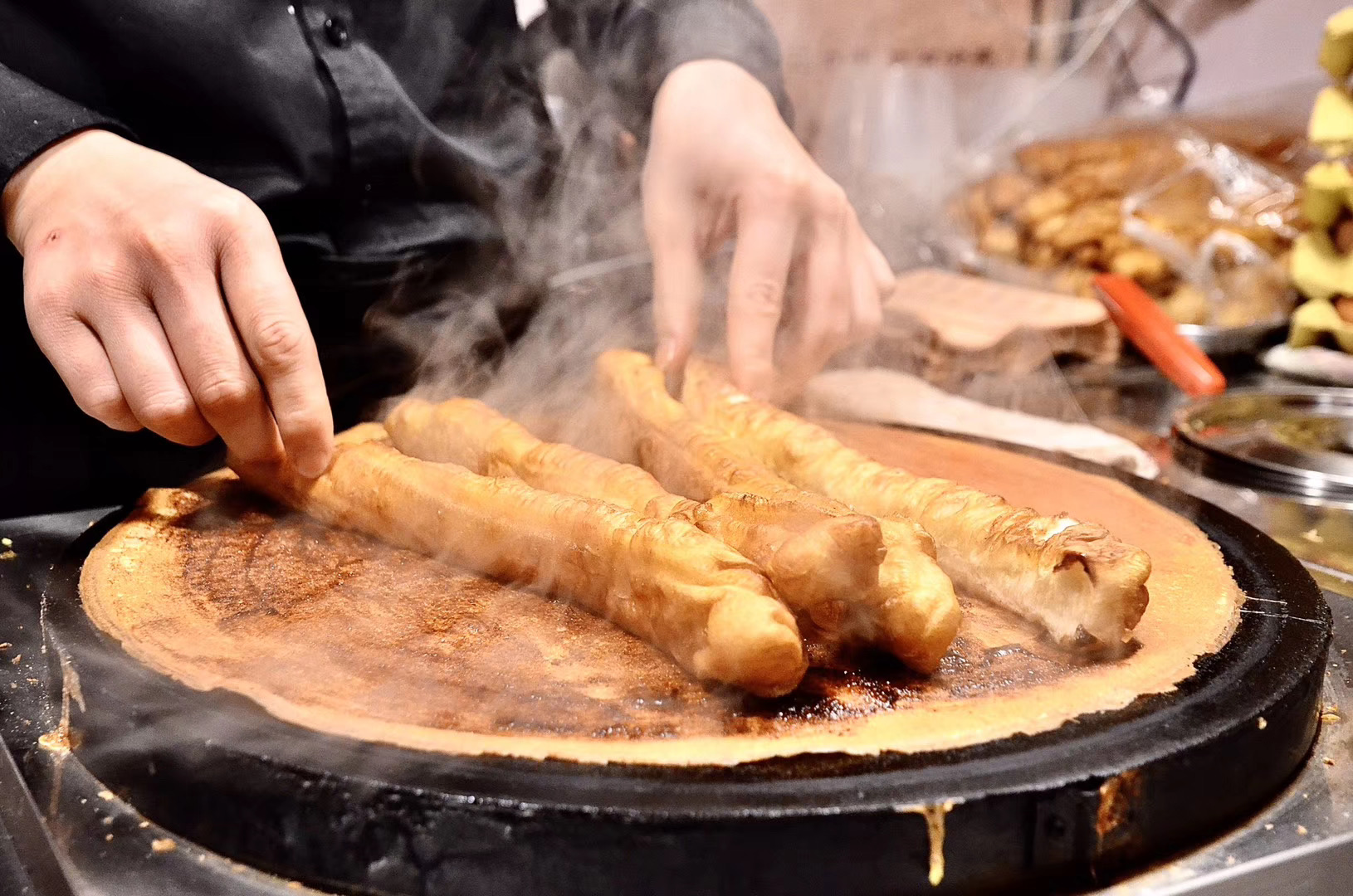
Step 3

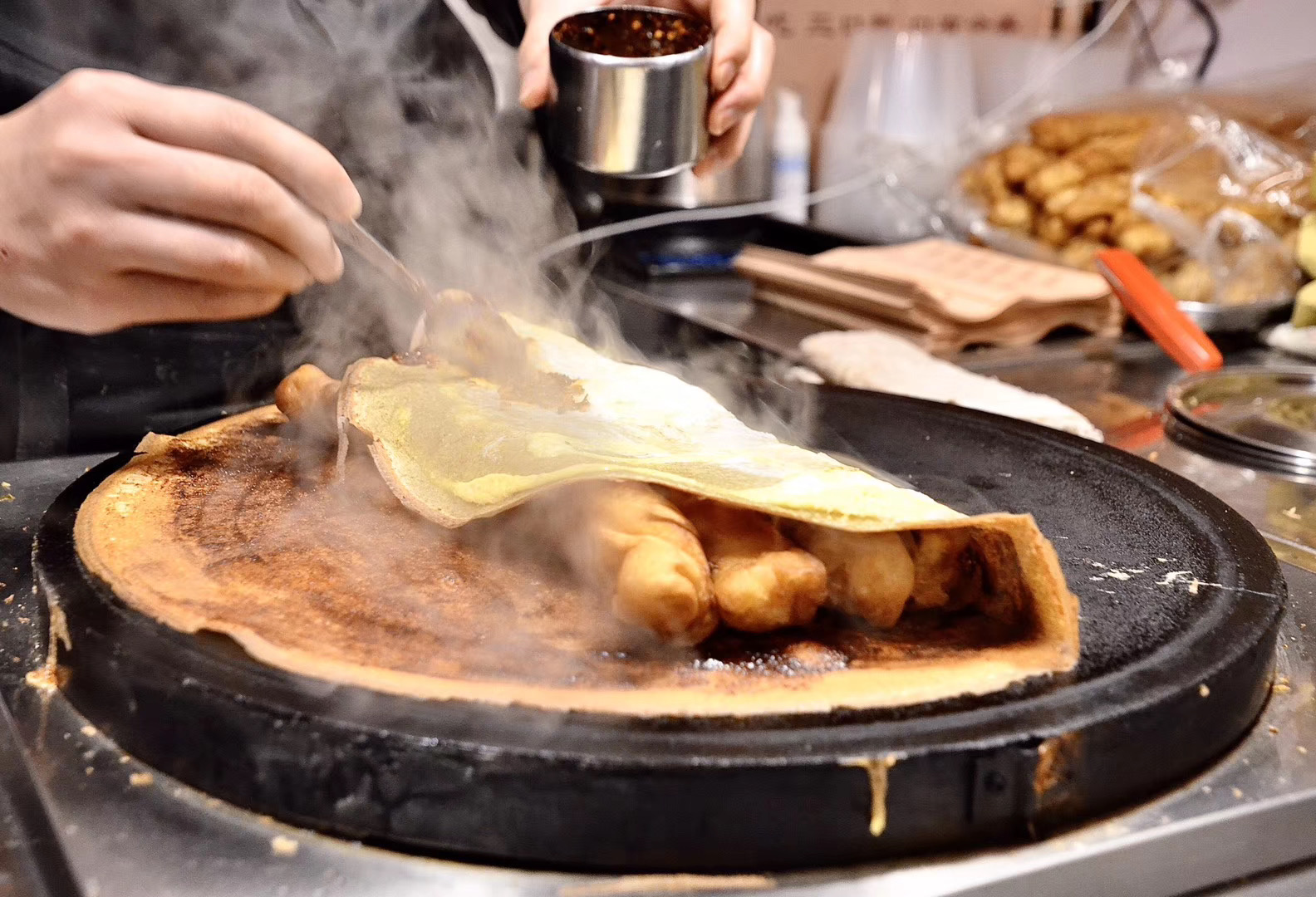
Step 4

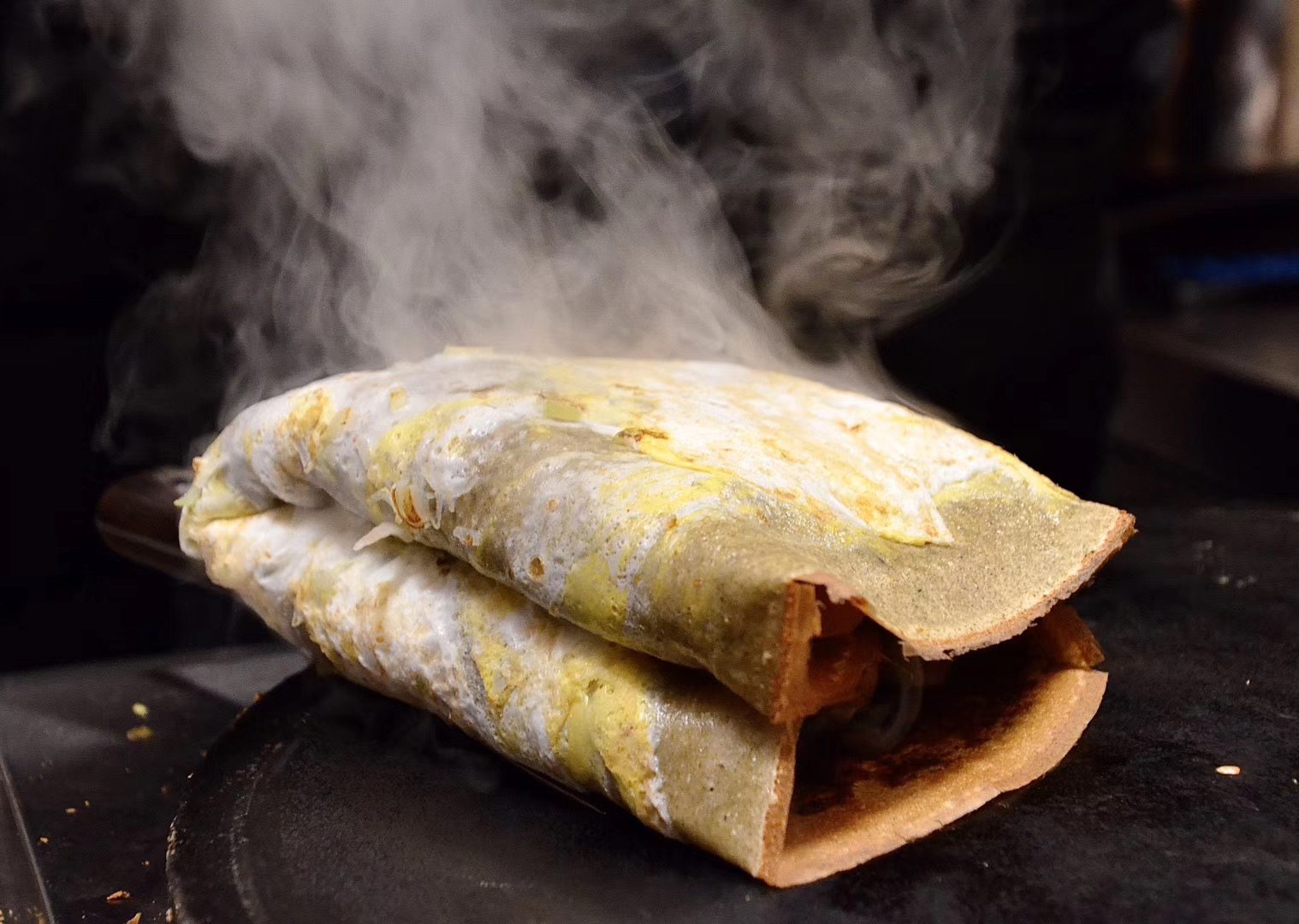
Step 5

== Other varieties ==
=== Shandong-style jianbing guozi ===
Jianbing guozi from Shandong is typically crispier as the batter consists of a flour mixture that mainly contains coarse grains such as corn, sorghum, and millet. Historically, Shandong-style jianbing guozi was often served by rolling it with scallions or with meat soup. It was often called more directly by its form "flatbread wrapped with scallions (大饼卷大葱 da bing juan da cong)" among local people in Shandong. Nowadays, fillings such as sweet potatoes, lettuce and pork are also used.

=== Shanxi-style jianbing guozi ===
Shanxi jianbing guozi uses wheat flour but is otherwise similar to Tianjin jianbing guozi.

=== Tahe-style jianbing guozi ===
Tahe jianbing guozi (from Tahe, Heilongjiang) consists of processed meat, shredded potatoes, and other ingredients wrapped in a thin egg-and-flour pancake. It is slightly spicy and thicker in size.

== Production method ==
Jianbing are made of mung bean flour as the main ingredient and made into a paste. The dough is spread into Jianbing, shaped like lotus leaf, as thin as paper, then rolled with crispy sticks (fried dough sticks) or grates, spread with sauce, fermented bean curd, and chopped green onion, folded from the middle to eat, and can also be served on pancakes. The eggs are spread on top.

The earliest verifiable record about the method of making Tianjin jianbing guozi gizzards comes from the article Gossip about Tianjin published in the third issue of Jinjin Monthly in 1942.

After continuous development, especially the cycle of lack of materials and abundant materials, the raw materials and auxiliary materials of jianbing guozi have evolved to a certain extent.

Technical specification for the production and processing of local traditional famous food in Tianjin, "Tianjin Jianbing guozi," summarizes the main production methods of Tianjin-style jianbing guozi and determines it as a non-binding industry group standard.

== Culture and popularity ==
=== Culture ===
Jianbing guozi are an important role in Tianjin's food culture, and many Tianjin people are quite persistent about its taste tradition. An article was once published sarcastically criticizing the innovation and improvement of pancakes. When buying pancakes in Tianjin, local customers can bring their own eggs and line up according to the order in which the eggs are placed. This has become a custom in Tianjin, which is rare in other cities.

According to rough statistics, there are more than 2,000 jianbing guozi stalls in Tianjin in 2018, with an average daily sales of 150 sets and a total annual output value of not less than 500 million yuan.

In June 2017, the skill of preparing jianbing guozi was selected into the fourth batch of the municipal intangible cultural heritage list in Tianjin. At the 2019 China Tourism Industry Expo, jianbing guozi became one of the most popular snacks. On the occasion of the Summer Davos Forum, jianbing guozi was tasted by the participants as representative of Tianjin cuisine.

In 2018, when Alexandre Pato, a Brazilian soccer player, played for the soccer team Tianjin Tianhai F.C, he appeared in the street stalls of Tianjin to experience pancake dumplings and filmed a music video of Pancake Fruit for Tianjin Catering Association.

In January 2020, when Tianjin dispatched nearly 1,300 medical staff to help Hubei to prevent and control the COVID-19 epidemic, it also sent a team of chefs to make Tianjin special breakfasts such as crispy rice and jianbing guozi for Tianjin medical volunteer team.

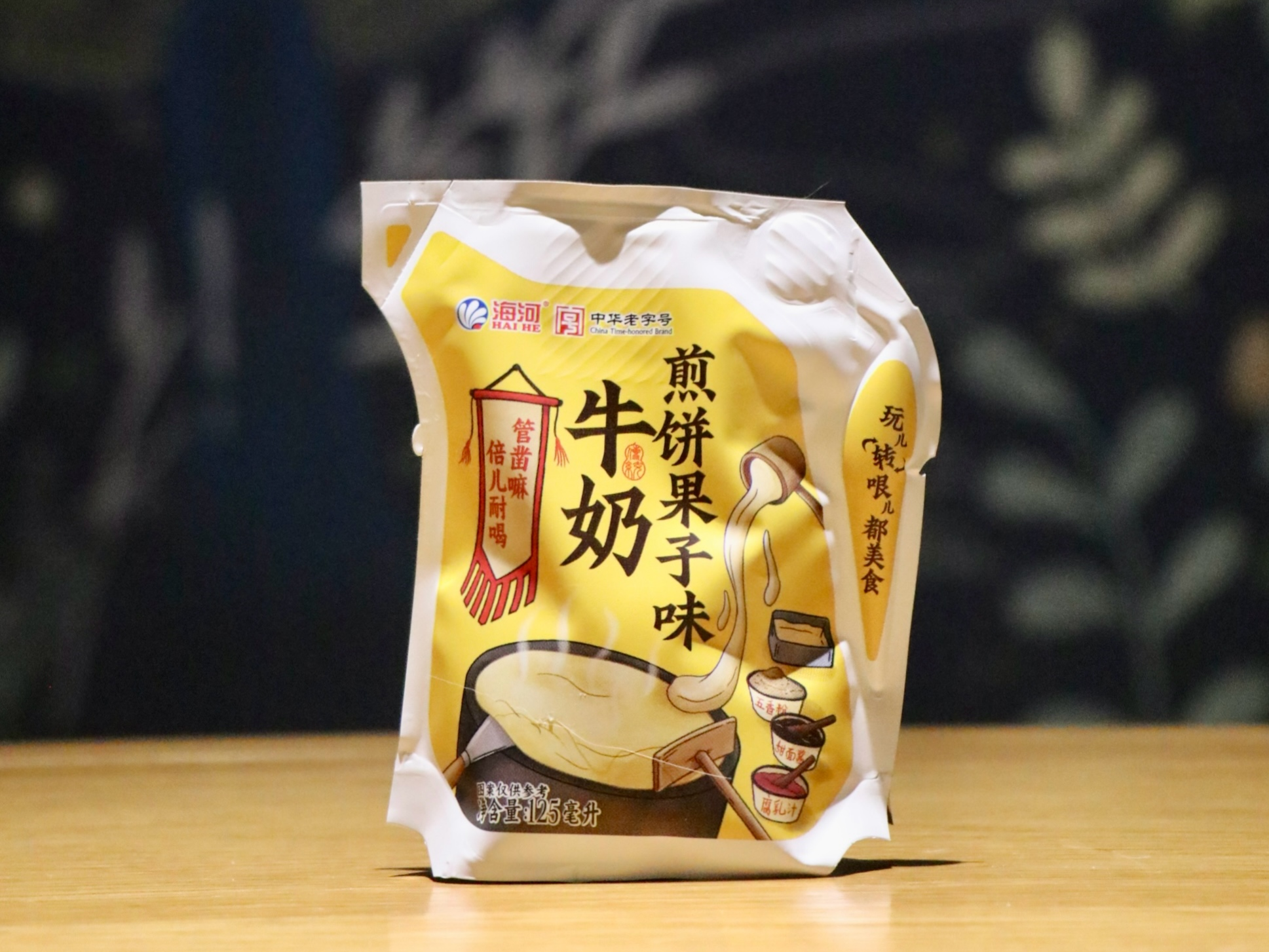
Tianjin-based Haihe Dairy has launched a "jianbing guozi" flavored milk.

In August 2024, Tianjin-based dairy company Haihe Dairy added mung bean flour, millet flour, fermented bean curd juice, soybean paste, and five-spice powder to their milk, launching a jianbing guozi–flavored milk, which quickly became a hit online.

=== Popularity ===
Although all kinds of pancake products are common in many places in China, the traditional jianbing guozi with Tianjin flavor were not popular at first. In the 1980s, Tianjin jianbing guozi became popular in Beijing. Regardless of whether it was done in Tianjin or not, many jianbing vendors liked to put up signs of "Tianjin jianbing guozi" or "authentic Tianjin jianbing". In 2018, the documentary A Bite of China set off a wave of Tianjin pancake enthusiasm.

In recent years, with the gradual increase of Tianjin's overseas immigrants, jianbing guozi has also spread overseas. For example, there was once a chef who ran a restaurant in Hebei District of Tianjin. After retirement, he settled in London, England, and began to create and sell jianbing guozi in London, which became popular among international students from China. Later, Tianjin-style jianbing guozi or improved jianbing guozi gradually became popular, and it was sold by catering operators all over the world. Such as New York City, Los Angeles, Monterey Park, Seattle, Chicago, San Francisco, Canberra, London, Dubai, United Arab Emirates and other places, Tianjin immigrants sell Tianjin specialties including Tianjin-style jianbing guozi.

== Gallery ==
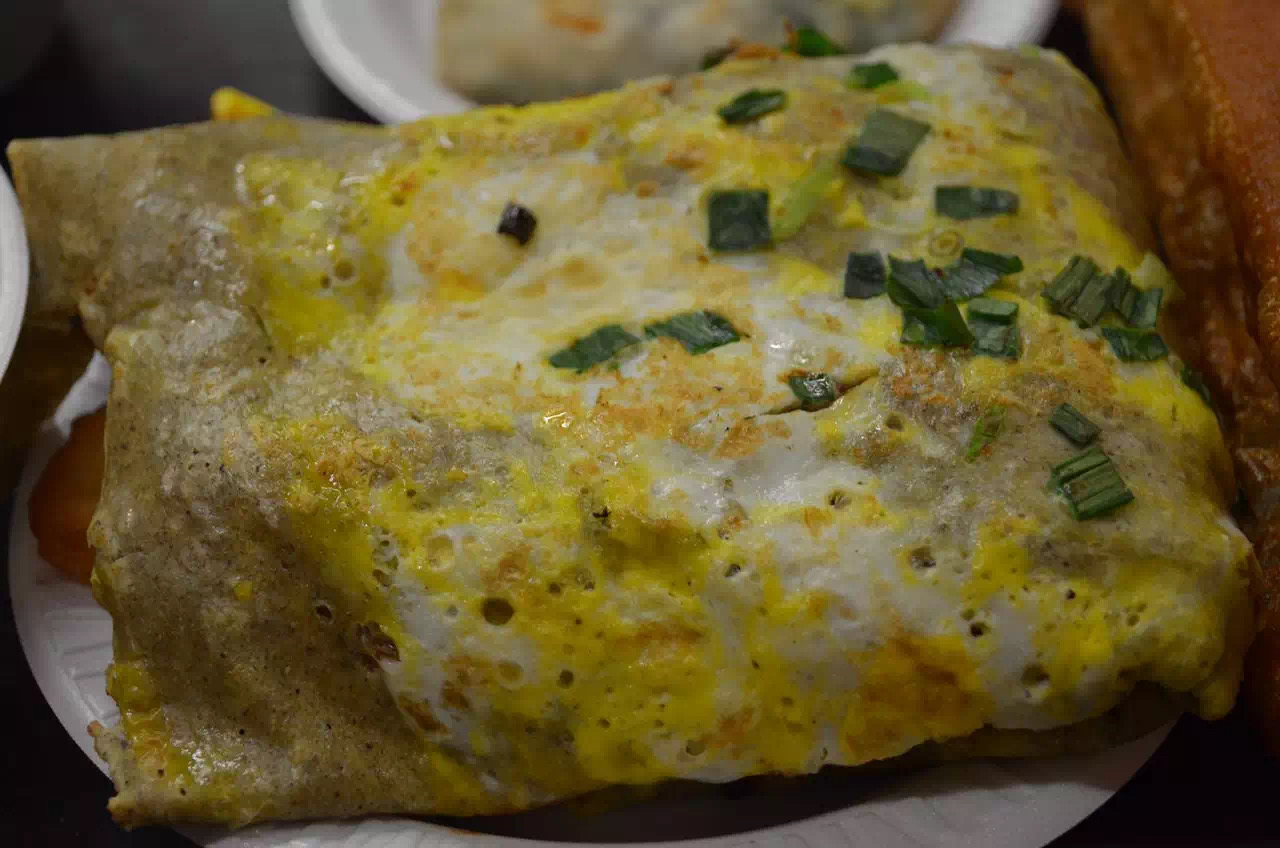
Jianbing guozi in New York City, US

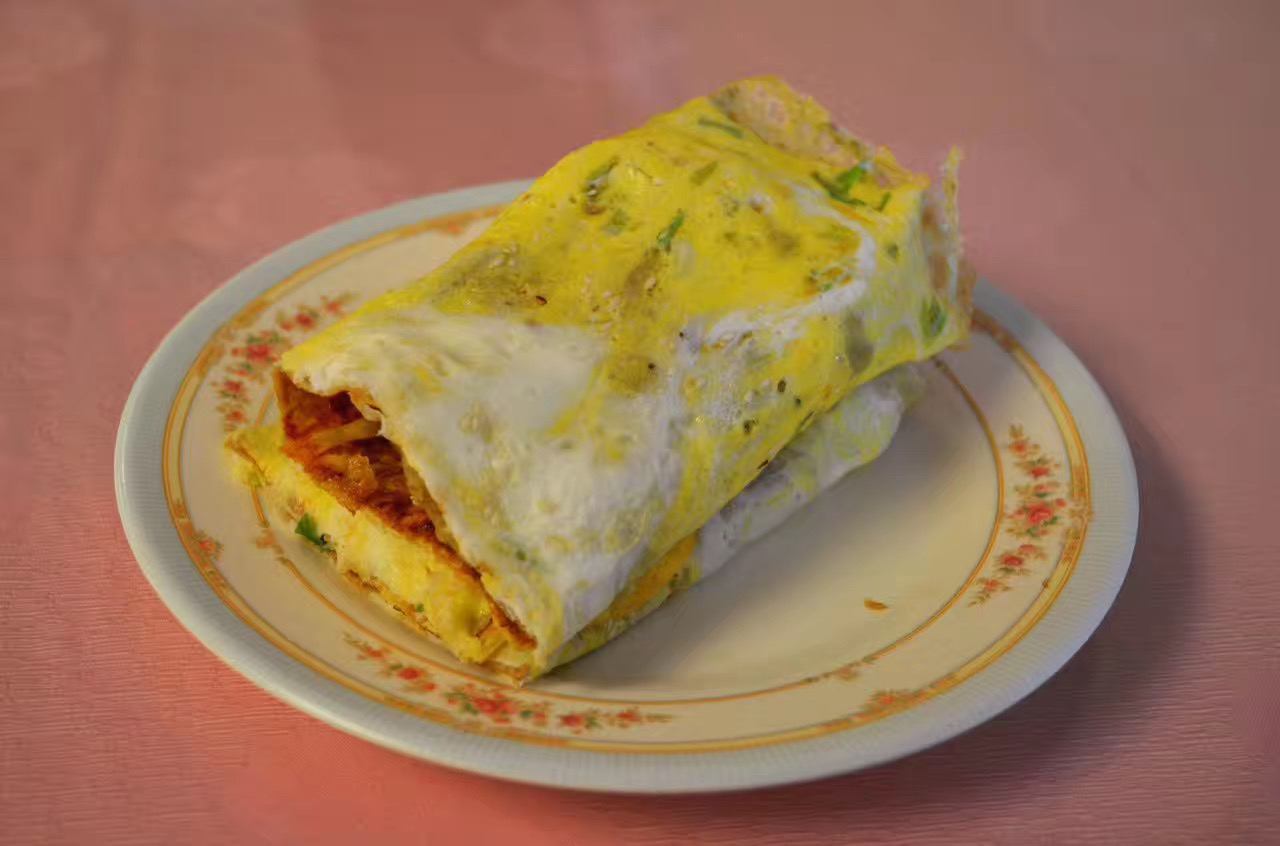
Jianbing guozi in Calgary, Canada

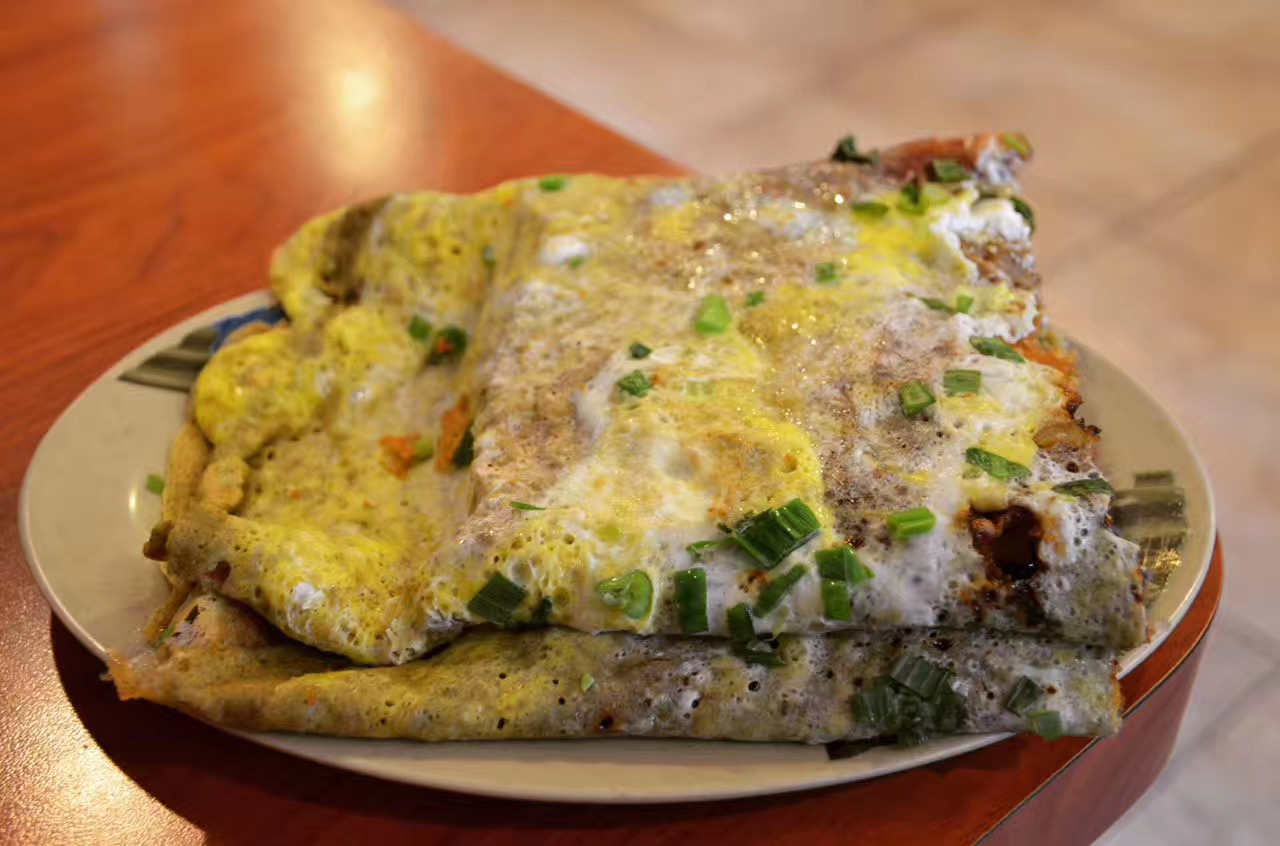
Jianbing guozi in Monterey Park, California, US

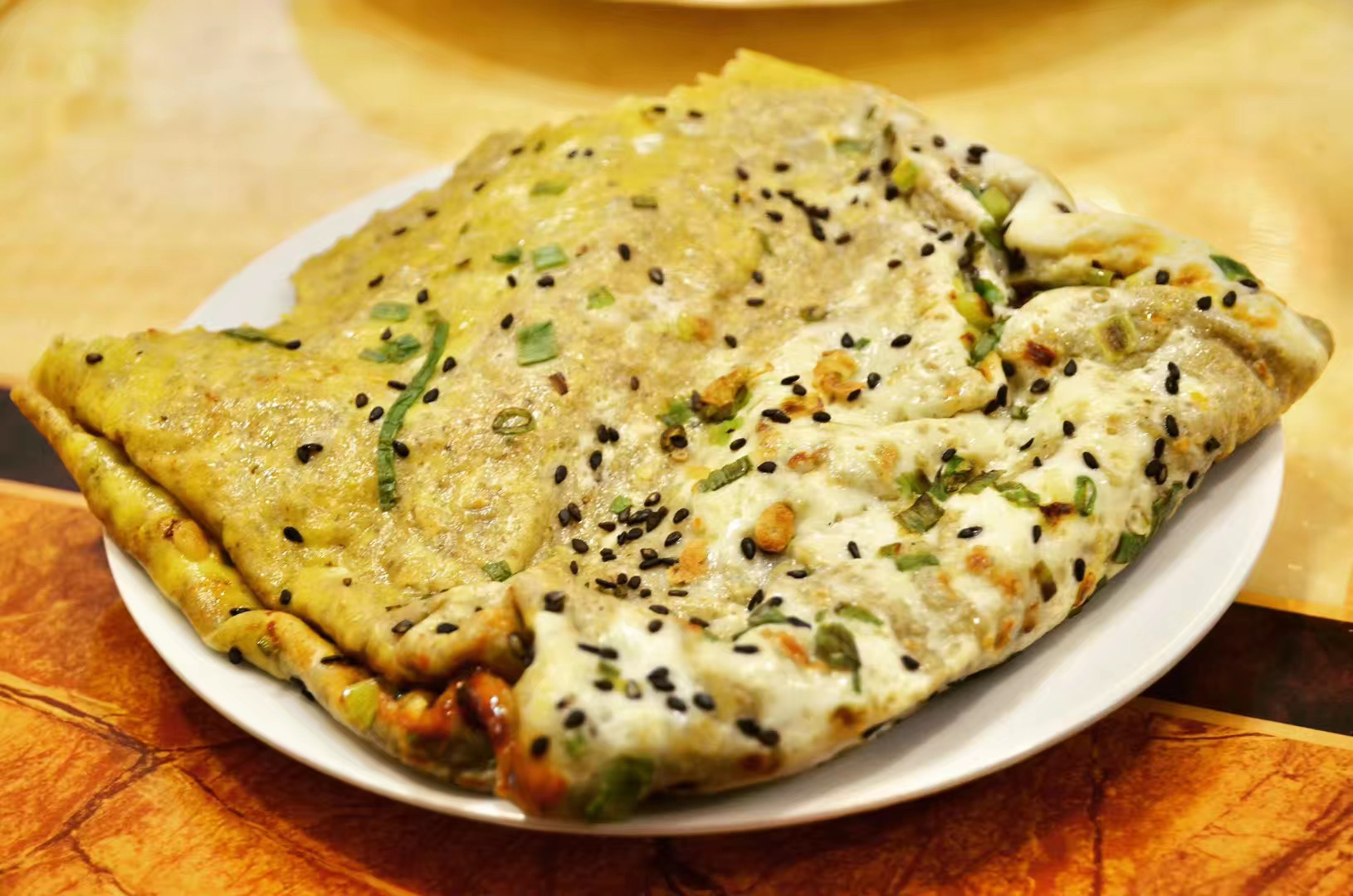
Jianbing guozi in Dubai, UAE

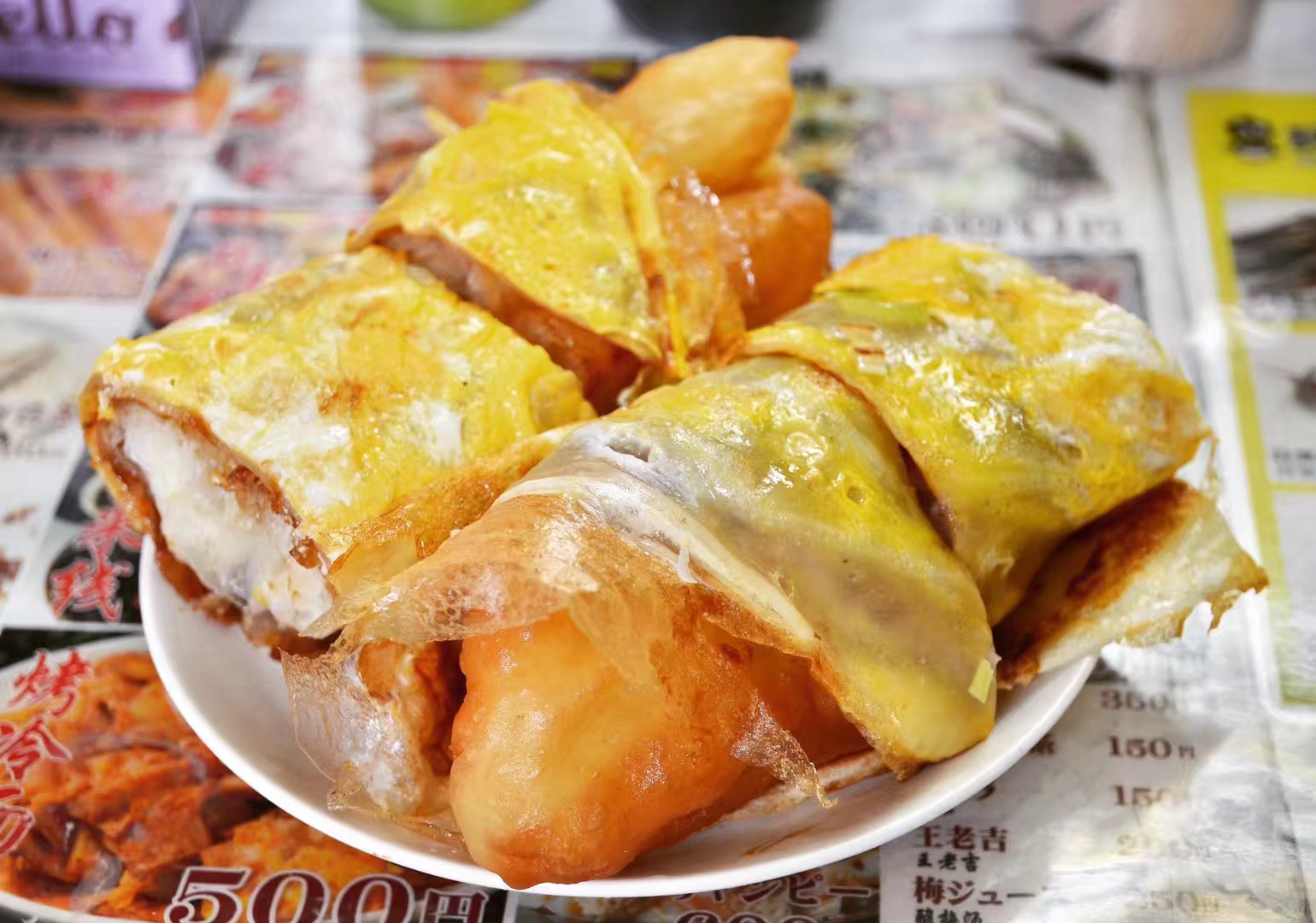
Jianbing guozi in Tokyo, Japan

== Regulations ==
In May 2018, according to the "Tianjin Catering Industry Association Group Standard Management Measures", Tianjin Catering Industry Association approved the "Technical Specifications for the Production and Processing of Tianjin Local Traditional Foods Tianjin Jianbing Guozi". This regulation was implemented from 26 May 2018. This standard specifies the terms and definitions, raw and auxiliary materials requirements, production site and equipment requirements, processing sanitation and personnel requirements, production process requirements, labeling, packaging, transportation and storage, etc. for Tianjin jianbing glutinous rice.

In July 2021, the Tianjin Municipal Bureau of Human Resources and Social Security organized the Pancake Guozi Branch of the Municipal Catering Industry Association to formulate the "Tianjin Pancake Guozi Production Special Occupational Competence Standards" in accordance with the relevant provisions of the "Labor Law of the People's Republic of China" and announced it for implementation. Among them, relevant knowledge, operating norms, specific standards, etc. are given for the powder paste, soy milk, glutinous rice balls, glutinous rice grates, seasonings, and other aspects.

== Dispute ==
The establishment of the standard of jianbing guozi group has aroused concern and debate in Chinese and international media. In January 2018, Hong Kong's South China Morning Post first reported how to make authentic jianbing with industry standard in English. The British Daily Telegraph said that with jianbing guozi becoming a new world food fashion trend, its birthplace is striving to maintain its traditional flavor.

Before the introduction of the standard of jianbing guozi, many details were not clear, and the outside world did not understand that "group standard" was only a recommended standard, so there was a controversy about whether jianbing guozi should formulate a standard. There are supportive voices, and it is claimed that the formulation of standards can promote the healthy development of Tianjin jianbing guozi production and management. However, some media, such as Beijing Daily, think that the charm of Chinese cuisine lies in its non-standardized features, but they also agree that there can be some recommended standards and norms, but they should not be deliberate and rigid.

As to whether the standardized taste of jianbing guozi is still authentic, some commentators mistakenly assume that the group standard is mandatory and hold a negative attitude, and claim that setting the standard will constrain the experience on the tip of the tongue.

There are also some who hold a neutral stance and think that they should be tolerant of the diverse jianbing guozi form, which not only preserves tradition but also insists on innovation. In addition, some commentators presume that the standards formulated by the association are a kind of propaganda means worth learning.

== See also ==
- Jianbing
- List of street foods
