= Goubuli =

Brand of stuffed Chinese bun

Go Believe
- Founded: 1858
- Headquarters: Tianjin, China
- Products: baozi
- Website: www.chinagoubuli.com

Goubuli
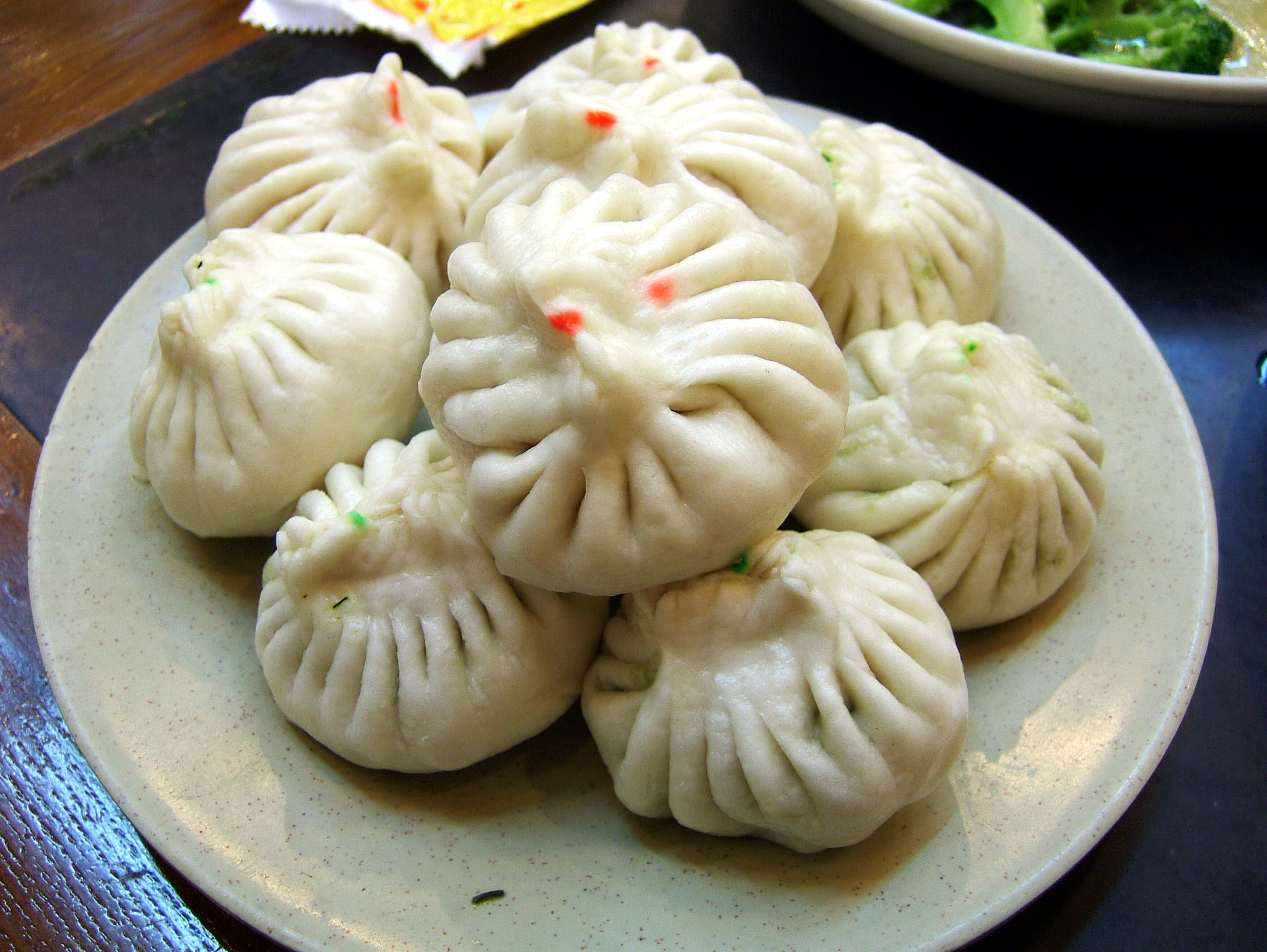
- Goubuli in Tianjin
- Alternative names: dogs don't pay attention/dogs ignore
- Type: baozi
- Place of origin: China
- Region or state: Tianjin

Goubuli
- Chinese: 狗不理
- Literal meaning: dogs don’t pay attention/ignore
Transcriptions
Standard Mandarin
- Hanyu Pinyin: Gǒubùlǐ
- Bopomofo: ㄍㄡˇㄅㄨˋㄌㄧˇ
- Gwoyeu Romatzyh: Gooubuhlii
- Wade–Giles: Kou^{3}pu^{4}li^{3}
- Yale Romanization: Gou^{3}bu^{4}li^{3}
Wu
- Romanization: Keupeqli
Hakka
- Romanization: Gieu`-bud`-li´
- Pha̍k-fa-sṳ: Kiéu-put-lî
Yue: Cantonese
- Yale Romanization: Gáu-bāt-léih
- Jyutping: Gau^{2}-bat^{1}-lei^{5}
- Canton Romanization: Geo^{2}-bed^{1}-léi^{5}
other Yue
- Taishanese: Geu^{2}-but^{2}-lei^{4}
Southern Min
- Hokkien POJ: Káu-put-lí
- Teochew Peng'im: Gao^{2}-bug^{4}-li^{2}
Eastern Min
- Fuzhou BUC: Gēu-bók-lī
Northern Min
- Jian'ou Romanized: Gě-bŭ-lǐ

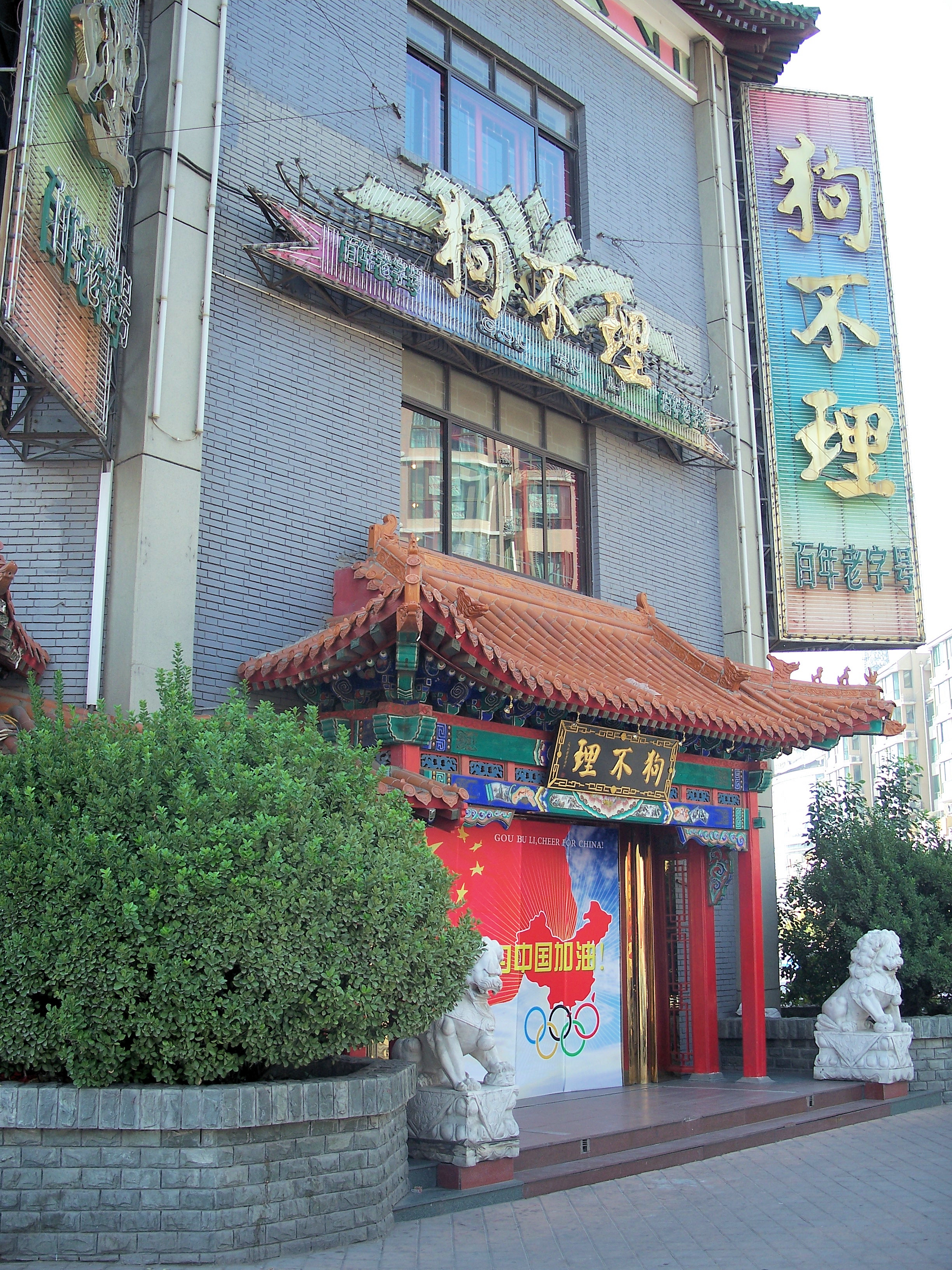
Goubuli in Tianjin

Goubuli, also sometimes transcribed as Go Believe (Chinese: 狗不理; pinyin: Gǒubùlǐ; lit. 'dogs don't pay attention/dogs ignore'), is a brand of stuffed baozi from Tianjin, China. Founded in 1858, it is one of China's longest established brands. Each Goubuli bun has eighteen wrinkles.

== Etymology ==
There are many explanations for the name Goubuli. The oft-quoted one relates to a poor village boy nicknamed Gouzhai. At 14, he became an apprentice at a food store. Thereafter, he set up his own shop specialising in selling steamed, stuffed baozi. His supposedly very delicious baozi soon gained immense popularity in a short period of time. As a result, Gouzhai became too preoccupied with his business to converse with his customers; so they started to complain, "Gouzhai does not talk to people" (which loosely translates as Chinese: 狗不理; pinyin: Gǒubùlǐ).

In another similar story, there was a boy named Gao Guiyou who had a terrible attitude and could ignore people for days if he was angered. Thus, he was named by his mother Goubuli (his nickname "Gou" with "Buli" meaning "ignores"). At 14, Gou was sent by his father to Tianjin where he gained apprenticeship at a food shop and, after mastering his skills, set up his own shop named "Goubuli". Goubuli buns soon become popular with the Tianjin locals.

== English translation ==
In 2008, in anticipation of the 2008 Summer Olympics which were to be held in Beijing, Goubuli decided to adopt an English name, "Go Believe", in hope of better name recognition by foreign guests. However, this was met with heavy criticism by Chinese netizens.

As of 2005, the Goubuli brand is owned by the Chinese pharmaceutical company Tong Ren Tang.

== Controversies ==
=== Recognition ===
Goubuli buns were among the 396 food items awarded the "Famous Chinese Snack" title by the China Cuisine Association in 1997.

=== From dogs ignore to people ignore ===
In September 2020, the historic Goubuli restaurant in Wangfujing, Beijing, turned a mundane negative review into a viral PR disaster by calling the police on the food critic who posted it. This heavy-handed, tone-deaf response to an honest opinion destroyed the brand's reputation overnight:

On September 8, 2020, well-known travel blogger Gu Yue posted a video reviewing Goubuli Baozi Wangfujing branch, the lowest-rated restaurant (2.85 stars) in Beijing's Wangfujing area on Dianping (a Chinese review platform). In the video, he ordered two baskets of baozi (totaling 98 yuan), criticizing the "savory pork buns as extremely greasy" and the "pork buns as having thick skins and little filling," stating bluntly that "this quality is about 20 yuan, 100 yuan for two baskets is a bit expensive."

On September 10, Goubuli Wangfujing branch issued a formal statement accusing the video of "malicious slander" and "infringement of reputation," stating that they had "reported the incident to the police," demanding a public apology from the blogger and pursuing legal action.

In response to the restaurant's threat to "call the police," blogger Gu Yue posted on Weibo on September 11: "I saw the statement from Wangfujing Goubuli this morning, saying that my video infringed on copyright, was not true, and that they had called the police. It really scared me! They won't even let me talk about what I'm eating... I don't want to bother with this. I hope they can make better and more affordable steamed buns."

At the end of March 2021, Goubuli's store at No. 31 Dashilan Street, Beijing closed its doors to customers. This store was Goubuli's last directly-operated store in Beijing, which immediately caused people to debate the taste and reputation of Tianjin's time-honored brands, and it was once on Weibo's hot search list on March 29.

== Gallery ==
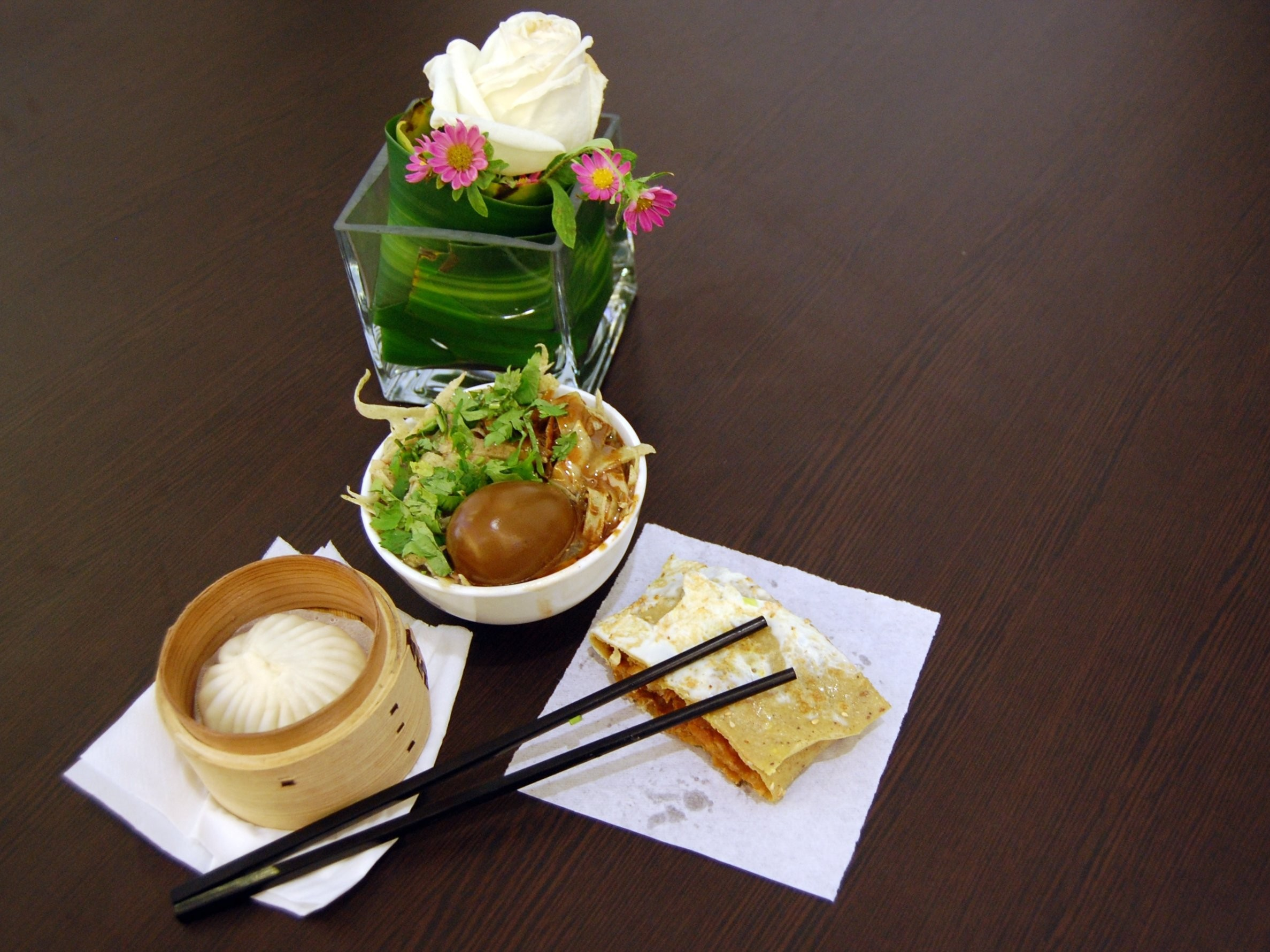
A traditional Tianjin lunch of Goubuli Baozi

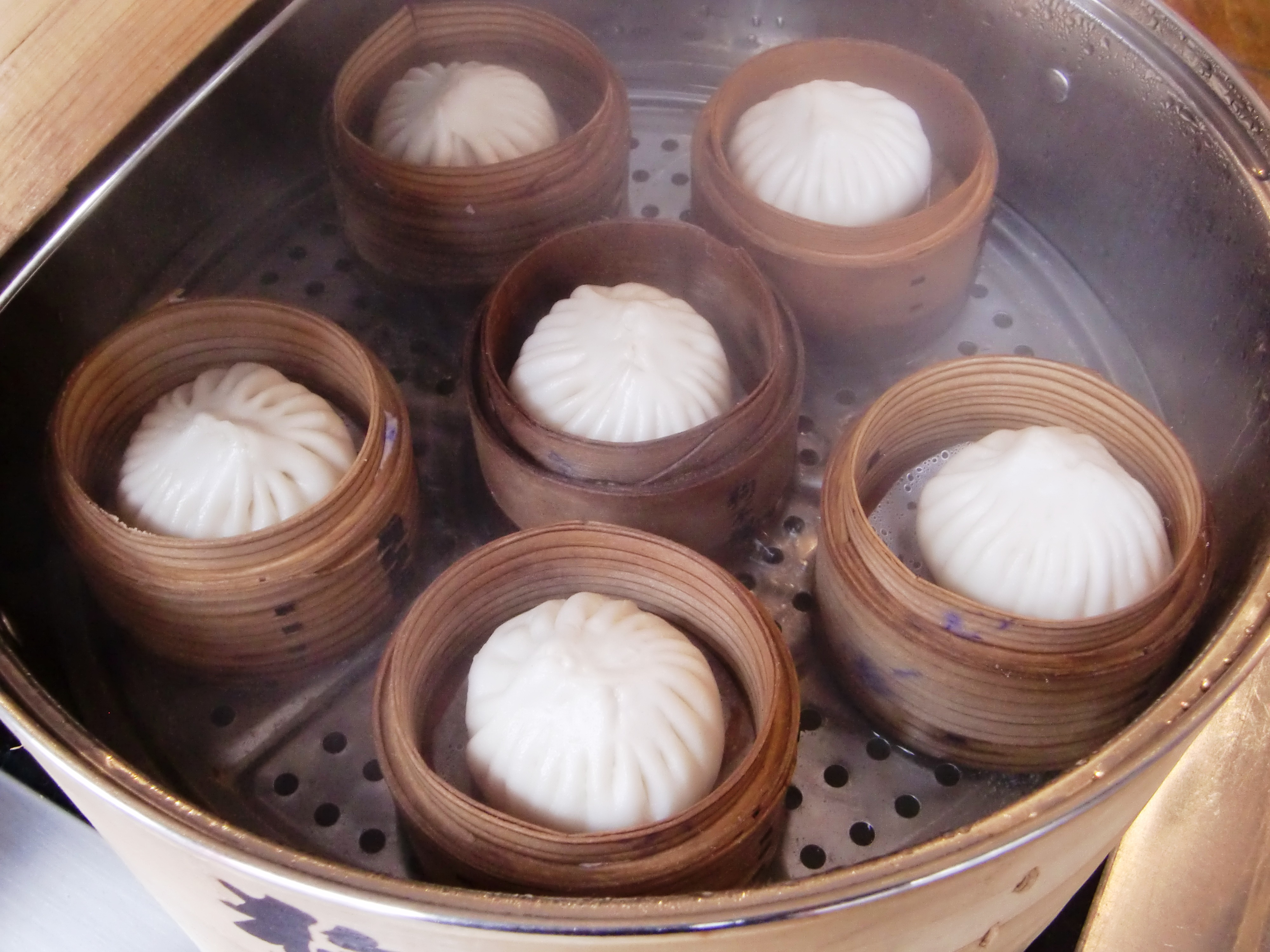
Goubuli buns being cooked

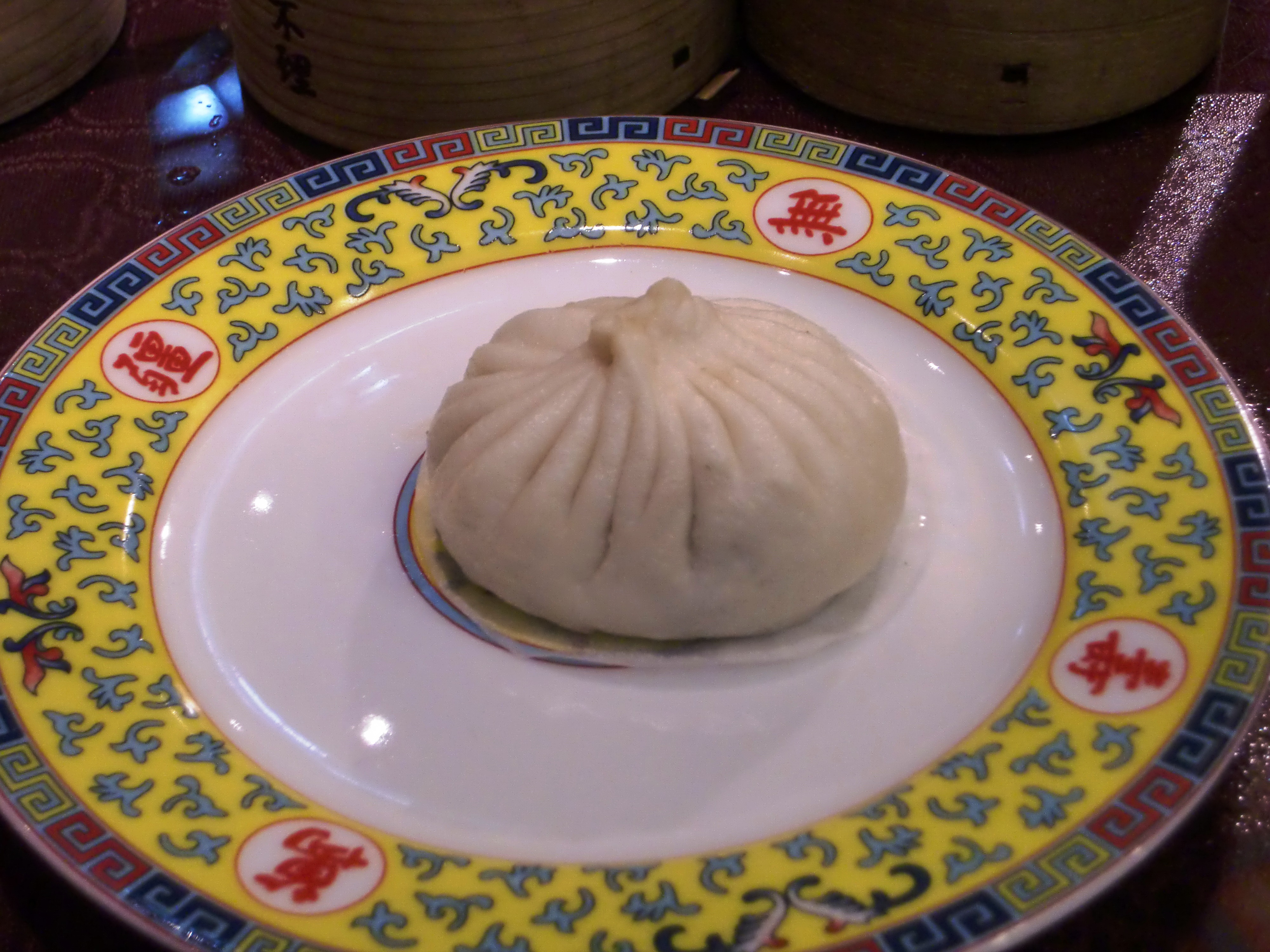
Goubuli bun, ready to eat

== See also ==
- List of snack foods
- List of steamed foods
