= Yulong Ski Resort =

Ski resort in Tianjin, China

Coordinates: 40.1103°N 117.3822°E

Yulong Ski Resort (Chinese: 玉龙滑雪场) is a substantial ski facility situated in Tianjin, China, seven kilometers north of Jizhou, Tianjin, and east of Jinwei Highway.

== Geography ==
Tianjin Jibei Yulong Ski Resort is a substantial mountain ski resort that is a part of Tianjin Huangyaguan Great Wall Tourism Co., Ltd. It is situated 7 kilometers north of Jizhou, Tianjin, east of Jinwei Highway. The ski resort is situated 115 kilometers from Tianjin and 90 kilometers from Beijing, and it is surrounded by scenic locations. It is enveloped by a variety of scenic destinations and landmarks, such as the Mount Pan in the west, Baxian Mountain, Jiulong Mountain, and Eastern Qing tombs in the east, Yuyang Ancient City in the south, and Huangyaguan Great Wall in the north. The ski facility spans a total area of 130,000 square meters.
