= Jingji Villa =

- 静寄山庄遗址 (Chinese)
- Type: Archaeological site
- Location: Lianhe Village, Guanzhuang Town, Jixian, Tianjin, China

History
- Built: Qing dynasty

Designations
- Designation: Provincial Cultural Relic, January 5, 2013

Jingji Villa (Chinese: 静寄山庄), also known as the Panshan Palace (盘山行宫), is located in Lianhe Village, Guanzhuang Town, Jixian District, Tianjin, at the southeastern foot of Mount Pan. It was the second-largest royal palace outside Beijing during the Qing dynasty, following the Chengde Mountain Resort.

== History ==
In the ninth year of the Qianlong Emperor's reign during the Qing dynasty (1744), construction of the jingji Villa began at the emperor's order on the southeastern slopes of Mount Pan in Guanzhuang Town, Jixian District, Tianjin. The villa was completed in the 19th year of Qianlong's reign (1754). According to the late Qing official Fu zengxiang, the villa's layout was partially modeled after the Chengde Mountain Resort and enclosed by a wall measuring over seven and a half kilometers. The jingji Villa covered over 6,000 mu (approximately 1,000 acres) and featured 38 scenic spots, categorized into the "Inner Eight Scenes," "Outer Eight Scenes," "Newly Added Six Scenes," and "Sixteen Supplemental Scenes." It was the third-largest imperial garden constructed during the Qing dynasty, following the Chengde Mountain Resort and the Old Summer Palace.

The villa was managed by the "Panshan Governor," an official at the fifth rank under the Imperial Household Department. Responsibilities included maintaining and safeguarding the villa as well as managing nearby imperial facilities such as the yan jiao, Baijian, Peach Blossom Temple , Longfu Temple, Daxinzhuang Palace , and Shengjishan Palace. The villa was a frequent retreat for Qing emperors, with the Qianlong Emperor visiting 32 times and the Jiaqing Emperor visiting seven times. However, after 1810, no further imperial visits occurred. In 1831, during the Daoguang Emperor's reign, the Panshan Imperial Palace was officially abolished, and its furnishings were relocated to the Chengde Mountain Resort.

In 1926, jingji Villa suffered significant destruction during the warlord era when troops under Hu Jingyi dismantled its structures to fund military expenses. Remaining structures were looted or sold over the years, leaving only ruins. In the early 21st century, parts of the original villa site were incorporated into the Shiqu Garden Scenic Area.

In 2012, the Jixian Tourism Bureau proposed a restoration project to rebuild the villa's "Inner Eight Scenes" at a cost of 3 billion RMB. The plan included preserving historical authenticity while adding modern service facilities.

The Panshan area once hosted numerous temples. According to Zhipu's *Panshan Chronicle*, it was home to 22 temples, 2 courtyards, 29 hermitages, 10 meditation rooms, 9 shrines, 5 terraces, 5 bridges, 1 fort, 4 pavilions, 2 study rooms, 3 pagodas, and over 100 stupas. Many of these structures were destroyed during the 20th century due to wars and other factors. Surviving landmarks, such as the Tiancheng Temple Relic Pagoda and the Dingguang Buddha Pagoda, have been designated as Tianjin Cultural Relics Protection Units. In recent years, the development of Panshan tourism has led to the reconstruction of some temples, including Tiancheng Temple, Wansong Temple, and Yunzhao Temple.

== Building ==
The terrain of Jingji Villa is low in the south and high in the north, and the surrounding walls are built with tiger skin stones. There is a mountain stream in the east and west of the villa, with a slope in the middle. The water of the two streams converges at the southern end of the villa. There are gullies in the north of the villa, and the terrain is gentle in the south. There is a small hill in the far north, which is called "Shifo Mountain" by the locals. The villa is divided into two parts: the palace and the garden.

After the villa was built, Emperor Qianlong determined the inner and outer eight scenes. The inner eight scenes are located in the villa. The outer eight scenes are the scenes of Panshan outside the villa. They are collectively called "Sixteen Scenes of Imperial Titles". Later, six more scenes were added.

The inner eight scenes: Jingji Villa, Taigu Yunlan, Layered Rocks Flying Green, Qingxu Yuyu, All Sounds of Pine Blowing, Mirror Round and Always Shining, Four-sided Hibiscus, Zhenguan Relics.

The outer eight scenes: Tiancheng Temple, Wansong Temple, Wujiantai, Pangu Temple, Yunzhao Temple, Zigai Peak, Qianxiang Temple, Fushifang.

Six new scenic spots have been added: Bantian Tower, Chishangju, Nonglexuan, Yuhua Room, Lingran Pavilion and Xiaoputuo.

=== The palace part ===
Includes four groups of buildings, Jingji Villa, Taigu Yunlan, Shouxuan Hall, and Cengyan Feicui, each with a palace wall. Locals call them the front palace (Jingji Villa), the middle palace (Taigu Yunlan, Shouxuan Hall), and the back palace (Cengyan Feicui).

- Jingji Villa: It is the general name of the entire palace and one of the eight scenic spots. It is located at the south end of the villa. The main building is on the same central axis as the Grand Palace Gate, the main entrance of the entire villa. The inscription on the main building is "Zhiren Le Yu", which is where Emperor Qianlong listened to politics in the villa. The main building is seven rooms wide, with a curved roof and a hip roof. There are corridors around it connecting the ancillary buildings to form a quadrangle. There is a "Songyan Hancui" room in the east, where the ministers were feasted. Further east is the "Jinglan Pavilion", located on the bank of the stream, with a bridge on the stream, and a mountain road to the east and north of the bridge. The scope of Jingji Villa includes the Great Palace Gate, Songyan Hancui, and Jinglan Pavilion, all of which were located in the Tianjin Public Utilities Bureau Sanatorium (Qiyuan) in the early 21st century. There is also a small palace gate to the east of Jianshui, which is a convenient gate for garden officials and servants to enter and exit. It was occupied by the Tianjin Finance and Taxation Sanatorium in the early 21st century.
- Taigu Yunlan: Located on a small hill to the north and east of Jingji Villa, it is one of the eight inner scenes. The "Qinding Panshan Zhi" records: "The mountain pepper is picked up to the extreme, the land is open and far-reaching, and it is a dome and pavilion." The main building is two-story, five rooms wide, and has a curved roof. The imperial title is "Taikoo Yunlan", which means that the quiet is like the ancient times. From here, the view is "like a huge sea of glass, shining on everything." To the west of the main building are Yinshengxuan, Changyuanzhai, and Jieyaolou. To the north is Yunsonggan. Taigu Yunlan is the largest building complex in the villa, consisting of multiple courtyards with corridors between buildings. In the early 21st century, it was inhabited by farmers, and the original palace walls and building foundations still remain.
- Shouxuan Hall: Located to the east of Taigu Yunlan, it is in a lower terrain and is the resting place of the empress dowager. It is an independent courtyard, and there is a corridor between Heyun Songxuan for the emperor to come here to ask questions in the morning and evening. The layout is front hall and back bedroom. The front hall is a quadrangle style, both are curved shed buildings, and the bedroom is "goulianda". In the early 21st century, it was inhabited by farmers, and the original column bases and building foundations still remain.
- Layered Rocks and Flying Green: Located to the east of Taigu Yunlan and the southeast foot of Shifoshan, it is one of the eight inner scenes. The main building is Danhuai Hall, with a memorial archway and a hall in front, as well as east and west auxiliary rooms, forming a quadrangle. There are also east and west cross courtyards. The west cross courtyard has Xiecui Tower and Yunqi Pavilion. The east cross courtyard is small in area, and there is a stone path outside the north wall, leading to Lvju Pavilion and Shilin Jingshe.

=== Garden view part ===
The garden scenery is divided into three areas: East Stream, West Stream and Mountain Area.

Dongjian District: The eastern part of the villa is traversed by a large mountain stream. There are scenes such as Simian Yunshan, Jiwang Chengxian, Linshen Shirun, Qingxu Yuyu, Xiaoputuo, Chishangju, and Nong Lexuan.

- Simian Yunshan: Located in the northeast corner of the villa, it is close to Qianxiang Temple. It is not included in the "Qinding Panshan Zhi", but it is included in the "Panshan Tu" painted during the Tongzhi period, so this place was expanded after the 19th year of Qianlong. At the beginning of the 21st century, there was still a tall platform and stacked stones.
- Jiwang Chengxian: A pavilion located in a high and open place in the northeast of the villa, called "Jiwang Chengxian". The building foundation was no longer visible at the beginning of the 21st century.
- Xiaoputuo: Located in the Xigang Jiagu near the north wall of the villa, it is one of the six newly added scenes. The water flows into a pool here, and there were originally many bamboos by the pool. There is a square pavilion with double eaves and pointed roofs in the northeast of the pool, with carved wood as the wall. Guanyin is enshrined in the pavilion, and the pool water is regarded as the Luojia Sea, so this place is called "Xiaoputuo". At the beginning of the 21st century, only the imperial poem of Emperor Jiaqing engraved on a huge stone remained.
- Lin Shen Shi Run: Located to the east of Xiao Putuo, it is called "Huo Dao" by locals. At the beginning of the 21st century, there are still rockeries made of granite. The remaining building foundations should be the site of the Reading Painting Building. There are also cobblestone roads. There is a huge stone in front of the rockery, one of which is engraved with "Lin Shen Shi Run", and the other three sides have the imperial poem of Emperor Qianlong.
- Qingxu Yuyu: Located in the southwest of Xiao Putuo, on a high hill in the northeast of Chengyan Feicui, it is one of the eight inner scenes and a Taoist building. Locals call it "Yuhuang Pavilion". The main building is a circular pavilion with corridors around it. There is a hall in the south, and auxiliary rooms on the east and west sides. The plane is square outside and round inside. The terrain here is high, and you can overlook Chengyan Feicui. The building foundations still exist in the early 21st century.
- Chishangju: Located on the west bank of Dongjian and northeast of Taigu Yunlan, it is one of the six newly added scenes. At the entrance from Taigu Yunlan to Chishangju, there are two cliffs facing each other, with a brick and stone gatehouse in the middle, called "Piyunzhan", also known as "Kuanyanfei". Entering the door is Chishangju. The center of Chishangju is the pool, with the north house and the west auxiliary house. There are three pools from north to south, arranged in a stepped manner. The northernmost pool is round, and the other two pools are half-moon shaped. There were many stacked stones beside the pool, but many of them were demolished when the Panshan Reservoir was built in 1975. There is Hanbi Pavilion to the east of the pool, and Qinxia Pavilion behind the north house. The building foundation still exists at the beginning of the 21st century, and the pool is filled with mud and sand.
- Nong Le Xuan: Located south of Shouxuan Hall and on the west bank of Dongjian, it is one of the six newly added scenic spots. Here, a house is built on the north side of the flat land, called "Nong Le Xuan", and a pavilion is built on the south side, called "Nan Xuan", which is where the emperor persuaded farmers. Column bases and building foundations still exist at the beginning of the 21st century.

Xijian District: Xijian, known as "Nanjian" by locals, is the most prosperous of all the streams in Panshan. From north to south, there are the Zhenguan Relics, Songs of Songs, Little Stone City, Wanluan Thatched Cottage, and Four-sided Hibiscus.

- The Remains of Zhenguan and Thousand-foot Snow: Located at the bottom of the stream northwest of the villa. Legend has it that when Emperor Taizong of Tang passed by during his eastern expedition, he hung his armor on a huge rock, so the stone was called "Laijia Stone". Emperor Qianlong inscribed the four characters "Remains of Zhenguan" on the east cliff, which is one of the eight inner scenes. The water from various mountains converges to the bottom of the stream, and the water hits the rocks like jumping beads. Emperor Qianlong compared this place to the thousand-foot snow on Hanshan Mountain, and wrote the three characters "Thousand-foot Snow" on the cliff. There are also many poems written by Emperor Qianlong on the stone next to the big characters. There is a small house with a width of three rooms on the west bank. In front of the small house, there is a long corridor leading to a waterside pavilion in the water and rocks, where you can enjoy the thousand-foot snow. At the beginning of the 21st century, the foundations of the buildings here have disappeared, and only cliff carvings remain.
- Xiaoshicheng: Located on the high hill of Jianxiyan, it is a large piece of superimposed boulders, covering an area of nearly 10,000 square meters, and is called "Stone Sea" by locals. A huge stone at the edge of the stream is engraved with Emperor Qianlong's poem Xiaoshicheng. There is a pavilion in front of the boulder, and the foundation still exists in the early 21st century. In the early 21st century, Xiaoshicheng was located in the Martyrs Cemetery and the Veterans Sanatorium.
- Zhongyin Songchui, Wanluan Thatched Cottage: Located in the east of Jian. The main building is Wanluan Thatched Cottage, which was built in imitation of Dong Qichang's painting "Wanluan Thatched Cottage". Here, the sound of pine trees and the sound of water are in harmony. Zhongyin Songchui is one of the eight inner scenes. In the nearby lush forests, there are Cuishi Pavilion, Qingxiao Pavilion, Songturbulent Flowing Rhythm and other scenes. South of Zhongyin Songchui and in the northwest corner outside the Taigu Yunlan Wall, there are three circular pools, which the locals call "Glass Lake", as well as large building foundations and stacked stones.
- Four-sided Hibiscus: Located on a small high ground southwest of Taigu Yunlan and north of Jingji Villa, it is one of the eight inner scenes. It is a pavilion, imitating Li Bai's Kuanglu. In the early 21st century, the building foundation no longer exists because of mountain excavation and sand mining.

Mountain area: namely the scenic spots of Shifo Mountain, including the Stone Buddha Hall, Duoshan Pavilion, Yancui Pavilion, Moqing Pavilion, Danyun Pavilion, Bantian Tower, Lingran Pavilion, Jingyuan Changzhao, Yuhua Room, Yunlin Stone Room and other scenery.

- Stone Buddha Hall: Located on the southern slope of the mountain, there are three stone Buddha statues in the hall, which are the Three Saints of the West. The main statue of Amitabha in the middle is 24 feet tall and has a beard; the Bodhisattva statues on both sides are 18 feet tall and were carved according to the painting of Zhang Sengyou by Emperor Qianlong. The Stone Buddha Hall was destroyed in the 16th year of the Republic of China (1927). One Buddha statue was destroyed during the construction of Panshan Reservoir in the late 1970s. The other two Buddha statues were moved to Yushizhuang in the early 1990s and later became the main statues in Wanfo Temple. At the beginning of the 21st century, the Stone Buddha Hall still had the foundation of the building and the stone inscription "The face is the real mountain" by Emperor Qianlong.
- Duoshan Pavilion: Located under the Stone Buddha Hall, the foundation still existed at the beginning of the 21st century. There is a huge stone behind the pavilion, engraved with the imperial poem of Duoshan Pavilion.
- Yuncui Pavilion: Located to the east of the Stone Buddha Hall. There is a stone inscribed with the imperial title "Zhuoyanfei" nearby. At the beginning of the 21st century, the above buildings and stone inscriptions were gone.
- Mirror Round and Always Reflecting: Located below Duoshan Pavilion, west of Layered Rocks and Flying Green, it is one of the eight inner scenes. Legend has it that this place was originally the "Ganhua Temple", which was rebuilt into the "Zhu Zhaoti Temple" when the villa was built. Bricks and tiles from the Liao Dynasty were found in the ruins of this building.
- Bantian Tower: Located on the flat area at the west foot of the mountain, it is one of the six newly added scenes. There are two floors on the high platform, with a width of five rooms and a hip roof. Emperor Qianlong once wrote many poems here. At the beginning of the 21st century, the building foundation still exists.
- Yun Pavilion: Located to the east of the peak of the mountain, the plane is octagonal. At the beginning of the 21st century, the building foundation still exists.
- Moqing Pavilion: Located to the northeast of Bantian Tower, it is still in the early 21st century. Looking north from here, you can see a huge stone with the two characters "Luoping" inscribed by Emperor Qianlong on the hillside outside the villa, each character is 4.5 meters high.
- Lingran Pavilion: Located in the east valley of the mountain, it is one of the six newly added scenes. It is a small quadrangle-style building complex, facing east and sitting west. There is a huge stone in the courtyard that looks like a palm, with the words "Xian Zhang" inscribed on it. The stone next to it is engraved with the poem written by Emperor Qianlong. At the beginning of the 21st century, the building foundation and the courtyard wall still exist, and the "Xian Zhang" stone has been destroyed by the quarrying.
- Yuhua Room: Located in the northeast of Lingran Pavilion, it is one of the six newly added scenes. It is a quadrangle with red plums outside. Emperor Qianlong praised the red plums here as better than the imperial garden. At the beginning of the 21st century, the building foundation still exists.
- Yunlin Stone Chamber: Located in the northwest of Yuhua Room, it is a natural stone chamber formed by a huge stone. There are four words "Yunlin Stone Chamber" inscribed on the stone. At the beginning of the 21st century, the stone chamber and the inscription have been destroyed by the quarrying.
