= Yuqiao Reservoir =

Chinese reservoir

- Location within Tianjin
- Location: Yuqiao Village; Jizhou District, Tianjin
- Coordinates: 40°01′54″N 117°26′30″E
- Type: reservoir
- Catchment area: 2,060 km^{2} (800 sq mi)
- Basin countries: China
- Max. length: 35 km (20 mi)
- Max. width: 6 km (4 mi)
- Surface area: 135 km^{2} (50 sq mi)
- Average depth: 4.74 m (20 ft)
- Max. depth: 12.16 m (40 ft)
- Water volume: 155,900,000 m^{3} (6×10^{9} cu ft)

Yuqiao Reservoir is a large reservoir in Jizhou District, Tianjin. It was built for water supply to the downtown of Tianjin as well as for flood control purposes. The reservoir is also known as Cuiping Lake, and it is a part of the Luan River-Tianjin water transfer project.
