= Michael Booth =

Michael Booth may refer to:

- Michael Booth (writer)
- Michael Booth (cricketer)
- Michael Booth (gymnast)
- Michael Booth (runner)
- Mike Booth, American video game designer
