= Panshan =

Panshan may refer to:

- Mount Pan, mountain in Ji County, Tianjin, China
- Panshan County, in Liaoning, China
