= Dule Temple =

Buddhist temple in Tianjin, China

- 独乐寺
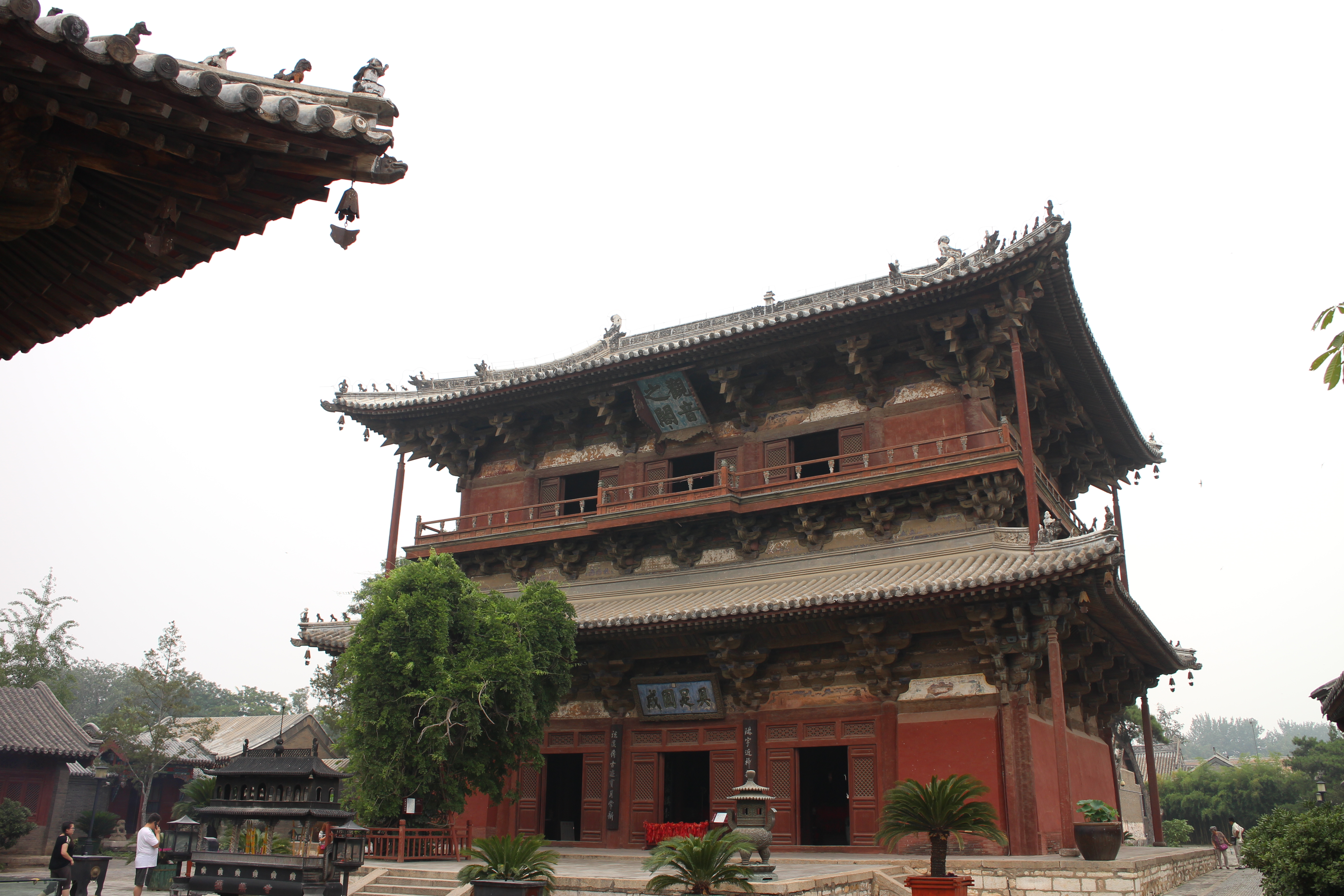
- Guanyin Pavilion at Dule Temple

- Location within Tianjin

Religion
- Affiliation: Buddhism
- Sect: Chan Buddhism
- Deity: Guanyin

Location
- Location: Jizhou, Tianjin, China
- Coordinates: 40°02′39″N 117°23′48″E

Architecture
- Style: Chinese architecture
- Established: 984

The Dule Temple (traditional Chinese: 獨樂寺; simplified Chinese: 独乐寺; pinyin: Dúlè Sì; lit. 'Temple of Solitary Joy') is a Buddhist temple located in Jizhou District of suburban Tianjin, China. The temple is of historical as well as architectural significance. Its oldest surviving buildings are two timber-frame structures, the front gate and the central hall (pavilion) that houses a colossal clay statue of Shiyimian Guanyin, the eleven-headed manifestation of the Bodhisattva Guanyin (Avalokiteśvara). Both structures date back to the Liao dynasty and are among the oldest surviving wooden buildings in China. It was added in 1961 to the National Priority Protected site list as part of the 1st Batch of National Priority Protected Sites.

== History ==
The origins of the Dule Temple date back at least to the early Tang dynasty. However, no buildings from the Tang dynasty era have survived on the site. In which year the Dule Temple was built is unknown. According to Liang Sicheng's research published in 1932, since the gate is the oldest part of the temple, and the form of the gate is similar to the form of the Tang Dynasty buildings recorded in Dunhuang murals, it is reasonable to deduce that the gate and the Guanyin Pavilion should be built in the Sui and Tang dynasties. The oldest buildings still in existence, the shanmen and the Guanyin Pavilion, were rebuilt during a renovation of the temple in the second year of Tonghe Emperor of the Liao dynasty (984 AD). These buildings, both central features of the temple, were designed and constructed by local architects and craftsmen on the basis of the Tang architectural technology and carving techniques. According to another important research, by comparing different sizes for every component of the Guanyin Pavilion and the gate, we can further confirm the date of construction of the building.

In 755, An Lushan held a rally in the Dule Temple at the onset of his rebellion against the Tang emperor. The name of the temple could be a reference to An Lushan, who was also known as An Dule. However, the name could also have originated from the Dule River that flows to northwest of the city, although it is not clear if the river's name predates that of the temple.

More artifacts were accidentally found in 1982 when the national government attempted to repair the temple's damage due to an earthquake. One of the artifacts documented the While Tower in the temple was rebuilt during the year 1058. It has been verified that all the murals in the Guan Yin Pavilion were added during a restoration work in 1753. And new buildings were constructed in the temple during that period.

In 1928, a unit of soldiers commanded by warlord Sun Dianying was stationed in the Dule Temple and used the main hall as barracks. Sun Dianying and his troops were responsible for the looting of the nearby Eastern Qing Tombs. A leftover from the military occupation of the temple are bullet holes in the timber frames that were inflicted during target practice.

In 1929, the temple was converted into the Jixian Village Normal School. A basketball court was built inside the temple and some of the stone steps were removed for this purpose. A plaque in the temple was removed, used as a bell for the school. There are traces of military demolition inside the temple, but it is generally well preserved. In the early 1930s, Dule Temple was studied by Japanese scholar Sadako Sekino and Chinese scholar Liang Sicheng, the author of China's first modern history on Chinese architecture.

== Restoration work (After 1949) ==
=== 1960s ===
The first modern restorations were done in the 1960s. During this period, the situation within China was turbulent. Many scholars and intellectuals were vandalized, and at the same time, many ancient buildings were damaged to different degrees during that period. Therefore, in 1966, Liang Sicheng proposed to install lightning rods, doors and windows for the temple, and to put barbed wire at the head of the sculpture of Guanyin. Timely allocation of funds by the local government has enabled the temple to be properly protected . Despite the rudimentary preservation, it was the best preservation that could be done at the time for historical reasons. In fact, this conservation work is targeted at local animals such as birds and bats standing on the top of some clay sculptures in the temple, and they can cause irreversible damage to the artefacts. Therefore, the additional wire fences, doors and windows, etc. suggested by Liang. As no traces of such interventions can now be found in the Dule Temple either, they should be reversible.

=== 1970-2000 ===
Later on, another restoration was undertaken in 1972, but the information on this restoration is scarce. During this restoration, the murals on the inner walls of the Guanyin Pavilion were discovered. In July 1976, the 1976 Tangshan earthquake hit the area, which was a 7.2 magnitude earthquake, and some parts of the White Tower in the Dule Temple collapsed. Fortunately, only some of the walls in the temple collapsed and the siding of the Guanyin Pavilion fell off. The rest of the temple remained intact except for the slight displacement of the beams and columns. From then on, the seismic performance of the Dule Temple began to become a research topic in the field of Chinese architecture. Later in 1982 the government undertook an official post-disaster restoration of the temple. Upon investigation, it was found that the top of the Guanyin sculpture (16.08 meters high) moved about 15 centimeters to the south-west. At that time, the internal structure of the statue was not clear, and the research team was unable to give a proper restoration plan in the first place, but could only temporarily prevent the statue from collapsing by adding some supports. At the same time, the research team found some cracks at the bottom of the sculpture.

=== After 2000 ===
The restoration of the Dule Temple was a long process that continued into the 21st century. During this time, the restoration of Dule Temple has been open to the public and undergoing restoration at the same time. In 2004, the restoration of the emperor's residence, the corridor and the west wall of the Dule Temple was completed. It wasn't until 2017 that a team of researchers finally came up with a suitable solution for sculpture restoration. Through digital modelling of the Guanyin statue and analysis of the pigment composition on the surface of the statue, etc., it was decided that the internal structure of the statue would be photographed through a pinhole camera. Under the premise of ensuring the safety of the statue, the action camera was strapped with led lights, good heat dissipation measures were taken, and the camera was inserted through the cracks to understand the internal structure of the statue. Until today, the restoration of the Dule Temple is still underway and is regularly inspected by experts. In 2023, a university team led by Professor Wang Huiqin used drones to scan the murals at Dule Temple, analyzing the painting techniques and types of pigments through advanced technology. This non-invasive testing technology has made a significant contribution to heritage detection and restoration and conservation.

== Description ==
The grand temple complex is located in the north and faces the south.

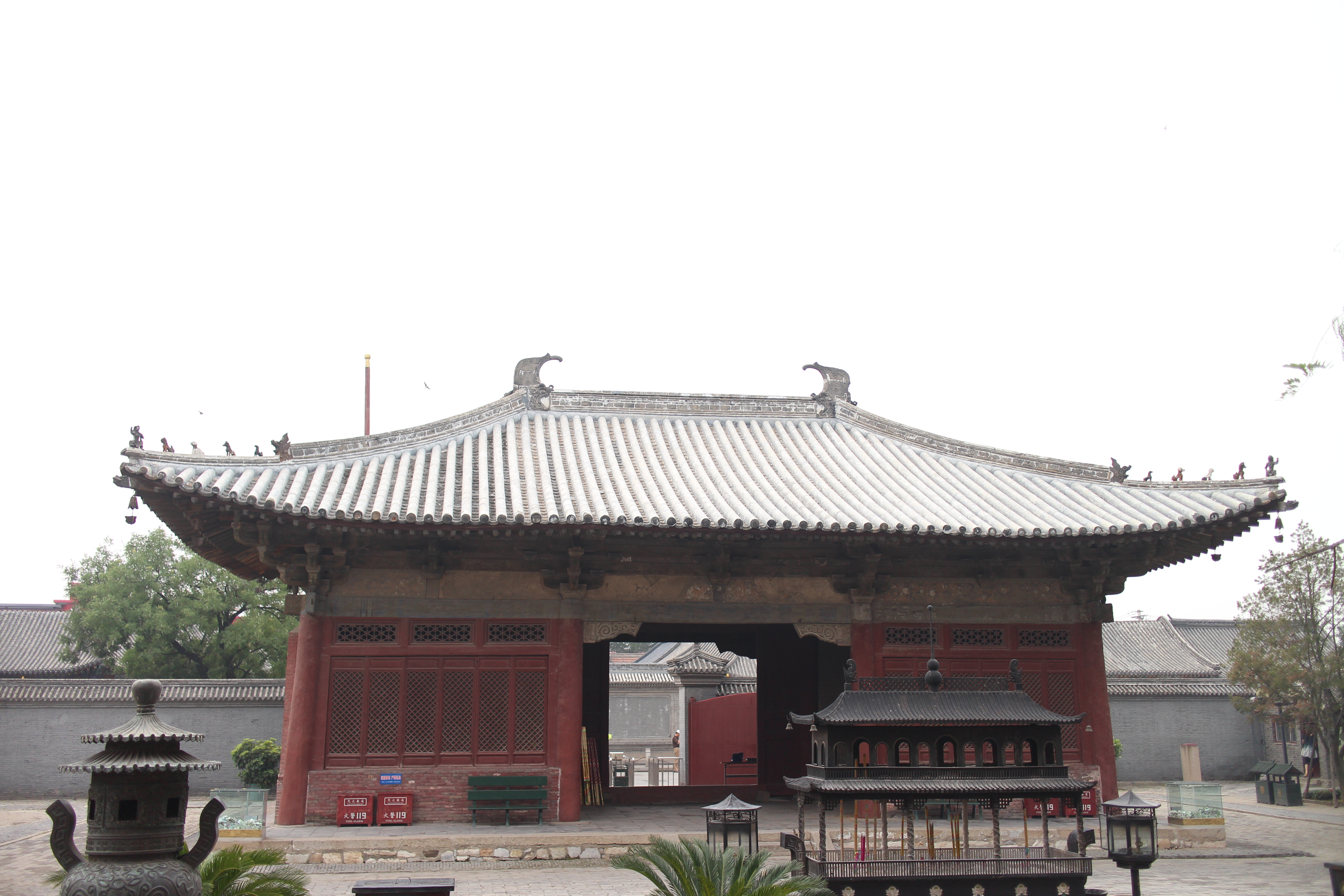
Shanmen of the temple

=== Shanmen ===
The shanmen is a single-story building that stands 10 meters tall and has three single-eaves Wudian roofs (庑殿顶; 廡殿頂; Wǔdiàn Dǐng; 'roofs with four slopes and five ridges'). It functions as the front gate on the temple's south side and houses the statues of two guardian kings. The Chiwen on both ends of the main ridge are the origin structures made in the Liao dynasty (907–1125). Under the south eaves is a plaque which is said to be the handwriting of the prime minister Yan Song (1480–1567) in the Ming dynasty (1368–1644). Inside the hall are two colored clay statues of Heng and Ha made in the Liao dynasty and frescos of the Four Heavenly Kings drawn in the Qing dynasty (1644–1911). This shanmen is one of the Eight Great Architectures of the Liao Dynasty.

=== Guanyin Pavilion ===
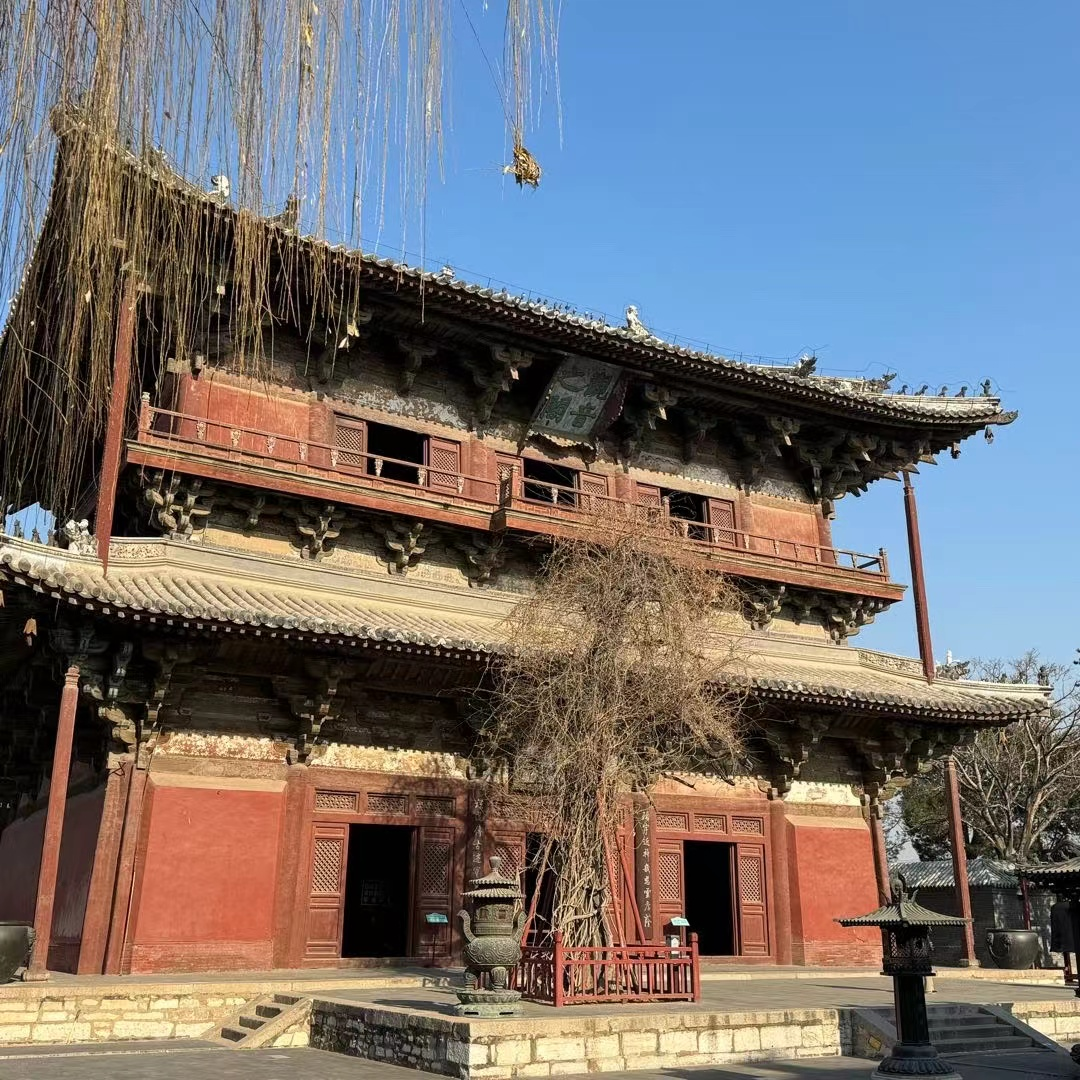
Guanyin Pavilion

The Guanyin Pavilion is a three-story timber structure with five single-eaves Xieshan roofs (歇山顶; 歇山頂; Xiēshān Dǐng; 'half-hipped', 'half-gabled roofs'). The pavilion has a height of about 23 meters and consists of more than one thousand individual pieces. Inside the hall there is a clay statue of Shiyimian Guanyin (十一面观音; 十一面觀音; Shíyīmiàn Guānyīn), or Ekādaśamukha, meaning “Eleven-Headed Guanyin”. The statue, measuring 16 meters in height, is the biggest of its kind in China. This statue of Guanyin was constructed in the Liao dynasty (907–1125), but the artistic style is similar to that in the flourishing period of the Tang dynasty (618–907). On both sides of the statue of Guanyin are statues of his attendants, also made in the Liao dynasty. The pavilion centers with the statue of Guanyin and has two rows of column pillars around. The design which sets dougong on the pillars and architraves on the dougong in each layer separates the pavilion into three stories and makes it easier for people to pay tribute to Guanyin from different angles. The architrave are placed around the statue and the patio formed in the center is covered with an octagonal caisson (八角形藻井), which closely integrates the entire interior space and the statue. The thousands of beams, columns and architraves in the pavilion are arranged in an ordered way with high technique, which shows the excellent wooden architecture technology and achievements in the Liao dynasty.

== Gallery ==
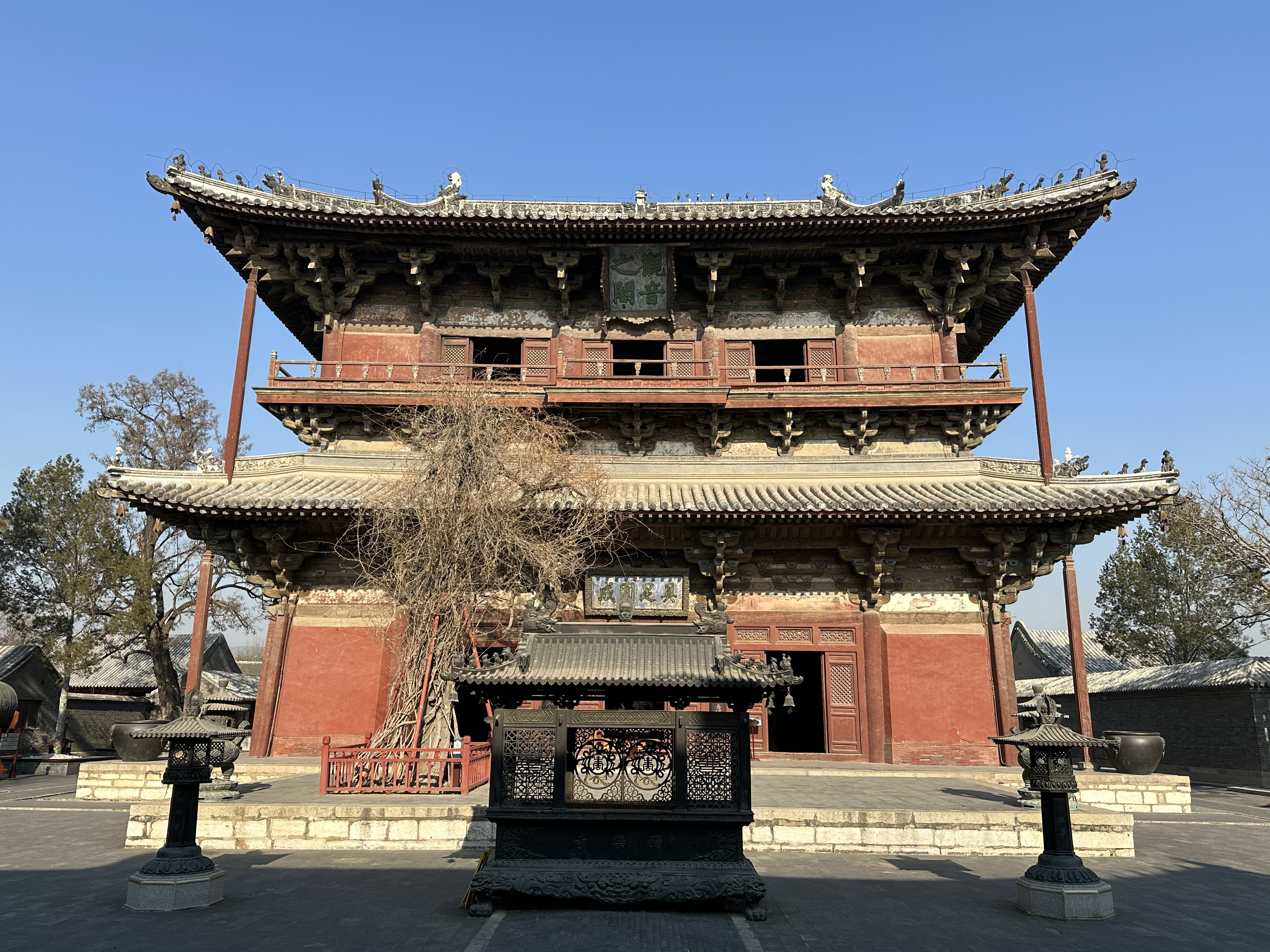
Front view of Guanyin Pavilion

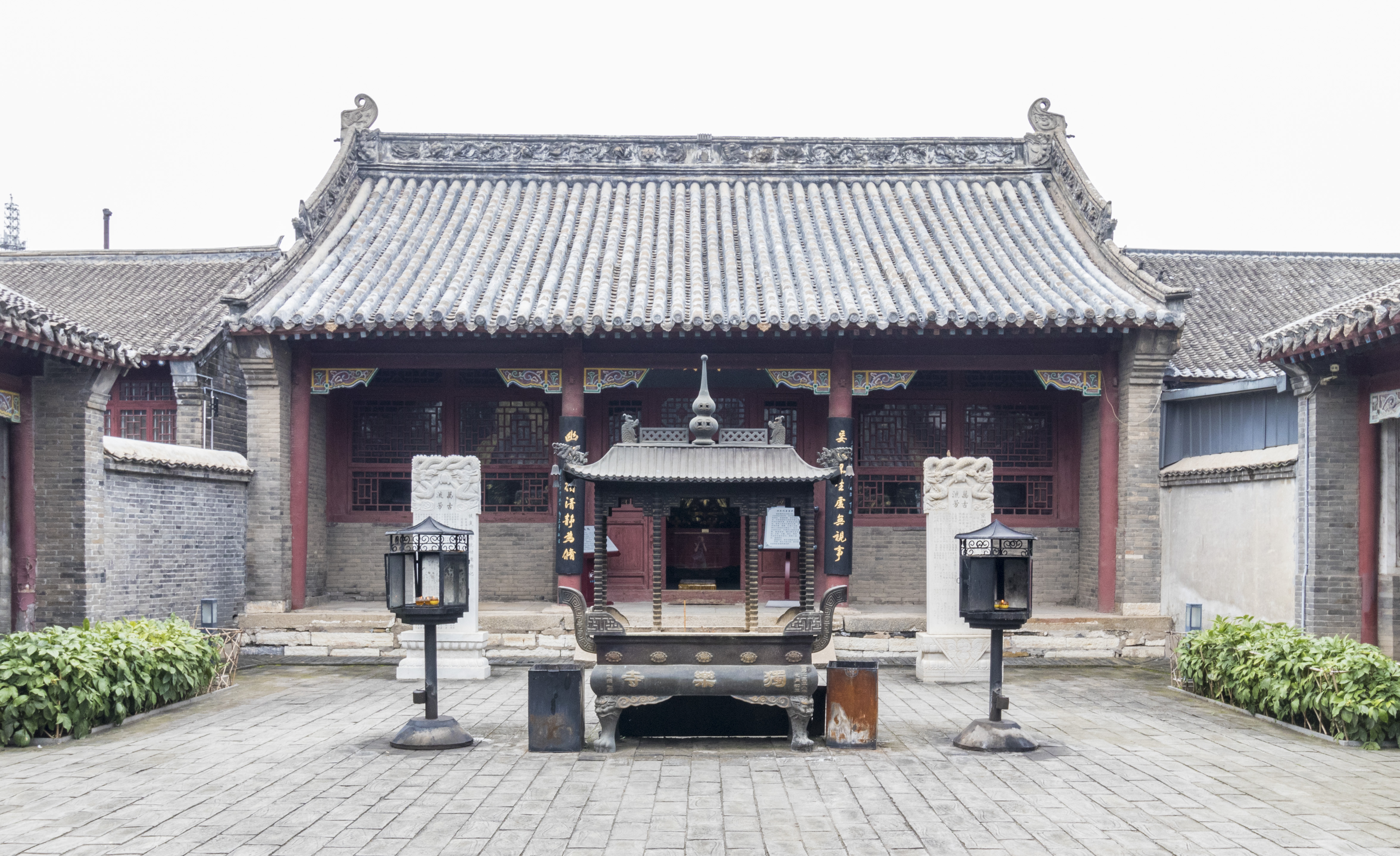
Temple courtyard

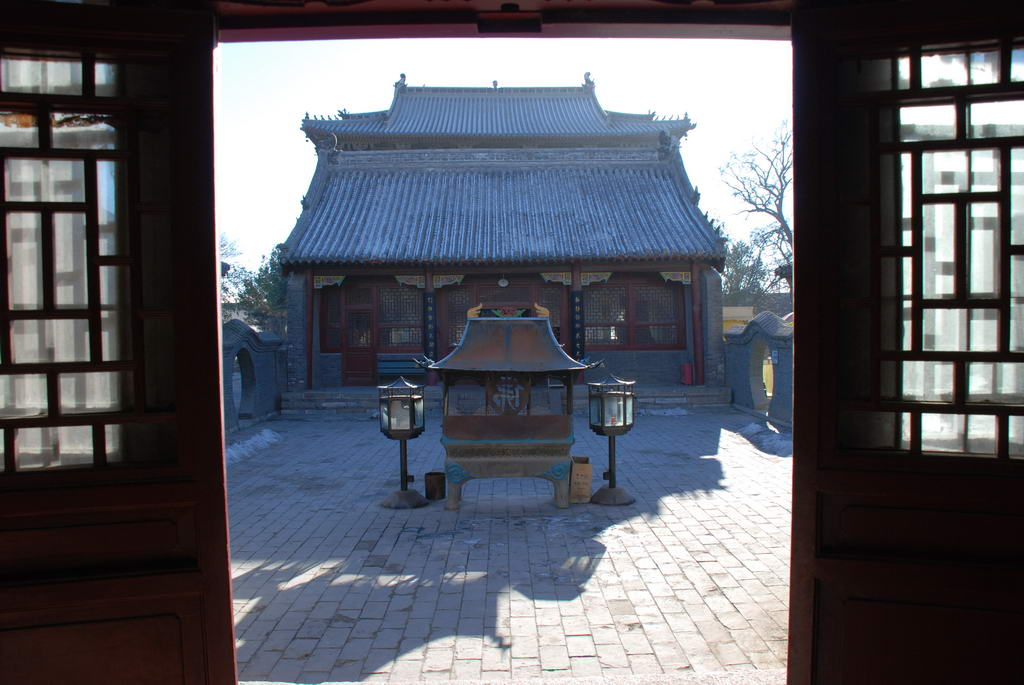
View from within the Guanyin Pavilion

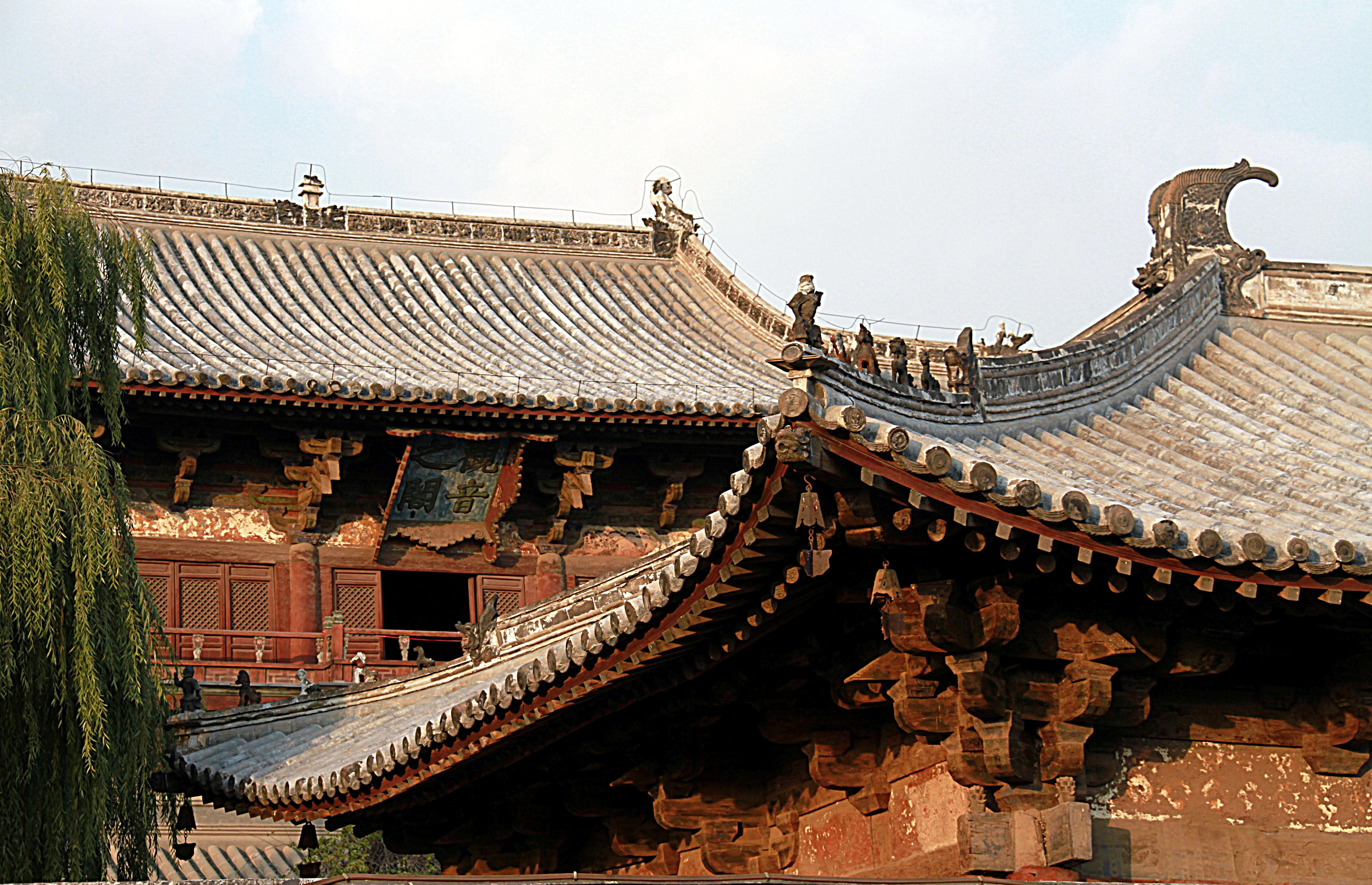
Temple roof exhibiting a xieshan hip-and-gable style

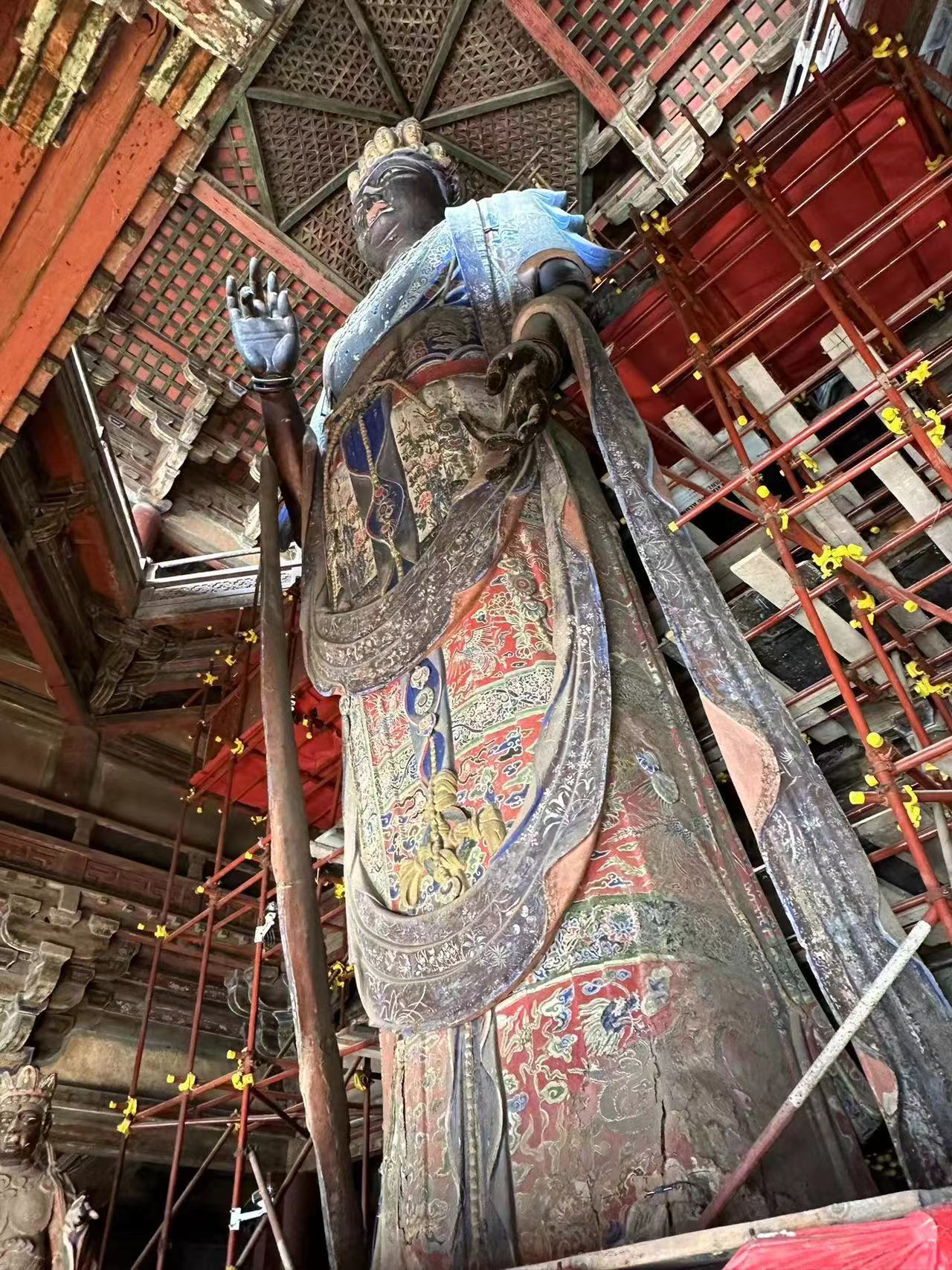
Eleven Faced Avalokitesvara (Guanyin)

== Location ==
The Dule Temple is located in the center of Jizhou District. Its address is 41 Wuding Street, Jizhou District, Tianjin (Chinese: 天津市蓟县城内武定街41号; pinyin: Tiānjīn Shì Jìxiàn Chéngnèi Wǔdìng Jiē 41 hào).

== See also ==
- Pagoda of Fogong Temple, another wooden structure from the Liao dynasty (built in 1056)
