= Wenchang Subdistrict, Tianjin =

Wenchang Subdistrict 文昌街道
- Town
- Location in Tianjin
- Coordinates: 40°2′35″N 117°24′16″E
- Country: People's Republic of China
- Municipality: Tianjin
- District: Jizhou

Population (2010)
  - Total: 89,207

Wenchang Subdistrict (Chinese: 文昌街道; pinyin: Wénchāng Jiēdào) is a township-level division and the county seat of Jizhou District, Tianjin, China.
