= Sungezhuang Manchu Ethnic Township =

Sungezhuang Manchu Ethnic Township 孙各庄满族乡 ᠰᡠᠨ ᡤᡝ ᡷᡠᠠᠩ ᠮᠠᠨᠵᡠ ᡠᡴᠰᡠᡵᠠᡳ ᡤᠠᡧᠠᠨ
- Town
- Pinyin: Sūngèzhuāng Mǎnzú Xiāng; Möllendorff: Sun ge juang Manju Uksurai Gašan
- Location in Tianjin Sungezhuang (China)
- Coordinates: 40°8′7″N 117°35′30″E
- Country: People's Republic of China
- Municipality: Tianjin
- District: Jizhou District

Population (2010)
  - Total: 6,717

Sungezhuang Manchu Ethnic Township (simplified Chinese: 孙各庄满族乡; traditional Chinese: 孫各莊滿族鄉; pinyin: Sūngèzhuāng Mǎnzú Xiāng), Manchu: ᠰᡠᠨ ᡤᡝ ᡷᡠᠠᠩ
ᠮᠠᠨᠵᡠ
ᡠᡴᠰᡠᡵᠠᡳ
ᡤᠠᡧᠠᠨ, Möllendorff romanization: sun ge juang manju uksurai gašan) is a township-level division in Jizhou District, Tianjin, China.
