= Great Wall Marathon =

Annual marathon race on the Great Wall of China

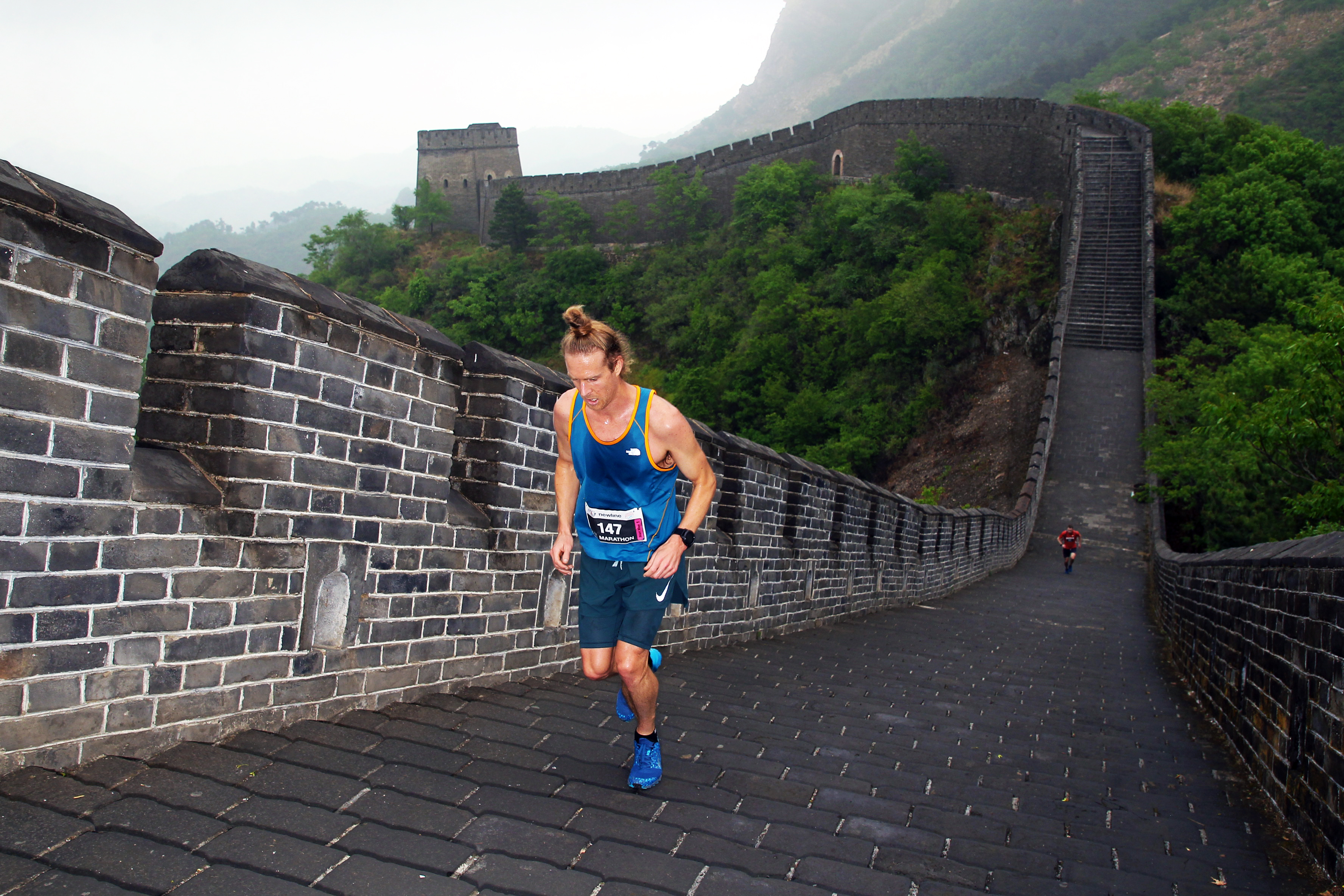
- Date: May
- Location: Huangya Pass, Great Wall of China, China
- Event type: Road
- Distance: Marathon, Half marathon
- Established: 1999
- Organizer: Albatros Adventure Marathons
- Course records: Men's: 3:09:18 (2013) (United States) Jorge Maravilla; Women's: 3:32:12 (2013) (Italy) Silvia Serafini
- Website: Great Wall Marathon
- Participants: 645 (2019)

The Great Wall Marathon is an annual marathon race, traditionally held on the third Saturday of May along and on the Huangyaguan or Huangya Pass (simplified Chinese: 黄崖关; traditional Chinese: 黃崖關; pinyin: Huángyáguān; lit. 'Yellow Cliff Pass'), Tianjin section of the Great Wall of China, East of Beijing. Since it first started in 1999, the race has grown to several hundred participants. The event includes a full marathon (42.2k), half marathon (21.1k), 10k, and 5k distances. Aside from the main marathon, a half marathon, 10 km and 5 km runs were also held until 2012. 2013 marked the debut of an 8.5 km "fun run", replacing the 5 and 10 km distances. The course is more demanding than traditional marathons, with participants challenged by 5,164 stone steps and many steep ascents and descents.

The race is an international marathon whose course runs entirely on the Great Wall of China. The course traverses through the Simatai (simplified Chinese: 司马台; traditional Chinese: 司馬臺; pinyin: Sīmǎtái), a section of the Great Wall of China located in the north of Miyun District, 120 km northeast of Beijing, and Jinshanling (simplified Chinese: 金山岭; traditional Chinese: 金山嶺; pinyin: Jīnshānlǐng), a section of the Great Wall of China located in the mountainous area in Luanping County, 125 km northeast of Beijing.

== Running conditions ==
The course is known for its difficult conditions, including more than 20,000 stone steps that vary in height from a few centimeters to over 40 cm, with many original sections consisting of rubble, and approximately 30 km of running on the Great Wall of China. Although a small portion of the Great Wall on the course has been restored, much of the Great Wall remains in its original state. Runners encounter loose stones, gravel, missing steps, and crumbling walls, along with sections where vegetation has grown over the path. There are sections of the course where runners must exit the Great Wall and run on a trail alongside the wall to avoid hazards.

== Course elevation ==
The Great Wall of China Marathon course varies in height by around 200m (about 650 feet) between the start line and the highest point at East Tower 20. Stone guard towers are spread along the length of the wall, each some 200m to 300m apart. Stone steps and walkways, following the up and down contours of the ground, connect the towers. The effect this creates for runners is similar to interval training, with an effort required to climb up, followed by a recovery period coming down.

== Time limits ==
There is a 10-hour time limit for all races, with a start time of approximately 6:00 AM and a 4:00 PM cut-off time. Participants must maintain a pace faster than the course time limits in order to complete the race.

== Winners ==
Key:

Course record

Edition	Year	Men's winner	Time (h:m:s)	Women's winner	Time (h:m:s)
1st	1999	Niels-Magnus Jensen (DEN)	3:16:55	Kersti Jacobsen (DEN)	V
2nd	2000	Martin-Grønhol Steinbach (DEN)	4:11:29	Ingelise Jensen (DEN)	5:22:30
3rd	2001	Zi Jixiang (CHN)	3:50:24	Jill Westenra (NZL)	4:06:07
4th	2002	Zi Jixiang (CHN)	3:41:30	Lisbeth Nielsen (DEN)	4:12:42
–	2003	Was not held			
5th	2004	Josef Miesracher (AUT)	3:38:35	Sarah Cook (GBR)	4:26:03
6th	2005	Gregory Feucht (USA)	3:25:13	Jennifer Burtner (USA)	4:30:57
7th	2006	David Ardern (GBR)	3:38:07	Margaret Stewart (NZL)	4:16:58
8th	2007	Salvador Calvo (ESP)	3:23:10	Sara Winter (NZL)	3:50:21
9th	2008	Romualdo Sánchez (MEX)	3:18:48	Leanne Juul (RSA)	4:09:10
10th	2009	Justin Walker (USA)	3:40:54	Joanna Gosse (NZL)	4:03:23
11th	2010	Qiang Tong (HKG)	3:24:44	Inez-Anne Haagen (NED)	3:56:38
12th	2011	Yun Yanqiao (CHN)	3:18:48	Mari Kauri (FIN)	4:11:19
13th	2012	Luis Alonso (ESP)	3:39:28	Mari Kauri (FIN)	4:10:43
14th	2013	Jorge Maravilla (USA)	3:09:18	Silvia Serafini (ITA)	3:32:12
15th	2014	Ernesto Ciravegna (ITA)	3:33:56	Sofia García (ESP)	3:57:25
16th	2015	Jason Shen (CHN)	3:41:40	Eleanor Fuqua (USA)	4:18:35
17th	2016	Jason Shen (CHN)	3:30:49	Hannah Muir-Hutchinson (CAN)	4:25:35
18th	2017	Marcin Świerc (POL)	3:14:34	Sofie Nelsson (SWE)	4:11:21
19th	2018	Oscar Perego (ITA)	3:51:12	Olga Baranova (RUS)	4:28:59
20th	2019	Douglas Wilson (AUS)	3:25:25	Kali Cavey (USA)	4:12:27
–	2020	Was not held			
–	2021				
–	2022				
–	2023				
21st	2024	Mark Dickson (GBR)	3:43:32	Nadège Person (FRA)	4:36:34

== Previous editions ==
=== 2003 ===
2003, Albatros Adventure Marathons cancelled The Great Wall Marathon due to the SARS epidemic.

=== 2007 ===
The winner was Salvador Calvo, whose time of 3:23:10 broke the previous course record by four minutes.

=== 2008 ===
Saturday May 17, 2008: The previous race record was broken by Great Wall Marathon first-timer Romualdo Sanchez Garita from Mexico. His finish time was 3:18:48. The fastest woman in the field was South African Leanne Juul, who finished in 4:09:10.

=== 2009 ===
Saturday May 16, 2009: There were 1,363 runners in the four distances. More than 40 countries were represented.

=== 2010 ===
Saturday May 15, 2010: A record number of 1,748 participants from around the world ran the four distances.

=== 2011 ===
Saturday May 21, 2011

=== 2012 ===
Saturday May 18, 2012

=== 2013 ===
Saturday May 18, 2013: The fastest runners in the marathon were: Jorge Maravilla (USA), Dimitris Theodorakakos (Greece) and Jonathan Wyatt (New Zealand) who crossed the finish line together in record time, 3:09:18 Silvia Serafini, Italy, 3:32:12 (a new women's record)

The half-marathon was won by Geoffrey de Bilderling with a time of 1 hour 38 minutes 56 seconds.

=== 2014 ===
Saturday May 17, 2014

=== 2015 ===
The 2015 race was held on Saturday, 16 May.

=== 2019 ===
The 2019 race was held on Saturday, 18 May.

=== 2020 ===
The 2020 edition of the race was cancelled due to the coronavirus pandemic.

=== 2021 ===
The 2021 edition of the race was cancelled due to the coronavirus pandemic.

=== 2022 ===
The 2022 edition of the race was cancelled due to the coronavirus pandemic.
