= Michael Booth (runner) =

Australian marathon runner

Michael John Booth
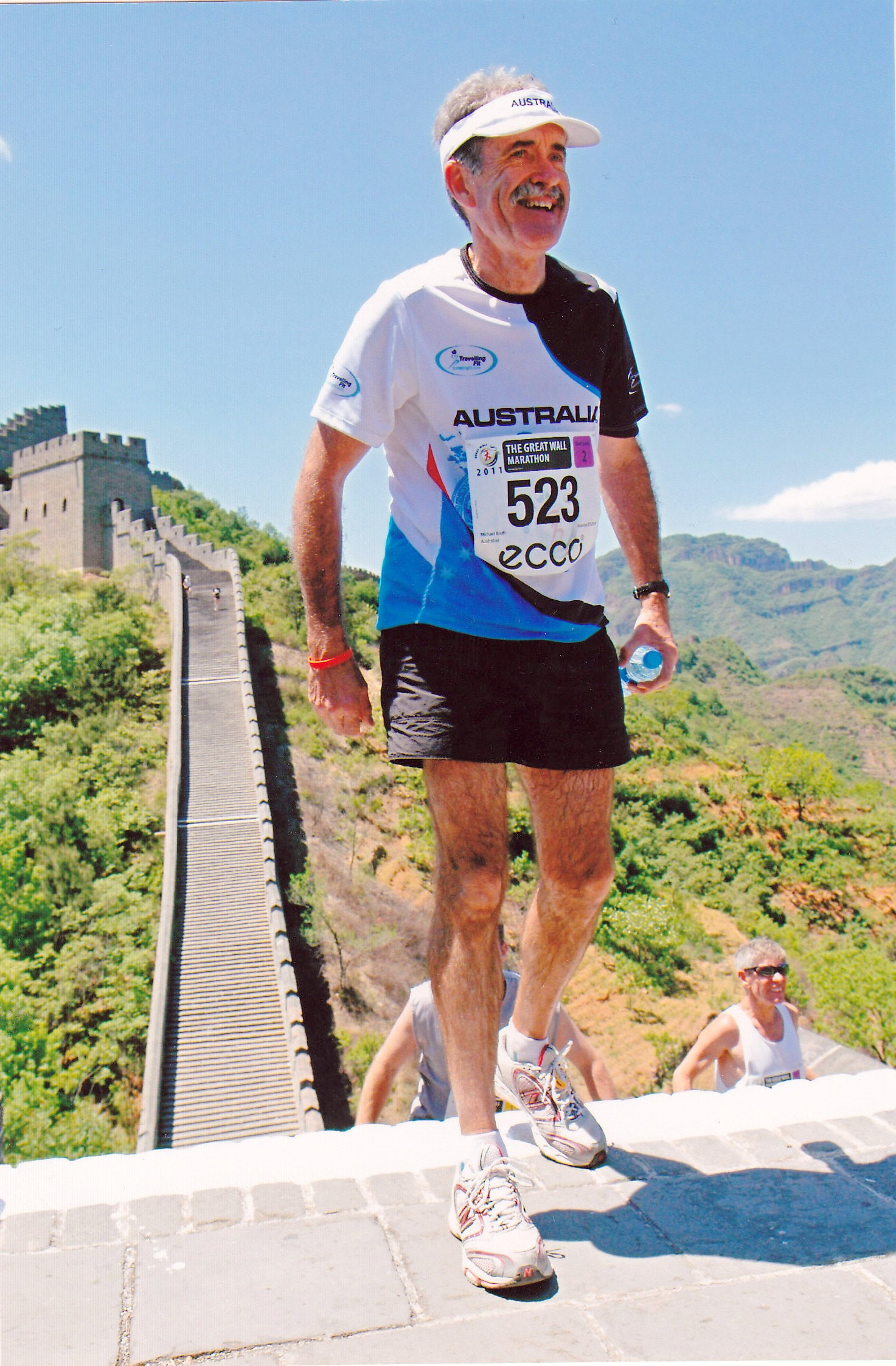
- Born: 12 May 1954 (age 71); Riverside, Tasmania

Michael Booth is an Australian marathon runner from Launceston, Tasmania. Booth has completed 100 marathons.

== Personal life ==
Booth is a retired accountant, and has a wife, four children, and grandchildren.

== Marathons ==
Booth began running in 2002 at the age of 48, after a run with his brother David Booth "up and down" Cormiston Road in Launceston, Tasmania. In 2003, he began running four days a week and recording his runs. He completed his first marathon in Hobart in 2003, and since then has undertaken marathons in each Australian state and territory and on each continent. Of marathon running, Booth says that "it's a lifestyle" and "it's getting out in nature, it's running around the country roads".

In 2019, Booth completed his 40,075th kilometre—the length of the equator—during the Hobart Marathon, his 83rd marathon, with the 2810 total runs in the sixteen years to 13 January 2019.

Notable marathons completed by Booth include:

- Africa (Comrades Marathon, Durban, 2007)
- North America (Boston Marathon, 2009)
- Europe (Athens Marathon, 2010)
- Asia (Great Wall Marathon, 2011)
- South America (Rio de Janeiro, 2012)
- Antarctica (Antarctica Marathon, 2014)
- Six Foot Track Marathon, NSW
- Sydney Marathon, NSW
- Sunshine Coast Marathon, Qld
- Gold Coast Marathon, Qld
- Great Ocean Road Marathon, Vic
- Melbourne Marathon, Vic
- Alice Springs Marathon, NT
- Adelaide Marathon, SA
- Perth Marathon, WA
- Convicts and Wrenches Marathon, Tas
- Cradle Mountain Run, Tas
- Bruny Island Ultra Race, Tas—of which he was the winner in 2003
- Cadbury Marathon, Tas

Booth also competed in the 2003 Australian Three Peaks Race onboard Underwater Video Systems as a runner with his long-time running partner David MacFarlane. They won the fully crewed division and were Kings of the Mountain.

He was the first Tasmanian and eighth Australian to run a marathon on all seven continents.

He finished his 100th marathon on 13 August 2023, the Sunshine Coast Marathon in Queensland.
