= Jizhou, Tianjin =

Jizhou 蓟州区
- District
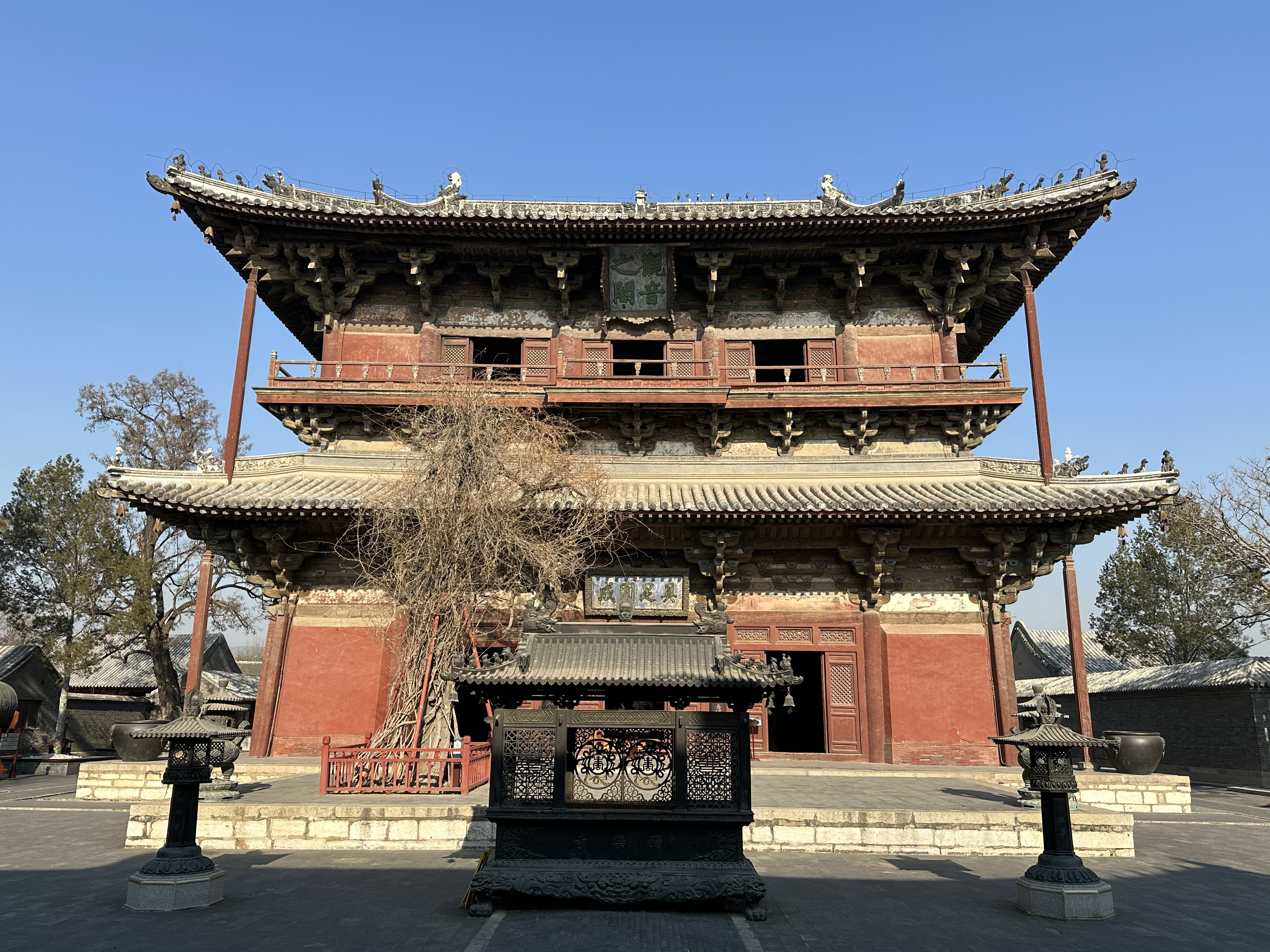
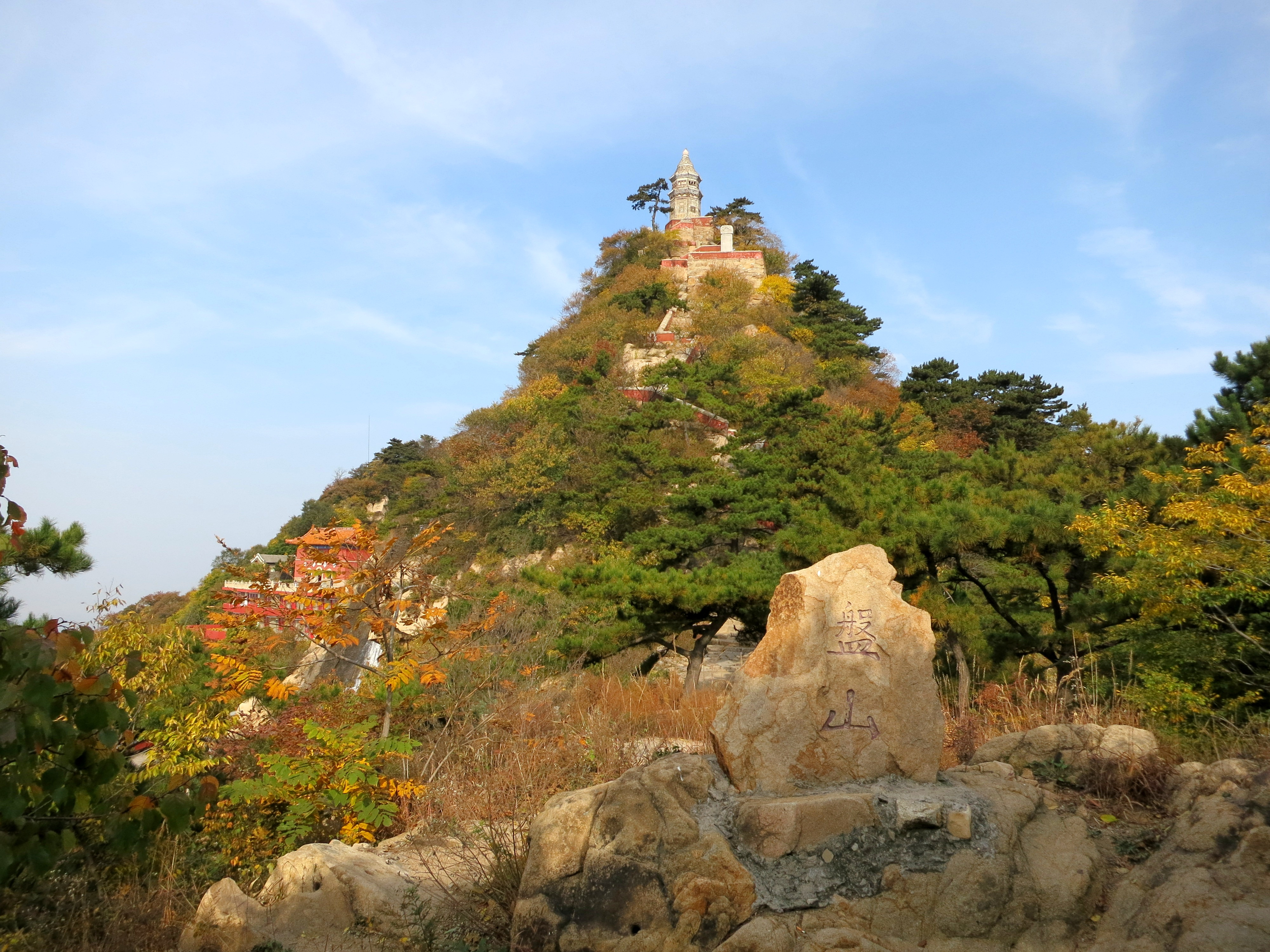
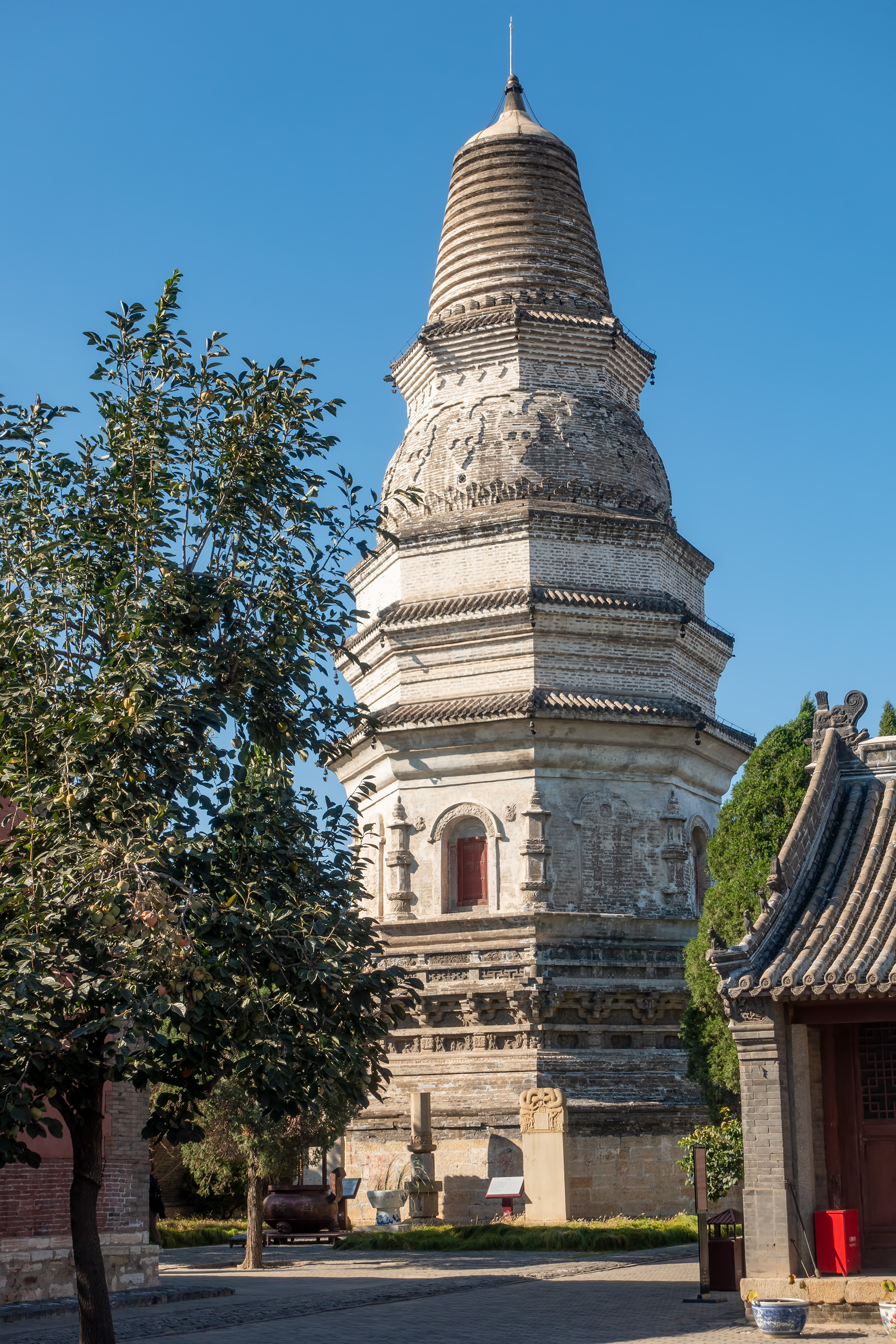
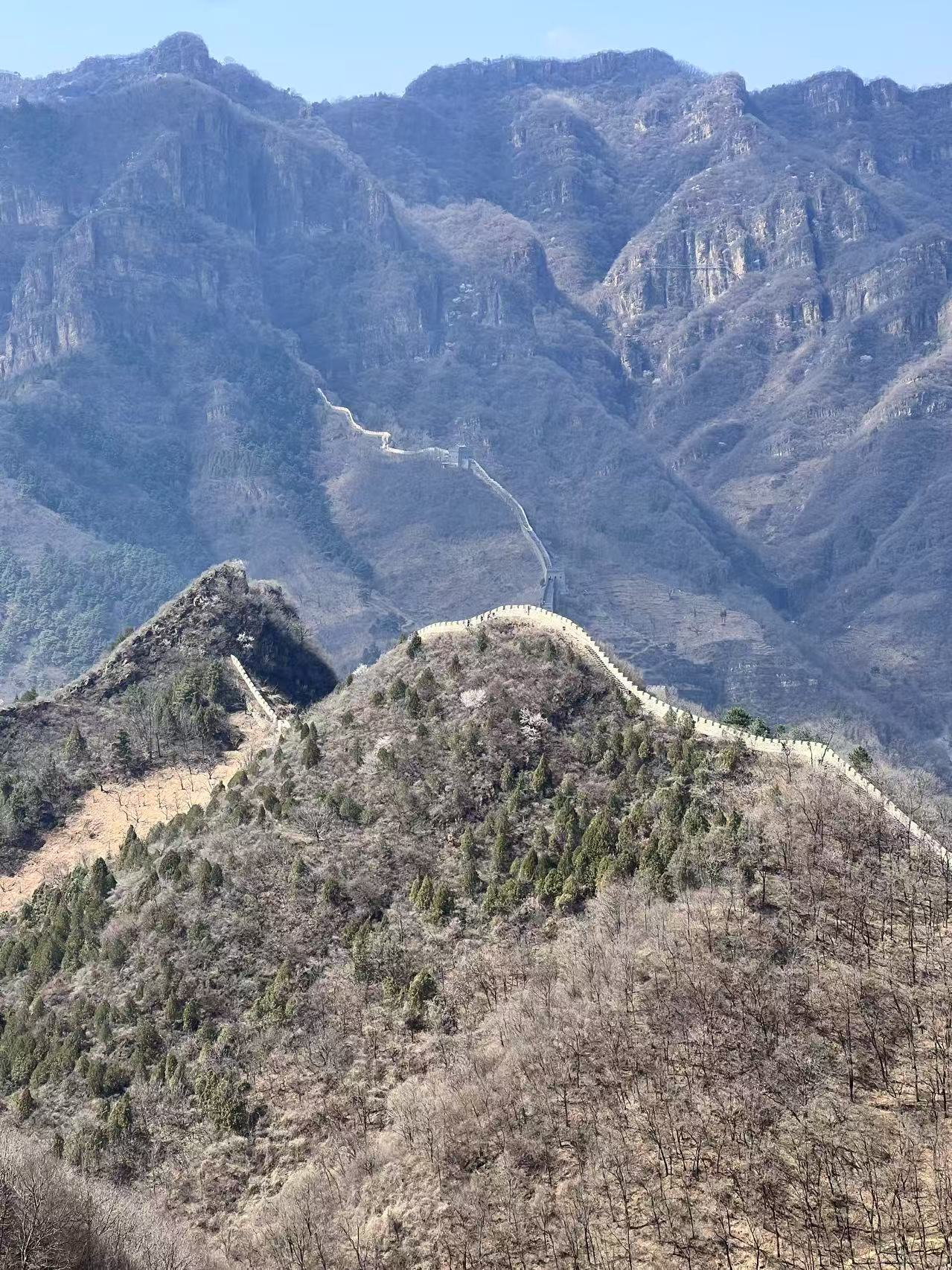
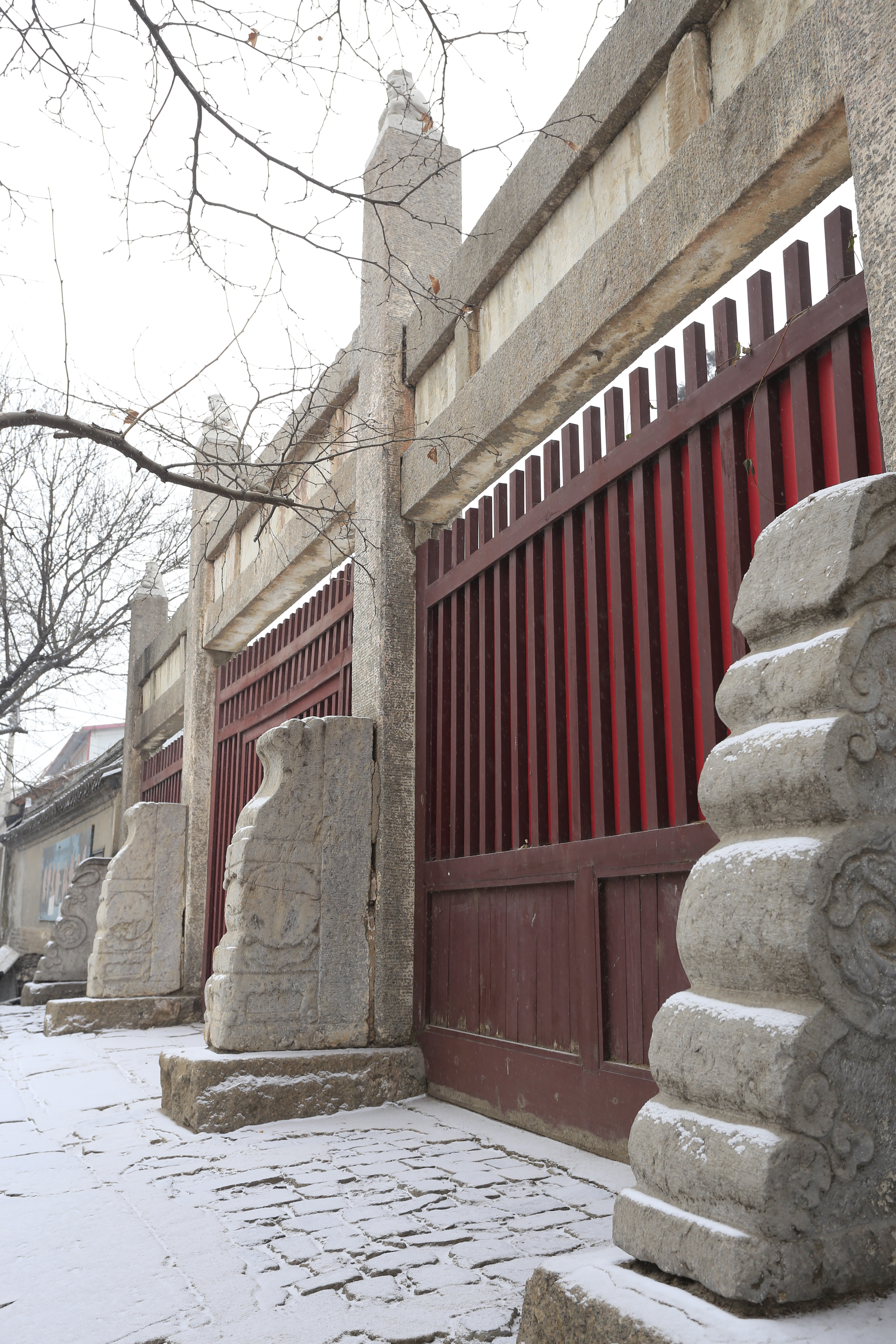
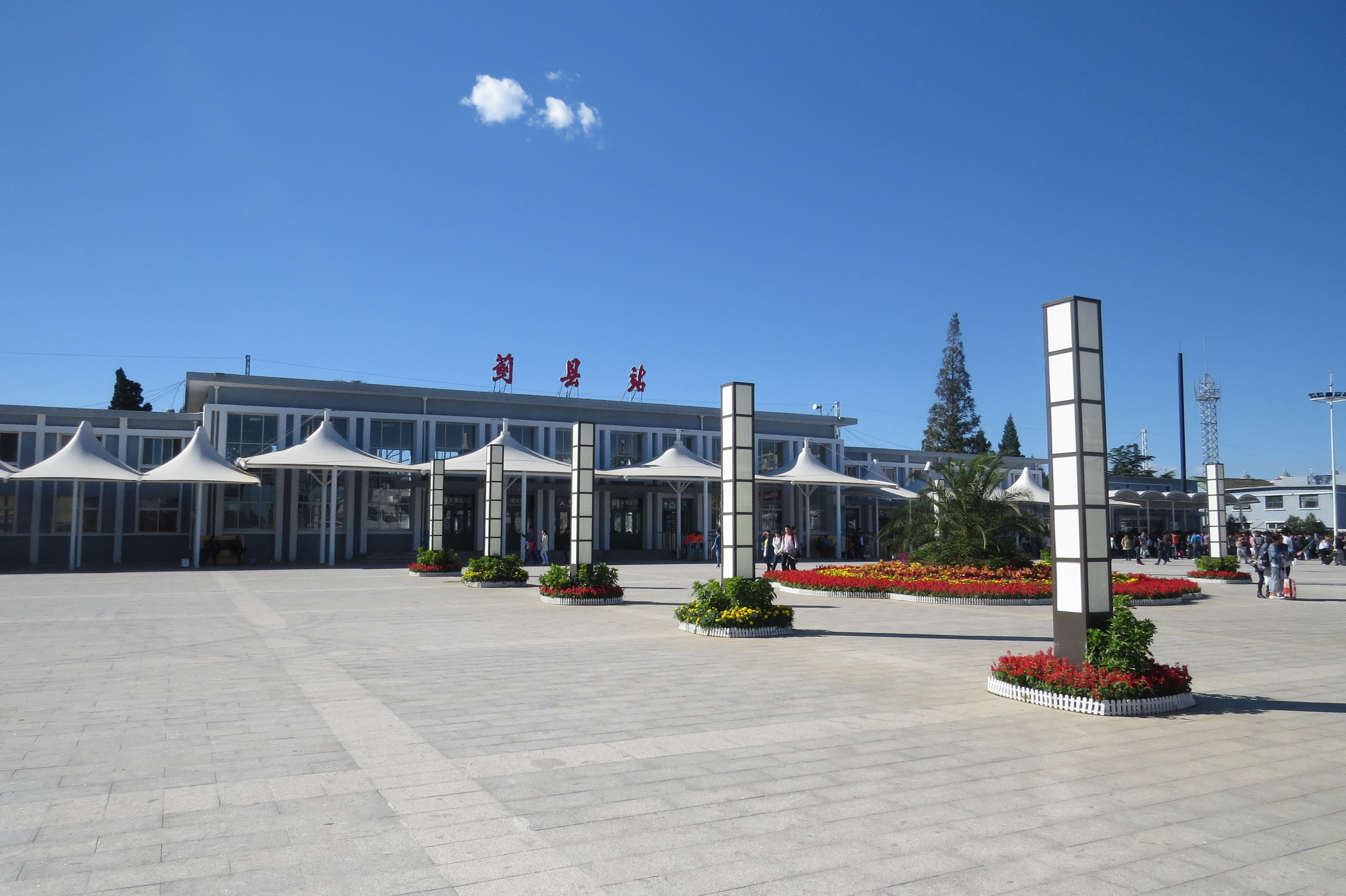
- Dule Temple Mount Panshan White Pagoda of Jizhou The Great Wall at Huangyaguan Jixian Confucian Temple Jizhou railway station Fujun Mountain Park
- Interactive map of Jizhou
- Coordinates: 40°02′45″N 117°24′30″E
- Country: People's Republic of China
- Municipality: Tianjin
- Township-level divisions: 1 subdistrict 25 towns 1 township
- County seat: Wenchang Subdistrict (文昌街道)

Area
  - Total: 1,590 km^{2} (610 sq mi)

Population (2020)
  - Total: 795,516
  - Density: 500/km^{2} (1,300/sq mi)
- Time zone: UTC+8 (China Standard)
- Postal code: 301900
- Area code: 0022
Tianjin district map
Subdivisions of Tianjin
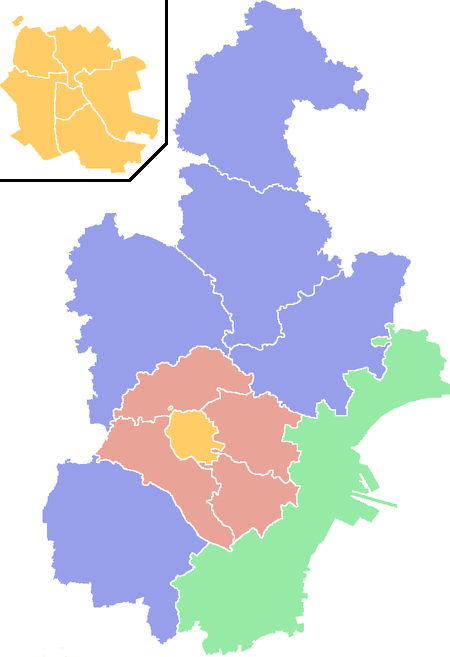
Core districts See inset
| 1 | Heping |
| 2 | Hedong |
| 3 | Hexi |
| 4 | Nankai |
| 5 | Hebei |
| 6 | Hongqiao |
Suburbs
| 7 | Dongli |
| 8 | Xiqing |
| 9 | Jinnan |
| 10 | Beichen |
Binhai and Rural
| 13 | Binhai | 14 | Ninghe |
| 11 | Wuqing | 15 | Jinghai |
| 12 | Baodi | 16 | Ji Zhou |
- Website: www.tjjz.gov.cn

Jizhou District (simplified Chinese: 蓟州区; traditional Chinese: 薊州區; pinyin: Jìzhōu Qū), formerly a county known as Ji County, is a district in the far north of the municipality of Tianjin, People's Republic of China, holding cultural and historical significance (e.g., the Buddhist Temple of Solitary Joy).

== Overview ==
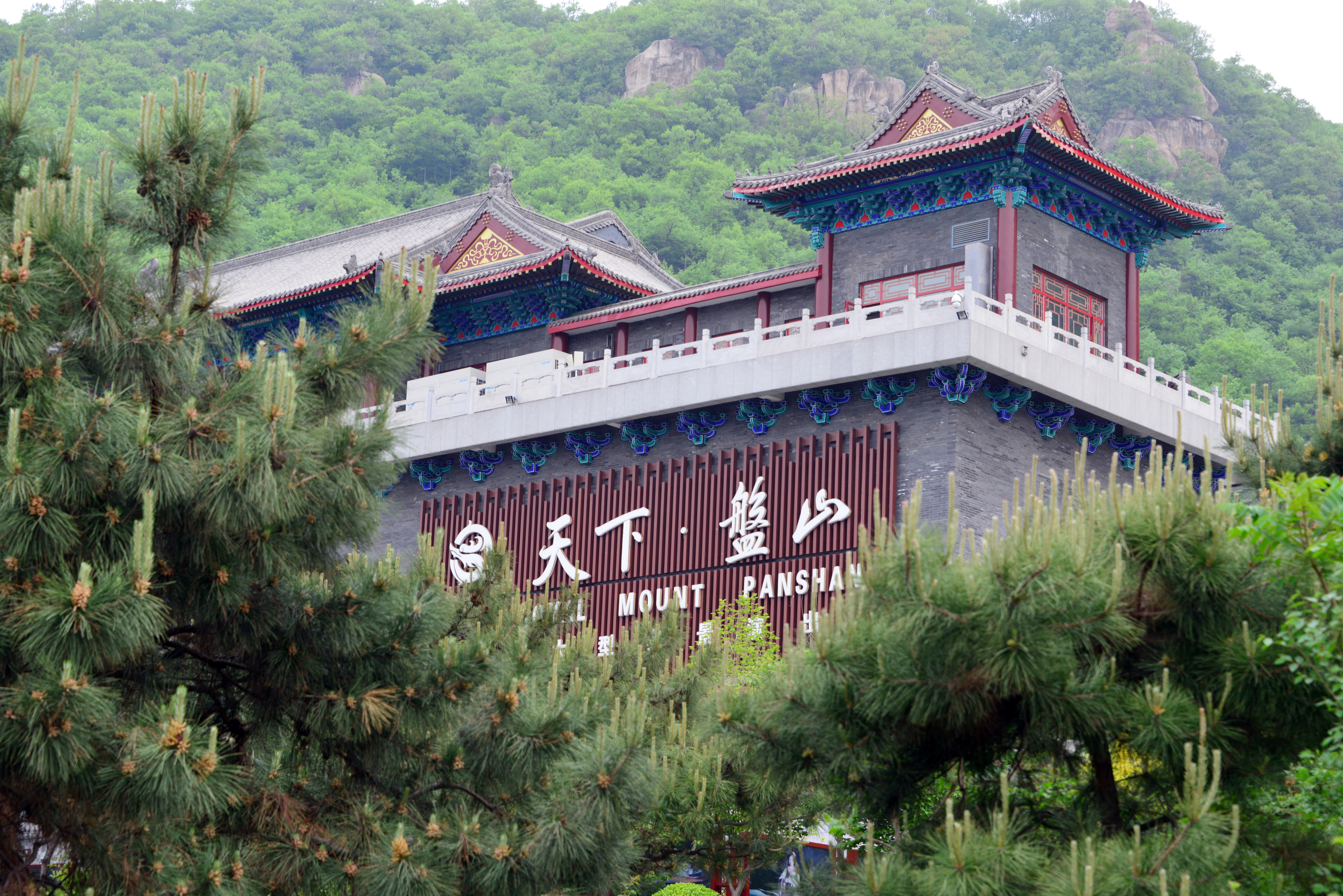
Panshan resort

The administration of Jizhou was transferred from Hebei province to Tianjin in 1973. Historically, it was also known as Yuyang (渔阳; 漁陽; Yúyáng) during the Tang dynasty.

Jizhou is the only mountainous area in the Tianjin municipality, home to the renowned Mount Pan. Known as "Tianjin's backyard", the natural scenery and numerous historical monuments, including a small section of the Great Wall known as Huangyaguan, in the county means that it is a major tourist attraction. It is also well known for its abundance of unique, local fruits and nuts.

Jizhou is approximately 115 km (71 mi) away from the city proper of Tianjin. It has an area of 1,590 square kilometres (610 sq mi) and a population of 800,000.

== Administrative divisions ==
There are 1 subdistrict, 25 towns, and 1 ethnic township in the county:

| Name | Chinese (S) | Hanyu Pinyin | Population (2010) | Area (km^{2}) |
|---|---|---|---|---|
| Wenchang Subdistrict | 文昌街道 | Wénchāng Jiēdào | 89,207 | |
| Yuyang town | 渔阳镇 | Yúyáng Zhèn | 57,669 | 77 |
| Xiaying town | 下营镇 | Xiàyíng Zhèn | 18,759 | |
| Xiacang town | 下仓镇 | Xiàcāng Zhèn | 41,717 | 71.5 |
| Sangzi town | 桑梓镇 | Sāngzǐ Zhèn | 36,586 | 60 |
| Chutouling town | 出头岭镇 | Chūtóulǐng Zhèn | 34,362 | 58.6 |
| Luozhuangzi town | 罗庄子镇 | Luōzhuāngzi Zhèn | 12,253 | 99 |
| Wubaihu town | 五百户镇 | Wǔbǎihù Zhèn | 22,692 | 61.46 |
| Xiawotou town | 下窝头镇 | Xiàwōtóu Zhèn | 26,769 | |
| Baijian town | 白涧镇 | Báijiàn Zhèn | 18,646 | 50 |
| Bangjun town | 邦均镇 | Bāngjūn Zhèn | 31,343 | 34.73 |
| Yinliu town | 洇溜镇 | Yīnliū Zhèn | 23,915 | 29 |
| Bieshan town | 别山镇 | Biéshān Zhèn | 43,848 | 51 |
| Mashenqiao town | 马伸桥镇 | Mǎshēnqiáo Zhèn | 34,763 | 30 |
| Youguzhuang town | 尤古庄镇 | Yóugǔzhuāng Zhèn | 24,601 | |
| Houjiaying town | 侯家营镇 | Hóujiāyíng Zhèn | 37,346 | 55.58 |
| Yangjinzhuang town | 杨津庄镇 | Yángjīnzhuāng Zhèn | 33,028 | |
| Shangcang town | 上仓镇 | Shàngcāng Zhèn | 33,380 | |
| Guanzhuang town | 官庄镇 | Guānzhuāng Zhèn | 30,640 | |
| Dongshigu town | 东施古镇 | Dōngshīgǔ Zhèn | 15,994 | 27.36 |
| Xilonghuyu town | 西龙虎峪镇 | Xīlónghǔyù Zhèn | 25,196 | 45 |
| Chuanfangyu town | 穿芳峪镇 | Chuānfāngyù Zhèn | 14,548 | |
| Xujiatai town | 许家台镇 | Xǔjiātái Zhèn | 10,634 | |
| Limingzhuang town | 礼明庄镇 | Lǐmíngzhuāng Zhèn | 23,582 | |
| Dong'erying town | 东二营镇 | Dōng'èryíng Zhèn | 16,961 | |
| Dongzhaogezhuang town | 东赵各庄镇 | Dōngzhàogèzhuāng Zhèn | 19,633 | 29.42 |
| Sungezhuang Manchu Ethnic Township | 孙各庄满族乡 | Sūngèzhuāng Mǎnzú Xiāng | 6,717 | 26 |

== Climate ==
Climate data for Jizhou District, elevation 32 m (105 ft), (1991–2020 normals, extremes 1981–2025)
| Month | Jan | Feb | Mar | Apr | May | Jun | Jul | Aug | Sep | Oct | Nov | Dec | Year |
|---|---|---|---|---|---|---|---|---|---|---|---|---|---|
| Record high °C (°F) | 13.6 (56.5) | 20.0 (68.0) | 28.6 (83.5) | 32.9 (91.2) | 37.5 (99.5) | 39.7 (103.5) | 41.7 (107.1) | 37.3 (99.1) | 35.0 (95.0) | 30.4 (86.7) | 22.5 (72.5) | 14.6 (58.3) | 41.7 (107.1) |
| Mean daily maximum °C (°F) | 2.0 (35.6) | 5.9 (42.6) | 13.0 (55.4) | 20.9 (69.6) | 27.1 (80.8) | 30.6 (87.1) | 31.6 (88.9) | 30.7 (87.3) | 26.6 (79.9) | 19.3 (66.7) | 10.1 (50.2) | 3.3 (37.9) | 18.4 (65.2) |
| Daily mean °C (°F) | −3.5 (25.7) | 0.1 (32.2) | 7.0 (44.6) | 14.8 (58.6) | 21.0 (69.8) | 24.9 (76.8) | 27.0 (80.6) | 26.1 (79.0) | 21.2 (70.2) | 13.6 (56.5) | 4.9 (40.8) | −1.7 (28.9) | 13.0 (55.3) |
| Mean daily minimum °C (°F) | −7.7 (18.1) | −4.5 (23.9) | 1.8 (35.2) | 9.1 (48.4) | 15.2 (59.4) | 20.0 (68.0) | 23.1 (73.6) | 22.2 (72.0) | 16.6 (61.9) | 8.9 (48.0) | 0.8 (33.4) | −5.4 (22.3) | 8.3 (47.0) |
| Record low °C (°F) | −20.3 (−4.5) | −17.0 (1.4) | −10.0 (14.0) | −1.5 (29.3) | 5.5 (41.9) | 11.5 (52.7) | 15.6 (60.1) | 13.8 (56.8) | 3.7 (38.7) | −3.2 (26.2) | −11.0 (12.2) | −17.3 (0.9) | −20.3 (−4.5) |
| Average precipitation mm (inches) | 2.6 (0.10) | 4.5 (0.18) | 8.3 (0.33) | 22.0 (0.87) | 41.3 (1.63) | 95.1 (3.74) | 188.3 (7.41) | 145.9 (5.74) | 55.0 (2.17) | 29.9 (1.18) | 15.4 (0.61) | 2.9 (0.11) | 611.2 (24.07) |
| Average precipitation days (≥ 0.1 mm) | 1.5 | 2.0 | 2.9 | 4.6 | 6.3 | 10.3 | 12.6 | 10.2 | 6.9 | 4.7 | 3.3 | 2.0 | 67.3 |
| Average snowy days | 2.8 | 2.4 | 1.0 | 0.1 | 0 | 0 | 0 | 0 | 0 | 0 | 1.7 | 2.7 | 10.7 |
| Average relative humidity (%) | 49 | 46 | 43 | 45 | 50 | 61 | 73 | 73 | 67 | 61 | 57 | 51 | 56 |
| Mean monthly sunshine hours | 164.2 | 170.6 | 213.9 | 227.9 | 254.1 | 208.4 | 172.0 | 193.5 | 199.1 | 184.5 | 154.3 | 152.4 | 2,294.9 |
| Percentage possible sunshine | 55 | 56 | 57 | 57 | 57 | 47 | 38 | 46 | 54 | 54 | 52 | 53 | 52 |
Source: China Meteorological Administration

== See also ==
- Yulong Ski Resort
