= Huangya Pass =

Section of the Great Wall of China in Tianjin

- Huangyaguan
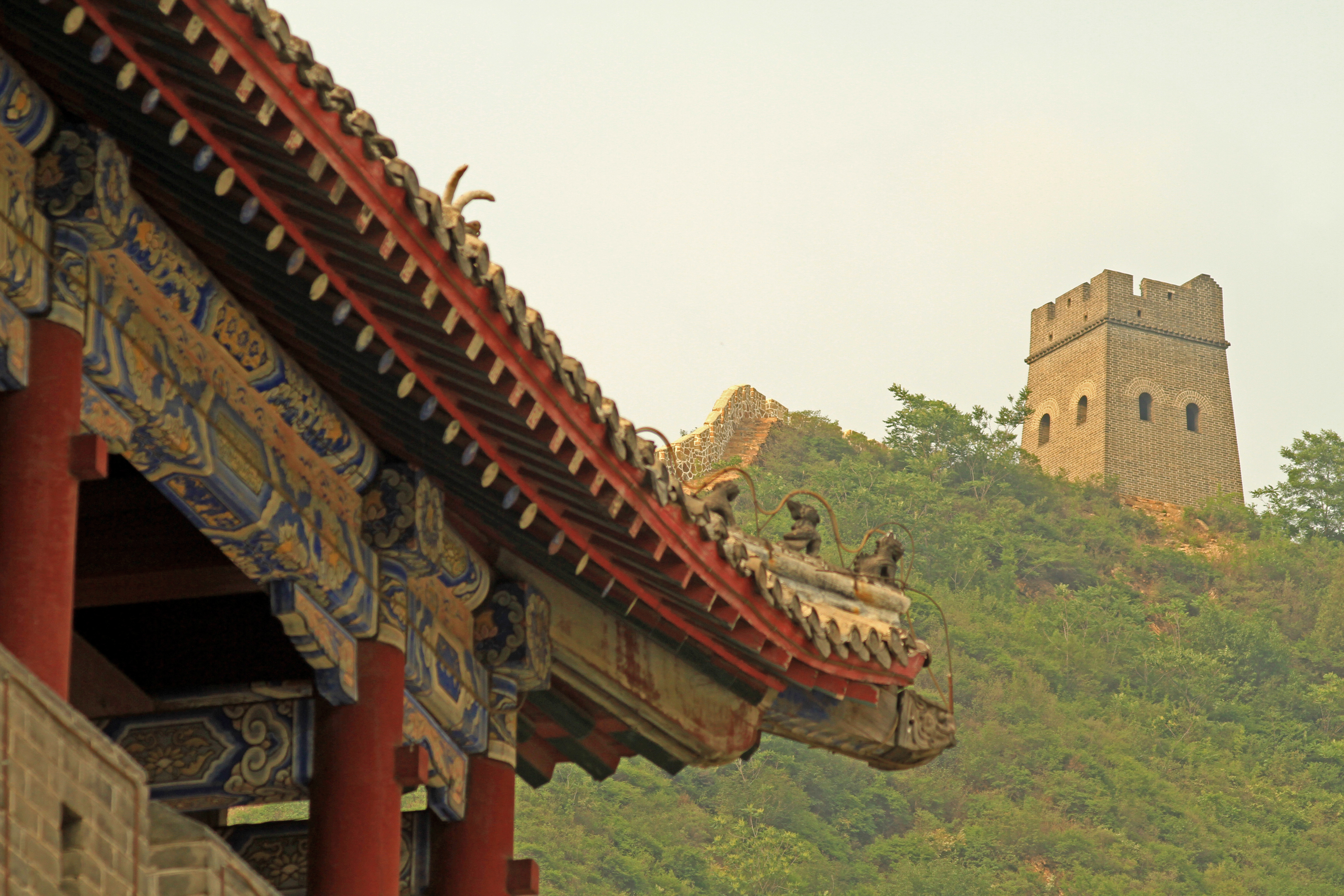

- Location within China

Third Approach
- Location: Tianjin near northern tripoint with Beijing and Hebei
- Range: Yan Mountains
- Coordinates: 40°13′56″N 117°24′22″E

Huangya Pass
- Traditional Chinese: 黃崖關
- Simplified Chinese: 黄崖关
Transcriptions
Standard Mandarin
- Hanyu Pinyin: Huángyáguān

Huangyaguan or Huangya Pass (simplified Chinese: 黄崖关; traditional Chinese: 黃崖關; pinyin: Huángyáguān; lit. 'Yellow Cliff Pass') is a small section of the Great Wall of China located in the north of Jizhou District, Tianjin municipality, approximately 78 miles (126 km) north of urban Tianjin city. The site lies on a steep and abrupt mountain ridge.

Huangyaguan was originally built over 1400 years ago in the Northern Qi dynasty and reinforced with brick walls during the Ming dynasty. In 1984, major repair work was performed on over 3 kilometres of the wall including on 20 water towers and 1 water pass. The pass is a major tourist attraction within Tianjin and was listed as a site of relics protection in 1986.
