= Mount Pan =

Mountain in Jizhou, Tianjin, China

- 盘山
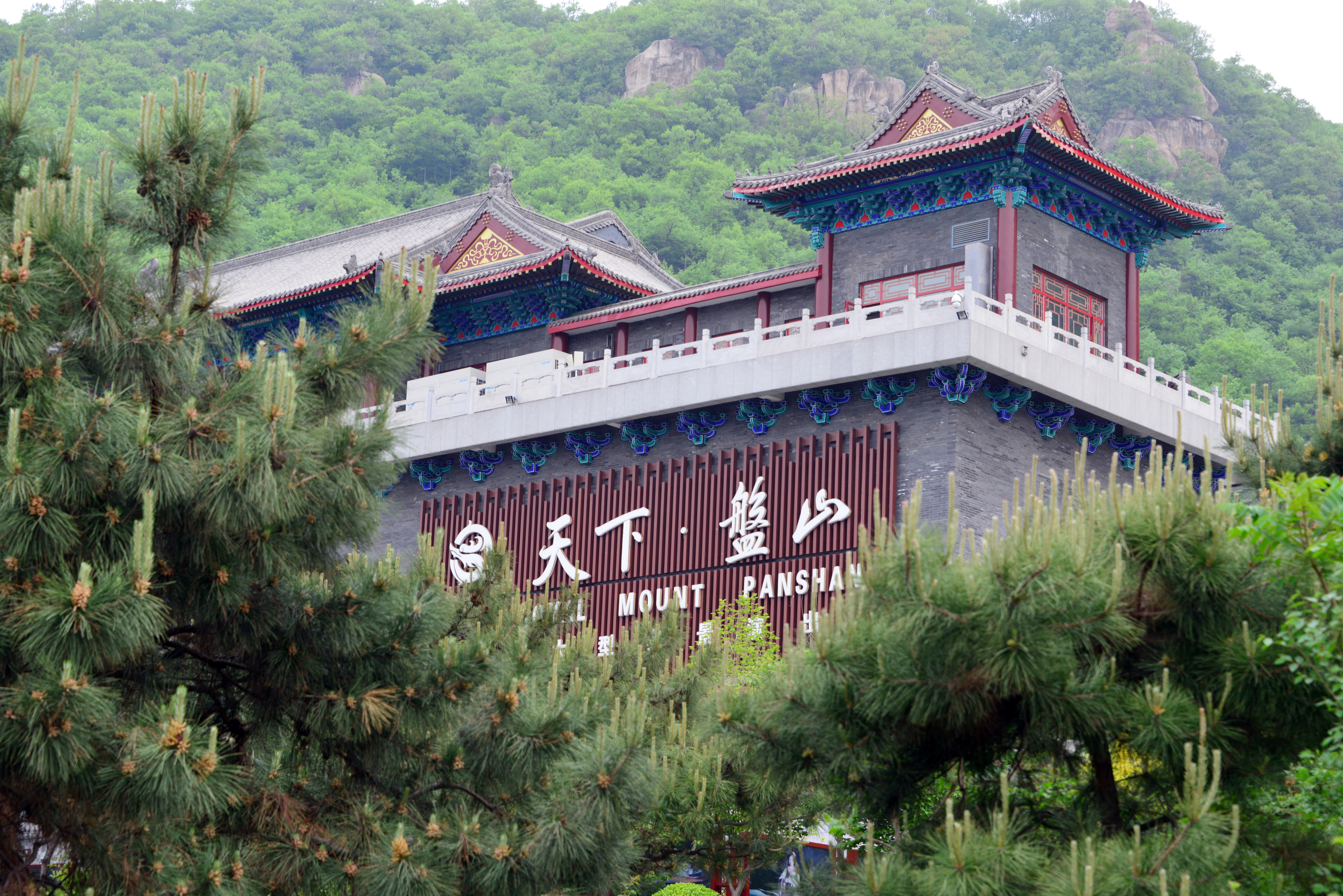

Highest point
- Elevation: 858 m (2,815 ft)
- Coordinates: 40°05′0″N 117°16′0″E

Geography
- Location within Northern China
- Location: Jizhou District, Tianjin, China

Mount Pan (simplified Chinese: 盘山; traditional Chinese: 盤山; pinyin: Pán Shān) is a mountain in Jizhou District, Tianjin, People's Republic of China. It is located 120 kilometres (75 mi) from Tianjin and 90 kilometres (56 mi) from Beijing. It has an area of 20 square kilometers and its highest peak is 858 meters above the sea level.
