= Huang (surname) =

- Romanization: Huáng (Mandarin); Hwang (Korean); Huỳnh, Hoàng (Vietnamese); Uong, Wong, Hwong (Fuzhounese); Ooi, Oei, Wee, Uy, Ng (Hokkien); Ng (Quanzhou Hokkien, Xiamen Hokkien); Ooi, Oei, Uy, Wee (Zhangzhou Hokkien, Xiamen Hokkien); Ng (Teochew); Waan (Shanghainese); Wong (Cantonese, Hakka); Vong (Macao Cantonese); Bong (Hakka); Wee (Hainanese)
- Pronunciation: Huáng (Mandarin Pinyin); Wong4 (Cantonese Jyutping); N̂g / Ûiⁿ (Hokkien Pe̍h-ōe-jī)
- Language: Chinese

Origin
- Meaning: Huang Kingdom or Yellow
- Region of origin: China

Other names
- Derivatives: Hutomo, Widodo, Wijaya, Widjaya, Widjaja, Winata, Witular, Wiyono (Chinese-Indonesian)

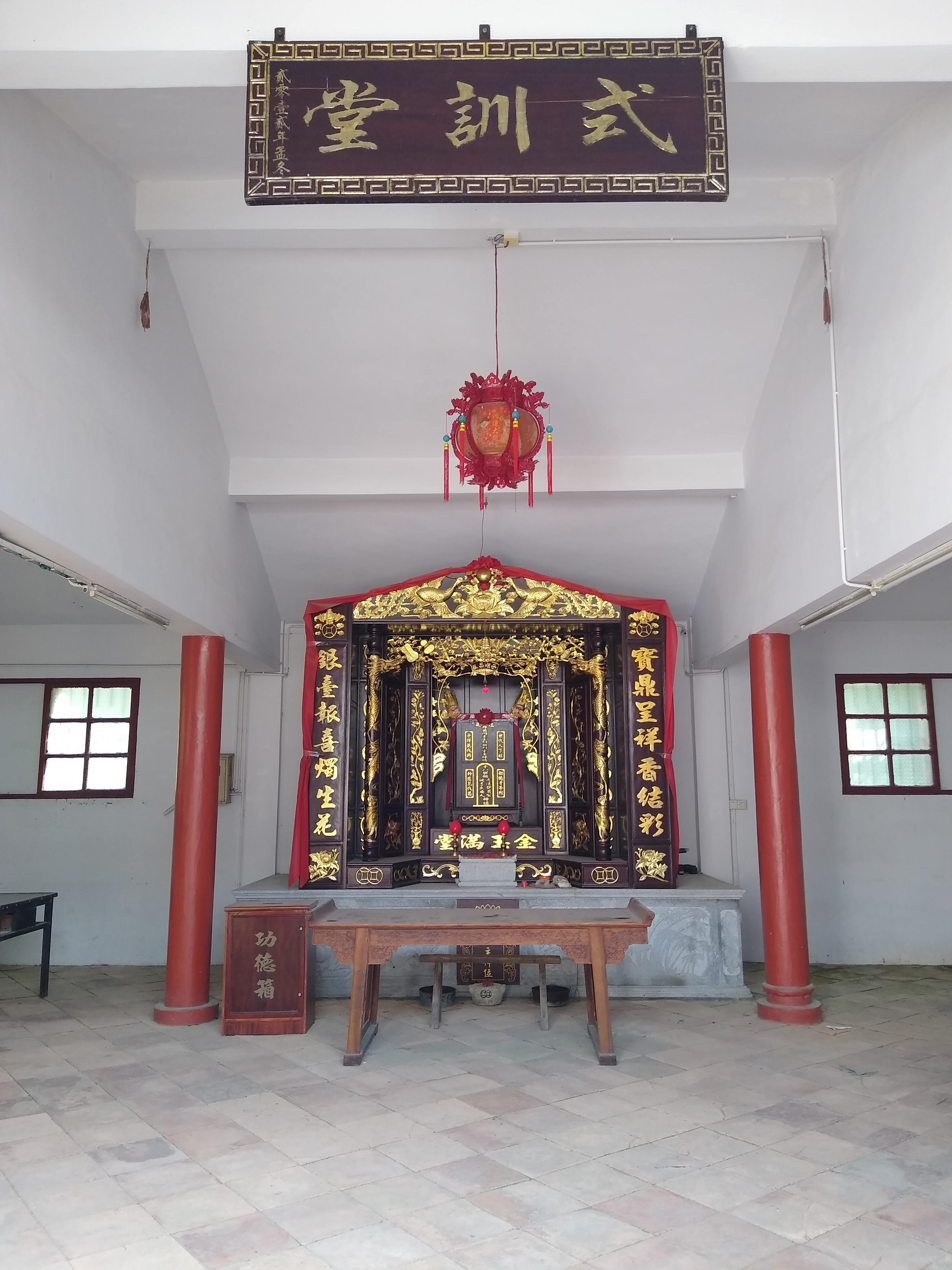
Ancestral Hall of the Huang Family in Majianglong, Kaiping, China

Huang (/ˈhwɑːŋ/; traditional Chinese: 黃; simplified Chinese: 黄) is a Chinese surname. While Huáng is the pinyin romanization of the word, it may also be romanized as Hwang, Wong, Waan, Wan, Waon, Hwong, Vong, Hung, Hong, Bong, Eng, Ng, Uy, Wee, Oi, Oei, Oey, Ooi, Ong, or Ung due to pronunciations of the word in different dialects and languages. It is the 96th name on the Hundred Family Surnames poem.

This surname is known as Hwang in Korean. In Vietnamese, the name is known as Hoàng or Huỳnh.

Huang is the 7th most common surname in China. Hoang/Huynh is the 5th most common surname in Vietnam. The population of Huangs in China and Taiwan was estimated at more than 35 million in 2020; it was also the surname of more than 2 million overseas Chinese, 5.7 million Vietnamese (6%), and an estimated 1 million Koreans (the 2015 census of South Korea revealed it was the surname for 697,171 South Koreans, ranked 16th).

Huang is also the pinyin romanization of the very rare surname 皇.

== Pronunciations/transliterations ==
- Huang (Chinese: 黃/皇) used in Mandarin
- Hwang (Korean: 황; Hanja: 黃/皇) used in Korean
- Huỳnh or Hoàng used in Vietnamese
  - Huỳnh is the cognate adopted in Southern and most parts of Central Vietnam because of a naming taboo decree banning the surname Hoàng, due to similarity between the surname and the name of Lord Nguyễn Hoàng
- Faaj or Fangx used in Hmong language
- Vangz used in Zhuang language
- Vong or Voòng used in Hakka, Ngái, and Taishanese
- Ng, Ung, Ong, Wee, Oi, Ooi or Uy, used in Southern Min, specifically the Hokkien- and Teochew-speaking Chinese diaspora in Southeast Asia
  - Ooi, Oei, Oey, Uy in Zhangzhou dialect and Xiamen dialect
  - Ng, Eng used in Quanzhou dialect, Xiamen dialect, and Teochew
  - Ng, Oey or Oei used in Indonesia and Australia
  - Ng, Uy, Wee is used in the Philippines
  - Ng, Ooi, Wee used in Singapore and Malaysia
    - Ooi used in Penang and nearby Malaysian states
- Wong, Vong or Hwong used in Cantonese, Wu and Fuzhou dialect
- Oeng, Eung, Ueng, Ung, or Ing (Khmer: អ៊ឹង) used in Cambodia
- Eung or Ueng (Thai: แซ่อึ้ง) used in Thailand (often paired with the prefix 'Sae' (แซ่) to indicate surname.

== Origins ==
Huang is an ancient surname. According to tradition, there are several different origins of the surname, for example as descendants of Bo Yi, Lu Zhong (陸終) or Tai Tai (臺駘). There were also at least three Huang Kingdoms during the Xia, Shang and Zhou dynasties. Most of the people with the surname Huang could track back their ancestors to one of the Huang Kingdoms.

=== Dong Yi Tribe 東夷 ===
The Dongyi or Eastern Barbarians were ancient people who lived in eastern China during the prehistoric period. They were one of the Four Barbarians in Chinese culture, along with the Northern Di 北狄, the Southern Man 南蠻, and the Western Rong 西戎. The Dong Yi tribe was the tribal alliance group that consisted of nine tribes in the Huai River Basin 淮水流域: Quan Yi 畎夷, Yu Yi 於夷, Fang Yi 方夷, Huang Yi 黃夷, Bai Yi 白夷, Chi Yi 赤夷, Xuan Yi 玄夷, Feng Yi 風夷 and Yang Yi 陽夷. The Dong Yi tribe people used different birds as their totems and for Huang Yi 黃夷 tribe, Yellow Oriole 黃鶯 was the totem. Later when the people from Huang Yi 黃夷 tribe moved and settled in different parts of China, they adopted Huang 黃 as their surname.

=== Ying Clan 嬴姓 ===
Shaohao 少皋 had a son, Gao Yao and Gao Yao had a son, Bo Yi. Bo Yi helped Emperor Shun and Yu the Great control the Great Flood and got surname Ying (嬴) at early Xia dynasty period. Bo Yi married Emperor Shun's youngest daughter and had three sons (some accounts mentioned only two sons – Da Lian and Ruo Mu):

- Eldest Son Da Lian 大廉 – Founder of Huang Kingdom 黃國 (Qin Kingdom Founder Fei Zi 非子 and Zhao Kingdom Founder Shu Dai 叔帶 were descendants of Da Lian)
- Second Son Ruo Mu 若木 – Founder of Xu Kingdom 徐國 (his great-great-grandson Fei Chang 費昌 founded Fei Kingdom 費國)
- Third Son En Cheng 恩成 – Founder of Jiang Kingdom 江國

Xia Yu awarded the Huang kingdom to Da Lian, and his descendants are known as the Huangs. There are total of 14 clans derived from Bo Yi Ying Clan: Lian (廉), Xu (徐), Jiang (江), Qin (秦), Zhao (趙), Huang (黃), Liang (梁), Ma (馬), Ge (葛), Gu (谷), Miao (繆), Zhong (鍾), Fei (費), and Qu (瞿). Rulers of Qin Kingdom, Zhao Kingdom, Qin dynasty and Song dynasty could trace back their ancestor to Bo Yi. Hata Clan (秦氏) of Japan, and Aisin Gioro Clan, Irgen Gioro Clan and Gioro Clan of Manchuria (one of several different opinions) were also derived from Bo Yi Ying Clan.

=== Ji Clan 姬姓 ===
The lineage of Huang Clan from the Yellow Emperor is as follows: 1) Yellow Emperor 黃帝 -> 2) Chang Yi 昌意 -> 3) Zhuanxu Emperor 顓頊帝 -> 4) Da Ye 大業 (aka Ye the Great) -> 5) Shao Dian 少典 -> 6) Nu Shen 女莘 -> 7) Da Fei 大費 (aka Fei the Great) -> 8) Juan Zhang 卷章 -> 9) Wu Hui 吳回 (also known as Zhurong) -> 10) Lu Zhong 陸終 -> 11) Hui Lian 惠連 (Some accounts state that Hui Lian is son of Fan Ren, son of Lu Zhong). Lu Zhong had six sons:

- Eldest Son Fan 樊 (also known as Fan Ren 樊人 or Kun Wu 昆吾) – Legendary Pottery Inventor and Founder of Kunwu 昆吾國,
- Second Son Ding 定 (also known as Hui Lian 惠连 or Can Hu 參胡) – Founder of Huang 黃國,
- Third Son Qian (also known as Qian Keng 钱铿) – Legendary God of Longevity and Founder of Da Peng 大彭國,
- Fourth Son Qiu 求 (also known as Qiu Yan 求言 or Kuai Ren 鄶人)- Founder of Kuai 鄶國,
- Fifth Son Yan An 晏安 (also known as Cao An 曹安 or Zao An 遭安) – Founder of Zhu 邾國, and
- Sixth Son Ji 季 (also known as Ji Lian 季连) – Founder of Chu 楚國.

In 2220 BC during the reign of Emperor Yao 帝堯, Hui Lian 惠連 scored merits in harnessing river floods. Emperor Yao conferred on Hui Lian the title of Viscount 子 (but the nobility system of ancient China is still not clear) and the state of Can'hu 參胡 (in present-day region of Fenyang, Shanxi province). Emperor Yao renamed Can'hu as State of Huang, and bestowed on Hui Lian the surname Huang 黃 and the name "Yun" 雲. Hence, Hui Lian was also known as Huang Yun 黃雲 or Nan Lu 南陆. Hui Lian became the Progenitor of the Huang surname clan. During Western Zhou dynasty, the rulers of the Huang State was given the title of Duke 公. The descendants of Huang Yun (Hui Lian) ruled the Huang State of Shanxi until the early Spring and Autumn period (722 BC-481 BC) when it was conquered by the State of Jin.

Another lineage of Huang Clan from the Yellow Emperor is as follows: 1) Yellow Emperor 黃帝 -> 2) Shao Hao 少昊 -> 3) Jiao Ji 嬌極 -> 4) Hui Gong 揮公 -> 5) Mei 昧 -> 6) Tai Tai 臺駘. Tai Tai helped Zhuanxu, and he and his descendants (Jin Tian Clan 金天氏) were enfeoffed with Fen Zhou 汾州 at Fen River 汾河 which was further divided into four kingdoms – Huang Kingdom 黃國, Shen Kingdom 沈國, Ru Kingdom 蓐國 and Si Kingdom 姒國.

=== Development and emigration ===
In 891 BC King Xiao of Zhou conferred on the 53rd generation descendant of Hui Lian, Huang Xi 黃熙 (aka Huang Shi 黃石) the nobility of 'Hou' 侯 (marquis) and a fiefdom in the region east of the Han river 漢水 (in present-day region of Yicheng, Hubei province) called 'Huang' 黃 (Not to be confused with the Huang State of Fenyang, Shanxi) with the four states Jiang 江, Huang 黃 (founded by 伯益 Bo Yi's descendants), Dao 道, and Bo 柏 in the Huang river 潢水 valley as vassals. The Huang State of Yicheng, Hubei was known as the Western Huang (Xi Huang 西黃) in history.

During the Jin dynasty (266–420), when northern China was invaded by the barbarian tribes, many northerners (especially the aristocratic clans) moved to south China with the Jin court. It was during this period that the Huang clansmen migrated to Fujian.

According to Min Shu 閩書 (Book of Min) (Quoted from Chung Yoon-Ngan): "During the second year (of the reign) of Yongjia (308AD) the Central Plain was in chaos and the eight clans:- Lin 林, Huang 黃, Chen 陳, Zheng 鄭, Zhan 詹, Qiu 邱, He 何, and Hu 胡, entered Min 閩 (present day Fujian province, China)."

From the Tang dynasty (618–907) onwards, many Han Chinese migrated from Fujian to Guangdong and the other southern provinces. Huang grew into a big clan in south China . The Cantonese Baiyue adopted Huang surname as well.

Huang migration overseas began as early as the 14th century during the Ming dynasty to destinations in Southeast Asia. Migration to Americas began only in the mid-19th century following the forced opening of China's doors to the West. Huang is one of the largest Chinese surname clans in Americas today. The population of overseas Huang Clansmen was estimated at 2 million in 2000.

The surname 皇 has several origins:

1. The descendants of the Three Emperors of ancient China.
2. The descendants of Duke Dai of Song's prince named Huangfu Chongshi 皇父充石.
3. An ancient book Xing Kao 姓考 says Zheng Kingdom has a royal clan named Huang clan 皇氏.

Across Guangdong, three million people surnamed Huang claim descent from the same paternal ancestor, Huang Qiaoshan who lived in the Tang dynasty and migrated to Fujian at the end of the dynasty, via three of his sons (out of 21) who founded different branches, found among the Hakka, Chaoshan and Cantonese. Among them are the Longgang, Kengxi village Hakka Huang, the Cantonese "guangfu" Huang native to Shenzhen in the villages of Shangsha & Xiasha & the Chaoshan Huang. Huang Qiaoshan lived from 872 to 953 and claimed he was the Yellow Emperor's 128th generation descendant. Huang Moutang who was born in 1183 and was Huang Qiaoshan's 15th generation descendant is the ancestor of the Cantonese guangfu Huang clans. One of his descendants was Huang Siming from whom the Xiasha Huang descent. Huang Qiaoshan's 9th generation descendant Huang Liao was a Song official and his descendant Huang Chaoxuan during the Ming-Qing transition was the ancestor of the Longgang, Kengzi village Hakka Huang. The Huang descendants who migrated and established linages in the Song were Cantonese speakers while the Huang descendants who migrated to the coast in the Ming-Qing transition spoke Hakka.

== Huang ==
Huang is the 7th most common surname in China, and the 3rd most common surname in Taiwan. It is also one of the common surnames among Zhuang people, the largest ethnic minority in China, and is also the most common surname in the Guangxi Zhuang Autonomous Region. 19% of people from China with Surname Huang live in Guangdong Province. The population of people named Huang in China was approximately 29 million and in Taiwan about 1.4 million. In 2019 Huang was again the seventh most common surname in mainland China.

A 2013 study found that it was the seventh-most common surname, shared by 32,600,000 people or 2.450% of the population, with the province having the most people being Guangdong.

=== Historical figures ===
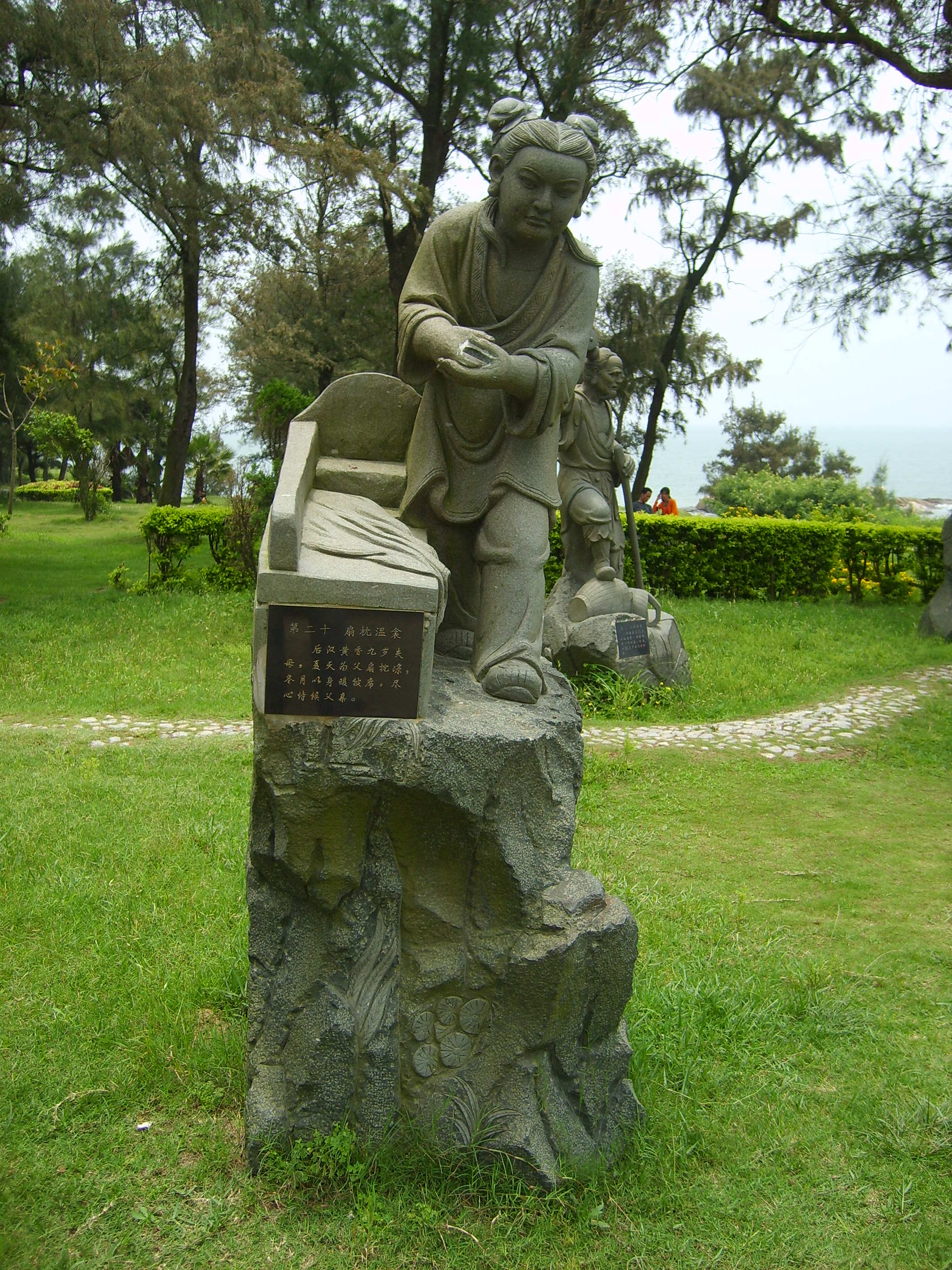
Eastern Han dynasty Filial Son and Prime Minister Huang Xiang

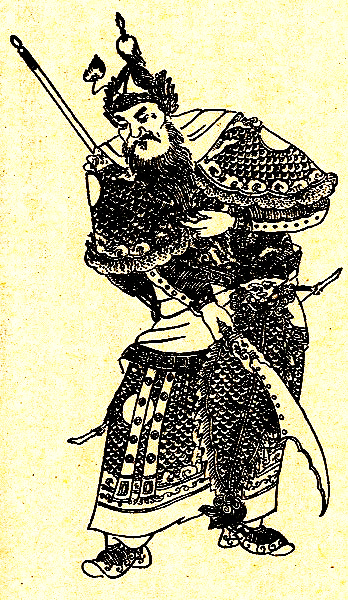
Shu Han Kingdom General Huang Zhong

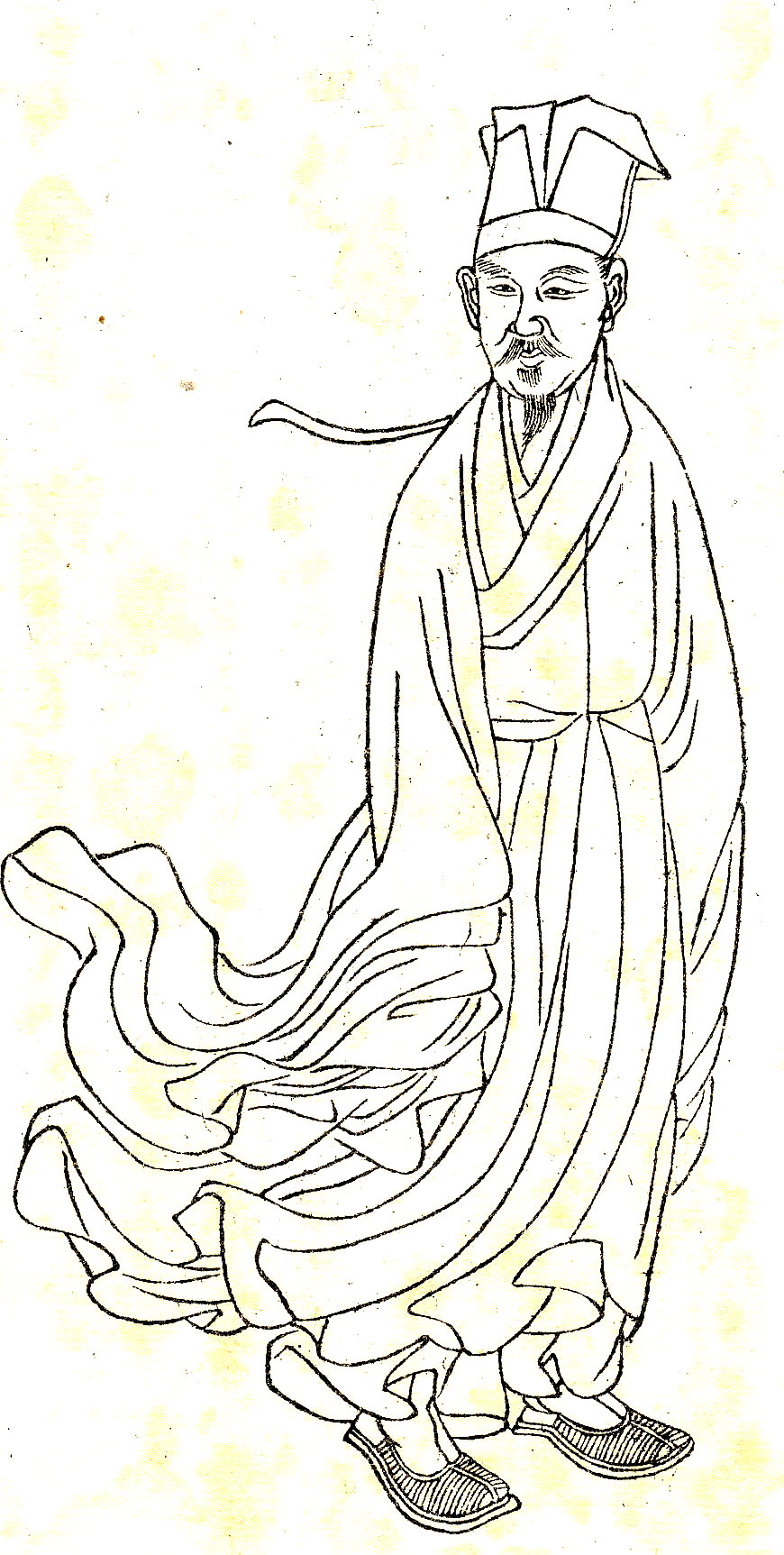
Song dynasty Calligrapher and Filial Son Huang Tingjian

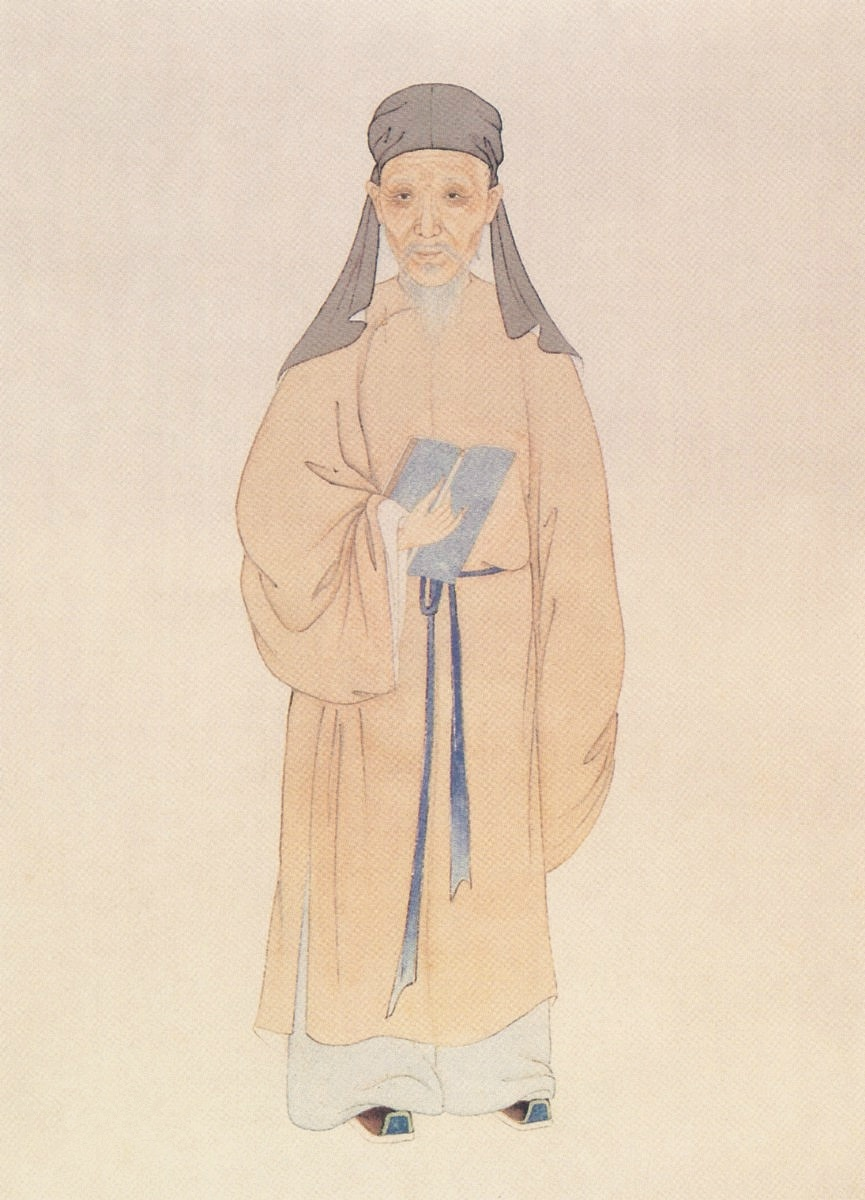
Late Ming dynasty Philosopher Huang Zongxi

- Huang Chao 黃巢 (820–884), leader of the Huang Chao rebellion against the Tang dynasty
- Huang Cheng Yan 黃承彥, Eastern Han dynasty scholar
- Huang Dao Po 黃道婆 (1245–1330), Yuan dynasty Weaver and innovator
- Huang Dao Zhou 黃道週 (1585–1646), Ming dynasty calligrapher and politician named as one of the Four Lords of the Yellow Gate (黃門四君子)
- Huang Ding 黃鼎 (1650–1730), Qing dynasty landscape painter and poet
- Wong Fei Hung 黃飛鴻 (1847–1924), Martial artist, physician, acupuncturist, revolutionary, and folk hero during late Qing dynasty
- Wong Kim Ark 黃金德 (c. 1868/73 – after 1931), Chinese American who was the subject of a landmark US Supreme Court citizenship case
- Huang Gai 黃蓋, Eastern Wu general and one of the "Twelve Tiger Generals of Jiangdong" (江東十二虎臣) during the Three Kingdoms period
- Huang Gong Wang 黃公望 (1269–1345), painter and one of the "Four Masters of the Yuan dynasty"
- Huang Ji 黃濟, Ming dynasty imperial painter
- Huang Quan 黃權 (?–240), general of Shu Han and later of Cao Wei during the Three Kingdoms period
- Huang Ru Heng 黃汝亨 (1558–1626), calligrapher during late Ming dynasty
- Huang Shen 黃慎 (1687–1772), Qing dynasty painter and artistic innovator who was one of the "Eight Eccentrics of Yangzhou"
- Ong Sum Ping 黃森屏 Huang Senping, Noble of Brunei. Street Name in Brunei Capital of Bandar Seri Begawan Jalan Ong Sum Ping (only street in Brunei with Chinese name) was named after him
- Huang Ting Jian 黃庭堅 (1045–1105), Song dynasty noted filial son, poet, scholar, magistrate, and calligrapher. One of the "Song Four" (宋四家) and one of the "Four Scholar of Su'men" (蘇門四學士)
- Huang Xie 黃歇 (314 BC–238 BC), Lord Chunshen, Prime Minister of the state of Chu during the Warring States period and one of the famous "Four Lords of the Warring States"
- Huang Zhong 黃忠 (?–220), Shu Han Kingdom General during the Three Kingdoms period and one of the "Five Tiger Generals" under Liu Bei
- Huang Zong Xi 黃宗羲 (1610–1695), Ming-Qing dynasties naturalist, political theorist, philosopher, historian and educator, one of the famous "Eastern Zhe'jiang Three Huangs" (浙東三黃), one of the "Four Worthies of Yu'yao" (餘姚四賢) and one of the "Early Qing Five Grandmasters" (清初五大師)
- Huang Zun Xian 黃遵憲 (1848–1905), Late Qing dynasty scholar, poet, educator, diplomat and statesman

=== Modern figures ===
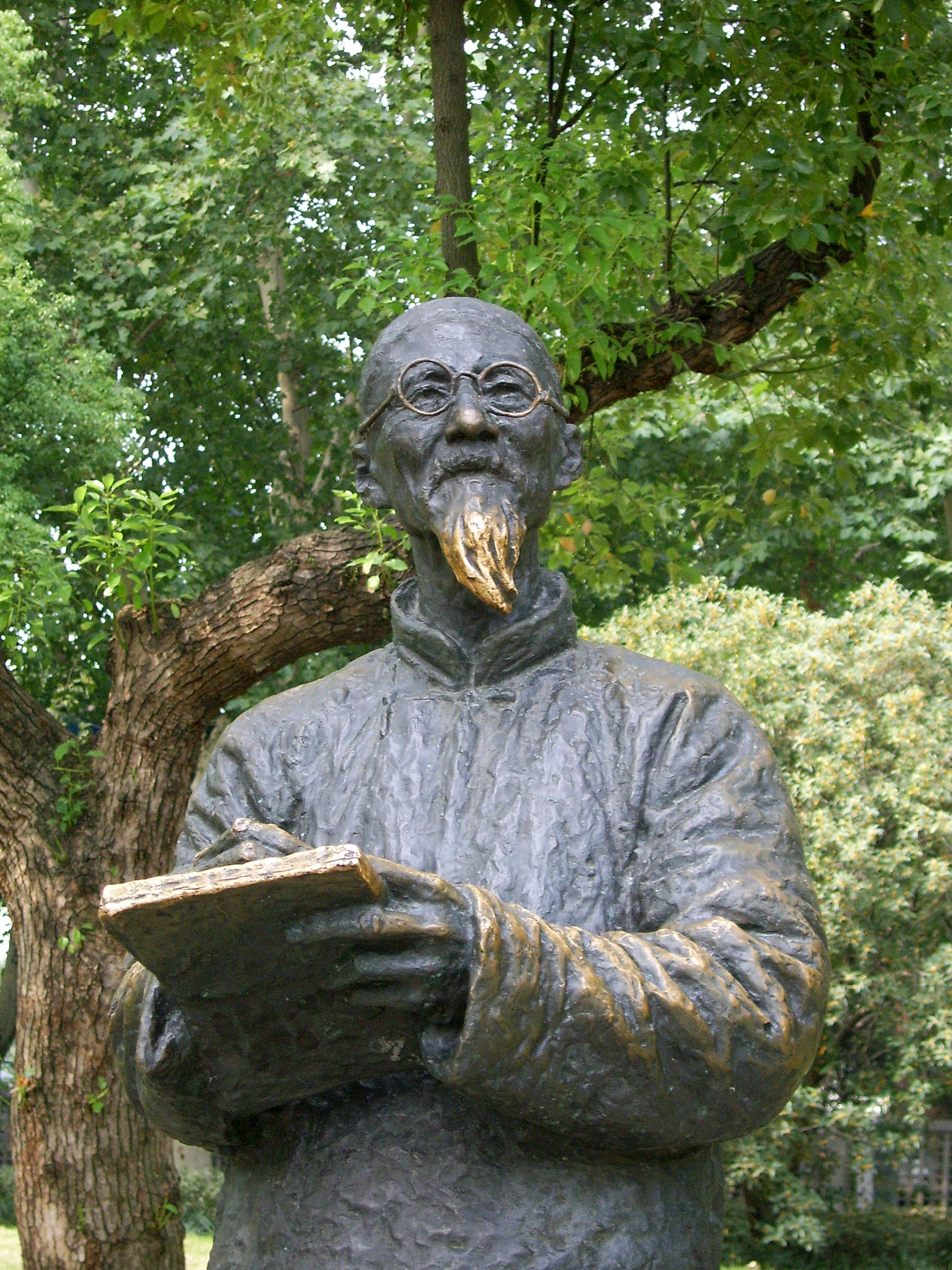
Chinese Art Historian Huang Binhong

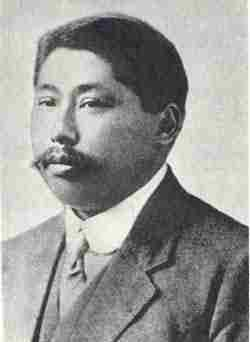
Chinese Revolutionary Huang Xing

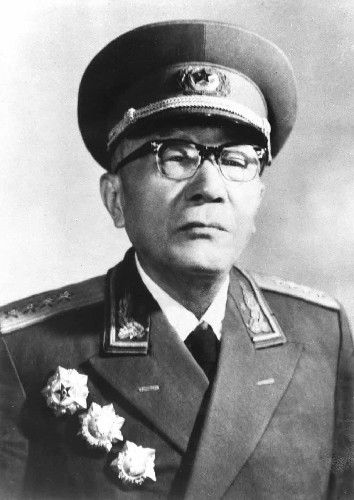
Senior General of PLA Huang Kecheng

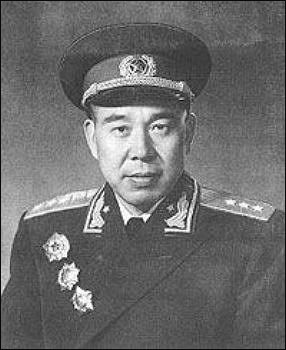
General Huang Yongsheng

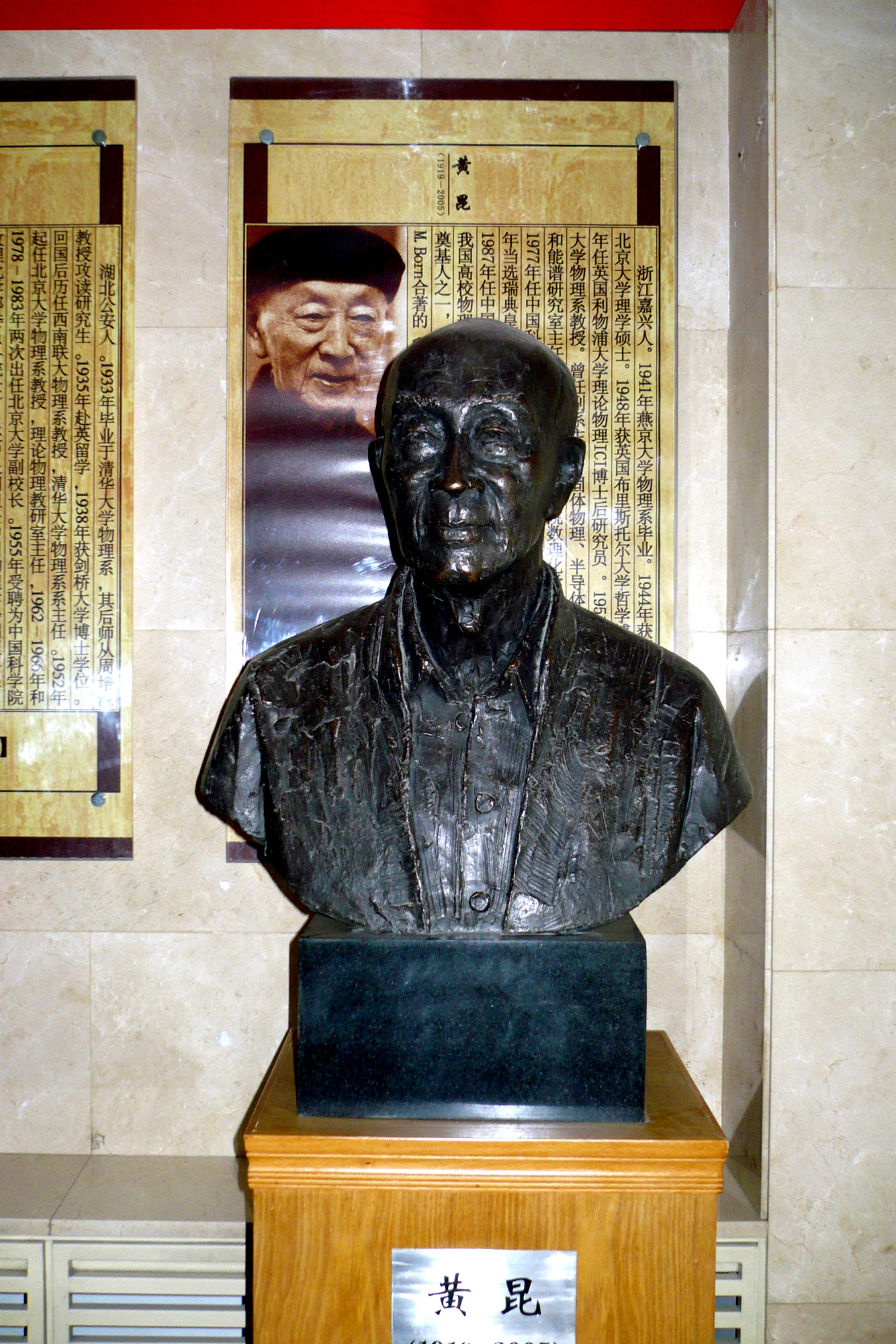
Bronze Bust of Physicist Huang Kun

- Huang Baitao 黃百韬 (1900–1948), Chinese Nationalist General active in the Second Sino-Japanese War and Chinese Civil War, for which he was twice awarded the Order of Blue Sky and White Sun, the highest honor a Chinese commander can achieve
- Huang Bamei 黃八妹 (1906–1982), Chinese pirate and naval commander
- Huang Binhong 黃宾虹 (1865–1955), Chinese art historian and Literati painter
- Wong Che Yin 黃志贤 (born 1959), businessman and philanthropist from Hong Kong, and founder and chairman of Kong Fung International Group
- Huang Chieh 黃杰 (1902–1995), Kuomintang General and Minister of Defense of the Republic of China
- Huang Chih-hsien 黃智賢 (born in 1964), Taiwanese TV commentator, author and host on CTV and CTITV between 2014 and 2019
- Huang Chin-Lung 黃進龍 (born 1963-), Taiwanese painter and professor
- Huang Chun-ming 黃春明 (born 1935), Taiwanese literary figure and teacher
- Huang Daren 黃达人 (born 1945), Chinese mathematician
- Huang Dao 黃道 (1900–1939), Chinese Workers' and Peasants' Red Army and the New Fourth Army General and Martyr active during the Anti-Japanese War
- Huang Enru 黄恩茹 (born 1997), Chinese singer, actress, and member of the idol group BEJ48
- Huang Fu 黃郛 (1883–1936), Former Premier and Acting President of Republic of China
- Huang Guangyu 黃光裕 (born 1969), Chinese billionaire
- Huang Guoxian 黃国显 (born 1962), Lieutenant General of the People's Liberation Army Air Force (PLAAF) of China and Commander of the Nanjing Military Region Air Force
- Huang Hengmei 黃恒美 (born 1940), Lieutenant General of the People's Liberation Army Air Force (PLAAF) of China and Commander of the Chengdu Military Region Air Force and the Lanzhou Military Region Air Force
- Huang Hongjia 黃宏嘉 (1924–2021), Chinese Academician of Science in Microwave Theory and Optical Fibre
- Huang Hsin-Wei 黃信維, commonly written as Hwang Shinwei and sometimes as Huang Xinwei, Taiwanese video game programmer
- Huang Huahua 黃华华 (born 1946), Former Governor of Guangdong Province, China
- Huang Jianxiang 黃健翔 (born 1968), renowned sports commentator in China
- Huang Jian Xin 黃建新 (born 1954), Chinese film director and film producer
- Huang Jiguang 黃继光 (1931–1952), highly decorated Chinese soldier during the Korean War
- Yinrun Huang, Chinese influencer living in Yorkshire
- Huang Ju 黃菊 (1938–2007), Former Vice Premier of China
- Wong Jumsum 黃沾, also known as James Wong Jim (1940–2004), Renowned Lyricist, Writer and one of the "Four Talent of Hong Kong" 香港四大才子
- Cary and Michael Huang (or Huang twins), YouTubers, voice actors and animators who created the web tool The Scale of the Universe, its sequel, and the web series Battle for Dream Island
- Huang Kan 黃侃 (1886–1935), Early Republic of China period Chinese philologist, revolutionary and one of the Sinology experts known as "Seven Accomplished of Jiang'nan" 江南七彥. Together with famous Literary Figure Li Lianggong 李亮工, he is also known as "Southern Huang and Northern Li" 南黃北李.
- Huang Kecheng 黃克诚 (1902–1986), Chinese military strategist, senior General, founding General of the People's Liberation Army and former head of People's Liberation Army General Staff Department
- Huang Kun 黃昆 (1919–2005), physicist in solid-state physics. The Born–Huang approximation is partially named after him
- Huang Kunming 黃坤明 (born 1956), Head of the Propaganda Department of the Chinese Communist Party and a member of the Politburo of the Chinese Communist Party
- Huang Mao Zong 黃茂榮 (1944–2025), Taiwanese judge, justice of the Judicial Yuan
- Huang Meng Fu 黃孟复 (born 1944), Vice Chairman of the China People's Political Consultative Conference and Chairman of the All-China Federation of Industry and Commerce
- Huang Min-hui 黃敏惠 (born 1959), former Acting Chairperson and current vice-chairperson of Kuomintang Party, and Mayor of Chiayi City of the Republic of China
- Huang Min Lon 黃鸣龙 (1898–1979), Chinese organic chemist and pharmaceutical scientist; Pioneer and founder of modern pharmaceutical industries in China. The "Huang Modification" or "Huang-Minlon Modification" is named after Huang Minglon. It was the first time that a Chinese name appeared in an organic chemical reaction
- Huang Ming 黃鸣 (born 1958), Chinese solar energy researcher and entrepreneur
- Huang Minghao 黃明昊, also known as Justin (born 2002), rapper and dancer of the C-pop group NEXT and Nine Percent
- Huang Na 黄娜 (1996–2004), Chinese student studying in Singapore and murder victim
- Wong Ngok Tai 黃岳泰, also known as Arthur Wong (born 1956), Nine time Hong Kong Film Awards-winning Cinematographer, Actor, Screenwriter, Film producer and film director
- Huang Nubo 黃怒波 (born 1956), Chinese real estate developer, entrepreneur, poet and billionaire
- Wong Pik Wan 黃碧雲 or Helena Wong (born 1959), Hong Kong legislative council member
- Huang Ren Jun 黄仁俊 (born 2000), Singer and dancer based in South Korea and member of K-pop boy group NCT Dream
- Huang Rulun 黃如论, Chinese real estate developer, philanthropist and billionaire
- Huang Shaoqiang 黃少強 (1901–1942), painter
- Huang Sheng-shyan 黃性贤 (1910–1992), kung fu and tai chi practitioner
- Huang Shengyi 黃圣依 (born 1983), Chinese actress
- Huang Shu-kuang 黃曙光 (born 1957), Republic of China Navy Admiral, Commander of Navy and Chief of the General Staff
- Wong Shun Leung 黃淳梁 (1935–1997), Chinese martial artist in Wing Chun Kung Fu
- Huang Shuxian 黃树贤 (born 1954), Minister of Civil Affairs, Former Minister of Supervision and Deputy Secretary of the Central Commission for Discipline Inspection of the People's Republic of China
- Huang Tingting 黄婷婷 (born 1992), Chinese singer and member of the idol group SNH48
- Wong Tze Wah 黃子華 or Dayo Wong (born 1960), Hong Kong stand-up comedian, actor, presenter, screenwriter, and singer-songwriter who is the pioneer of stand-up comedy in Hong Kong
- Huang Tzu 黃自 (1904–1938), Chinese musician of the early 20th century
- Wong Wang Fat 黃宏发 or Andrew Wong (born 1943), Last President of the Legislative Council of Hong Kong during British rule and the only person of Chinese ethnicity to have served in the position during British rule
- Huang Wei 黄伟 (born 1959), Chinese real estate developer and billionaire
- Huang Wei 黄薇 (born 1964), Chinese actress and television presenter
- Huang Weilu 黃緯祿 (1916–2011), One of China's pioneer missile scientists, one of the "Four Elders of China's Aerospace" and Winner of "Two Bombs, One Satellite" Award
- Huang Xianzhong 黃獻中 (born 1947), General in the People's Liberation Army (PLA) of the People's Republic of China, and Current Political Commissar of the PLA Shenyang Military Region
- Huang Xiaojing 黃小晶 (born 1946), Former Governor of Fujian Province, China
- Huang Xiaoming 黄晓明 (born 1977), Chinese actor
- Huang Xing 黃興 (1874–1916), Chinese revolutionary leader, militarist, and statesman, and the First Army Commander-in-chief of the Republic of China
- Huang Xingguo 黃興國 (born 1954), Mayor of Tianjin, China
- Huang Xinrui 黃新瑞, better known as John "Buffalo" Huang (1914–1941), ace fighter pilot; original contingent of American volunteer combat aviators joining the Chinese Air Force during the War of Resistance/WWII
- Huang Xuhua 黃旭華, One of the chief designers for China's first generation of nuclear submarines
- Huang Yanpei 黃炎培 (1878–1965), Chinese educator, industrialist, politician, founding pioneer of the China Democratic League, former Minister of Education of the Early Republic of China and Deputy Prime Minister of early People's Republic of China
- Huang Yongsheng 黃永勝 (1910–1983), Founding General of the People's Liberation Army, Former Commander of the Guangzhou Military Region and former head of People's Liberation Army General Staff Department
- Huang Yuanyong 黃遠庸 (1885–1915), Renowned Chinese Author and Journalist during the late Qing dynasty and early Republic of China
- Wong Yuk Hei 黃旭熙, also known as Lucas (born 1999), Chinese rapper based in South Korea and former member of K-pop boy group NCT
- Huang Zhang 黃章, also known as Jack Wong (born 1976), Chinese entrepreneur, founder and former CEO of Meizu
- Huang Zhen 黄镇 (1909–1989), Former Minister of Culture and former Vice Minister of Foreign Affairs of People's Republic of China
- Huang Zhendong 黄镇东 (born 1941), Former Minister of Transport and Communist Party Secretary of Chongqing of the People's Republic of China
- Huang Zhiqian 黃志千 (1914–1965), Chinese aircraft designer
- Huang Zhun (composer) 黃準 (1926–2024), Chinese composer
- Huang Zhun (footballer) 黄准 (born 1989), Chinese footballer
- Huang Zitao 黄子韬, also known as Tao (born 1993), Chinese rapper, singer and former member of the Chinese-South Korean boy band Exo
- Wong Ka Kui 黄家驹, also known as Koma Wong (1962–1993), Hong Kong singer and former lead singer of the rock band Beyond.

=== Modern figures (Overseas Chinese) ===
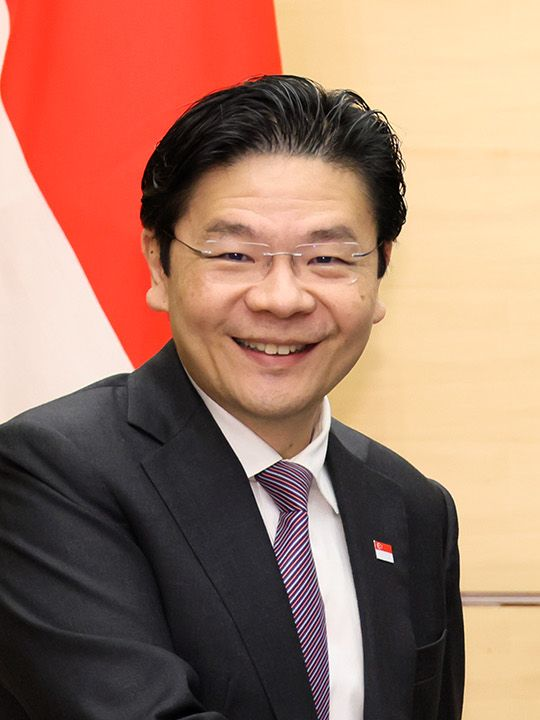
Prime Minister of Singapore, Lawrence Wong

Thai Economist, Puey Ungphakorn

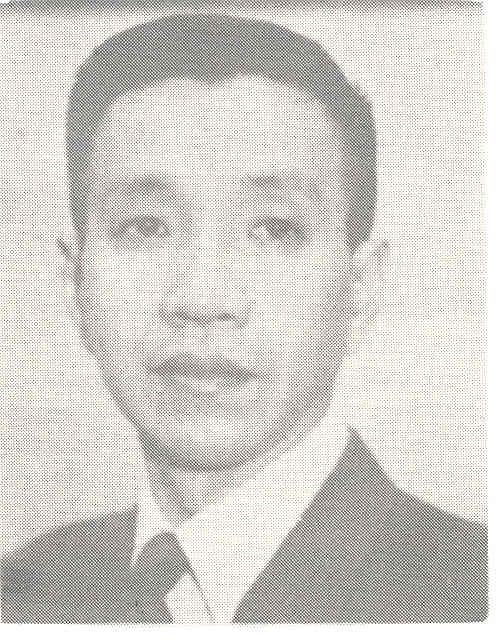
Former Minister of State of Indonesia, Oei Tjoe Tat

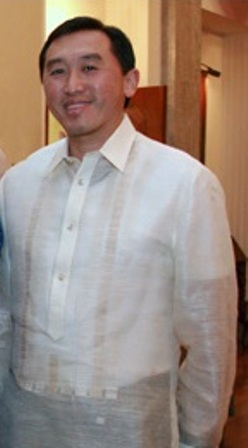
Former Secretary of Agriculture of the Philippines, Arthur C. Yap

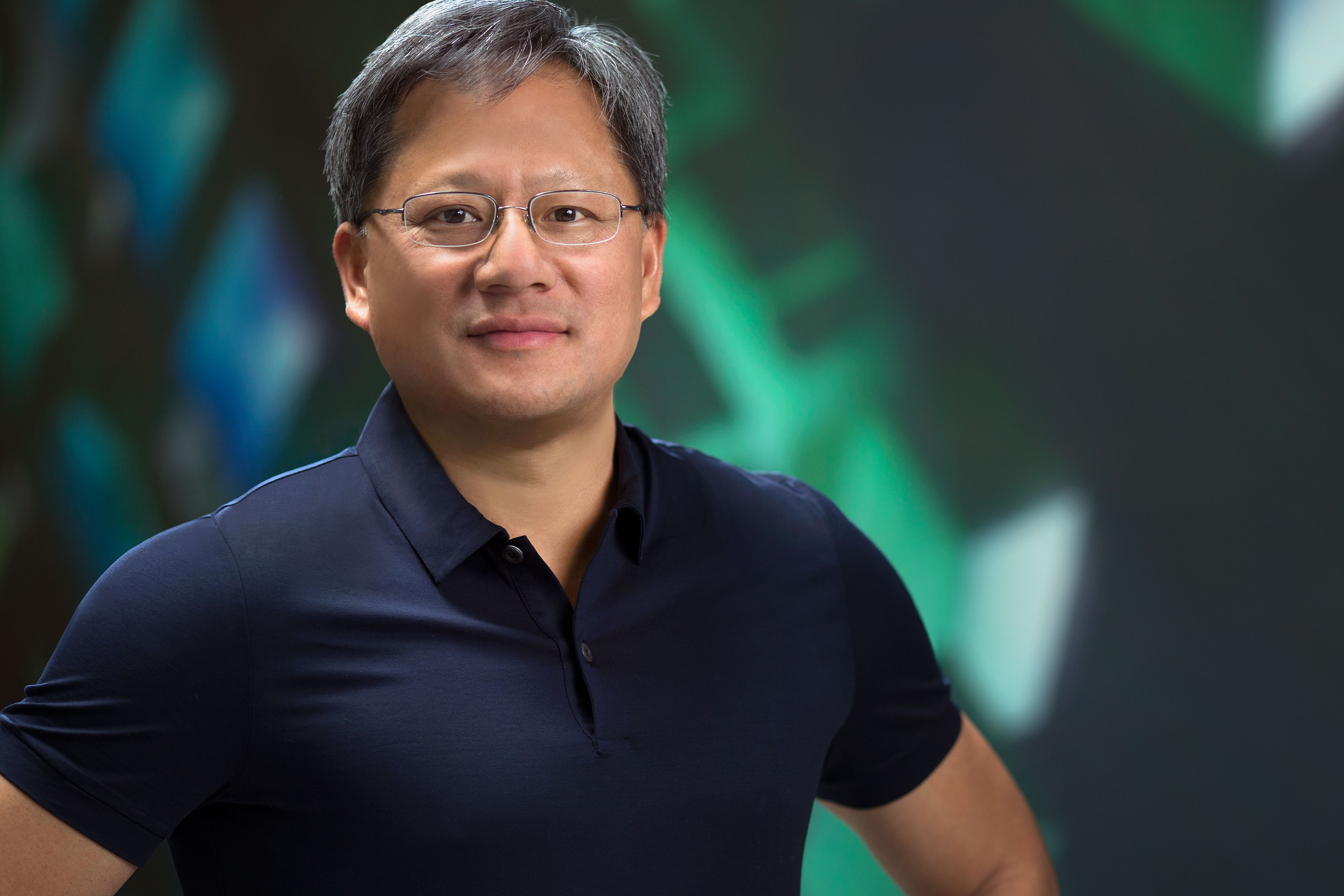
Taiwanese American Billionaire, Jensen Huang

- Wong Ah Fook 黄亚福 (1837–1918), Malaysian Chinese entrepreneur, and philanthropist who left an indelible imprint on the state of Johor in present-day Malaysia
- Huang Bi Ren 黄碧仁 (born 1969), Singaporean actress
- Huang Bing Yao 黄炳耀, also known as Benjamin Wong Tape (1875–1967), Chinese New Zealand merchant
- Anthony Wong Chau Sang 黃秋生 (born 1961), Hong Kong actor, singer and filmmaker
- Ng Chee Khern 黄志勤 (born 1965), Singaporean Major General, Former Chief of the Republic of Singapore Air Force and Permanent Secretary (Defence Development) in Singapore's Ministry of Defence
- Ng Chee Meng 黄志明 (born 1968), Singaporean union leader and politician, former lieutenant-general of Chief of Defence Force
- Ng Chee Peng 黄志平 (born 1970), Singaporean Naval Admiral and Former Chief of the Republic of Singapore Navy
- Ng Chee Siong 黄志祥 or Robert Ng (born 1952), Chairman of Hong Kong property development conglomerate Sino Group and Singaporean Real Estate Billionaire
- Ng Chee Yang 黄智阳 (born 1989), Singaporean singer
- Huang Cheng Hui 黄呈辉, also known as John K.C. Ng (1939–2013), Filipino Chinese businessman, philanthropist, former Presidential Advisor and Special Envoy for China Affairs
- Huang Ching He 黄瀞亿 (born 1978), British Chinese food writer and chef
- Wee Chong Jin 黄宗仁 (1917–2005), Judge and the First Chief Justice of Singapore
- Ng Choon Siong 黄俊雄 or Elvin Ng (born 1980), Singaporean actor and model
- Wee Cho Yaw 黄祖耀 (1929–2024), Singaporean businessman, and the current Chairman of the United Overseas Bank (UOB) and United Industrial Corporation (UIC) in Singapore
- Huang Chuang Shan 黄创山, also known as Keeree Kanjanapas (born 1950), Thailand-based entrepreneur with extensive business interests in mass transit and real estate in the Kingdom of Thailand
- Wong Doc Fai 黄德輝 (born 1948), internationally recognized master of Choy Li Fut kung fu and tai chi
- Oei Ektjong 黄亦聪 or Eka Tjipta Widjaja (born 1923), Indonesian billionaire
- Ng Eng Hen 黄永宏 (born 1958), former doctor and Minister of Defence of Singapore
- Ng Eng Teng 黄荣庭 (1934–2001), Singaporean sculptor
- Freddie Wong 黄谷子 (born 1985), American internet celebrity and filmmaker
- Huang Gantapawei 黄甘塔帕薇 or Ing Kuntha Phavi អឹង កន្ថាផាវី (born 1960), Current Minister of Women's Affairs of Cambodia
- Wong Gen Yeo 黄齐耀 or Tyrus Wong (born 1910), Chinese American painter, muralist, ceramicist, lithographer, and designer
- Hao Huang, American mathematician
- Wong Hok Sing 黄鹤声 (1915–1993), Chinese American actor and director
- Alien Huang 黃鴻升 (1983–2000), Taiwanese actor and singer
- Hosea Wong 黄振宇 (born 2003), Bruneian wushu athlete
- Oei Hui Lan 黃蕙蘭 (1889–1992), Chinese-Indonesian socialite and First Lady of the Republic of China (1926–1927)
- Oey Hui Siang 黄惠祥 or Michael Bambang Hartono (born 1941), Indonesian tobacco billionaire
- Oey Hui Tiong 黄惠忠 or Robert Budi Hartono (born 1940), Indonesian tobacco billionaire
- Ung Huot 黄发 (born 1945), Former Prime Minister of Cambodia
- Wong Jeh Shyan 黄哲贤 (born 1964), Former CEO of CommerceNet Singapore, and co-founder and CEO of Ecommerce Gateway Pte. Ltd.
- Huang Jen Hsun 黃仁勳 or Jensen Huang (born 1963), co-founder and former President and CEO of Nvidia Corporation
- Huang Jia Lue 黄嘉略 or Arcadio Huang (1679–1716), French Chinese Pioneer who compiled first Chinese-French Lexicon and first Chinese Grammar in French
- Huang Jin Shao 黄锦绍 or Delbert Earl Wong (1920–2006), First Chinese American judge in the continental United States
- Ng Jui Ping 黄维彬 (1948–2020), Singaporean Lieutenant General and former Chief of Defence Force (CDF) of the Singapore Armed Forces (SAF)
- Huang Jun Rong 黄俊融 or Jarrell Huang (born 2000), Singaporean actor and singer
- Ong Ka Chuan 黄家泉 (born 1954), Secretary-General of the Malaysian Chinese Association (MCA), Former Minister of Housing and Local Government and Current Second Minister for International Trade and Industry of Malaysia
- Wong Kan Seng 黄根成 (born 1946), Singaporean director and former Singaporean politician
- Ong Ka Ting 黄家定 (born 1956), President of Malaysian Chinese Association (MCA), Minister of Housing and Local Government and Acting Minister of Health of Malaysia
- Ng Kah Ting 黄嘉腾 (born 1940), former Singaporean politician and civil servant
- Wee Kheng Chiang 黄庆昌 (1890–1978), Malaysian Chinese businessman and founder of United Overseas Bank (UOB) in Singapore
- Ng Ki-pin 黃奇斌 (born 1990), Taiwanese singer and EggPlantEgg (茄子蛋) band member
- Oey Kian Kok 黄建国 or Christianto Wibisono (1945–2021), prominent Chinese Indonesian business analyst in Indonesia
- Wong Kim Min 黄金明 or James Wong (1922–2011), Malaysian Chinese Leader of the Opposition in Malaysia and Deputy Chief Minister of Sarawak
- Wee Kim Wee 黄金辉 (1915–2005), former president of the Republic of Singapore
- Ng Kok Kwang 黄国光 or Louis Ng (born 1978), Singaporean politician and founder of Animal Concerns Research and Education Society (ACRES)
- Ng Kok Song 黄国松 (born 1948), Singaporean businessman
- Huang Lan Hsuan 黃籃萱, Taiwanese-American mathematician
- Wong Liu Tsong 黄柳霜 or Anna May Wong (1905–1961), First Chinese American movie star and first Asian-American actress to gain international recognition
- Melki Sedek Huang (born 2000), Indonesian activist and sex offender who formerly served as Chairman of the Student Executive Board at University of Indonesia
- Morgan Oey, Indonesian actor and singer
- Namewee or Wee Meng Chee 黃明志 (born 1983), Malaysian singer and actor
- Wong Mun Charn 黄门赞 (1918–2002), Chinese American businessman and first Chinese-American fighter pilot
- Huang Pei Qian 黄培谦 or Puey Ungpakorn ป๋วย อึ๊งภากรณ์ (1916–1999), Thai bureaucrat who played a central role in the shaping of Thailand's economic development and in the strengthening of its system of higher education
- Wong Peng Soon 黄秉璇 (1918–1996), Chinese Malaysian badminton player who reigned as a top player in Malaya from the 1930s to the 1950s
- Huang Ren Yu 黄仁宇 or Ray Huang (1918–2000), Chinese historian and philosopher, best known in his later years for the idea of macro history
- Huang Ru You 黄如佑 Loke Yew (1845–1917), businessman and philanthropist in British Malaya. He was regarded as the richest man in British Malaya during his time.
- Huang Ruo 黄若 (born 1976), Chinese American Composer, pianist and vocalist
- Huang Shao Fan 黄少凡 or Hasan Karman (born 1962), Former Mayor of Singkawang, West Kalimantan and First Chinese Mayor of Indonesia
- Huang Shiaan Bin 黄士豪, Member of Parliament of South Africa, Member of the African National Congress (ANC), Former Deputy Mayor of Newcastle in KwaZulu-Natal and Former Executive Councillor of Newcastle
- Huang Shi Hou 黄诗厚 or Alice S. Huang (born 1939), Chinese American biologist specialized Microbiology and Virology
- Huang Shi Tao 黄煦涛 or Thomas Huang (born 1936), Chinese Academician of Science in computer vision, pattern recognition and human-computer interaction
- Wong Shyun Tsai 黄循财 or Lawrence Wong (born 1972), Prime Minister and Minister for Finance of Singapore
- Wong Si Tian 黄思恬 or Carrie Wong (born 1994), Singaporean actress
- Huang Su Shu 黄授书 (1915–1977), Chinese American astrophysicist and asteroid 3014 Huangsushu was named after him
- Ng Teng Fong 黄廷芳 (1928–2010), Singaporean real estate tycoon
- Huang Tian Xi 黄天喜 or Thian Hee (1848–1925), Prominent military doctor, influential merchant and founder of the illustrious Sarasin Family in the Kingdom of Thailand
- Oei Tiong Ham 黄仲涵 (1866–1924), Indonesian businessman
- Oei Tjeng Hien 黃清興 or Abdul Karim Oei (1905–1988), Indonesian politician and founder of Indonesian Chinese Muslim Association (PITI)
- Oei Tjoe Tat 黄自达 (1922–1996), First Chinese Indonesian Minister of State of Indonesia
- Huang Tseng Hao 黄俊豪 or Hao Huang (born 1957), Chinese American concert pianist and music professor
- Wong Tung Jim 黄宗沾 or James Wong Howe (1899–1976), Chinese American cinematographer
- Oei Wie Gwan 黄维源 (?–1963), Indonesian businessman and entrepreneur
- Huang Wen Bo 黄闻波 or Boonchu Rojanastien (1921–2007), Former Deputy Prime Minister and Minister of Finance of Thailand
- Huang Wen Shiung 黄文雄 or Peter Huang (born 1937), Japanese Chinese writer and activist active in Taiwan for democratization and human rights
- Huang Wen Yong 黄文永 (1952–2013), Singaporean actor
- Huang Xi 黄西 or Joe Wong (born 1970), Chinese American stand-up comedian and chemical engineer
- Huang Xin Xiang 黄馨祥 or Patrick Soon-Shiong (born 1952), South African-born American surgeon, medical researcher, businessman, philanthropist, and professor at University of California, Los Angeles
- Huang Xue Dong 黄学东 (born 1962), Microsoft's Chief speech scientist. He was named one of the "25 Geniuses of Next List 2016" in Wire magazine.
- Huang Yan Hui 黄彦辉 Arthur C. Yap (born 1965), Former Filipino Chinese Secretary of Agriculture and Member of the House of Representatives of the Philippines
- Wong Yee Ching 黄以静 or Flossie Wong-Staal (1947–2020), Chinese American virologist and molecular biologist. She was the first scientist to clone HIV and determine the function of its genes, a major step in proving that HIV is the cause of AIDS.
- Ng Yen Yen 黄燕燕 (born 1946), Malaysian Chinese politician, former Minister of Tourism in the Malaysian Cabinet and Current Vice-president of Malaysian Chinese Association (MCA)
- Huang Yi Liang 黄奕良 (born 1961), Singaporean actor
- Huang Yi Ming 黄颐铭 or Eddie Huang (born 1981), Chinese American restaurateur, chef, food personality, writer, and Attorney
- Wong Ying Yen 黄英贤 or Penny Wong (born 1968), Senator and Minister for Foreign Affairs, Former Minister for Finance and Deregulation, and Minister for Climate Change, Energy Efficiency and Water of Australia
- Wong Yi Shan 黄易山, CEO of Reddit, co-founder at Mountain View coworking space Sunfire Offices, and Advisor at Quora, an online knowledge market
- Huang Yi Yu 黄毅瑜 or James Wong (born 1959), Chinese American Television Producer, Writer and Film Director
- Huang Yuan Ling 黄苑玲 or Ruthlane Uy Asmundson (born 1945), Former Mayor of the City of Davis, California and First Female Filipino Migrant to be elected into the position of mayor in an American city
- Huang Yu De Hu 黄欲德虎 or Cham Prasidh ចម ប្រសិទ្ធ (born 1951), Current Minister of Industry and Handicrafts and Former Minister of Commerce of Cambodia
- Huang Yu Tang 黄玉堂 or Nelson Wang (born 1950), Indian Chinese restaurateur
- Huang Zhe Lun 黄哲伦 or David Henry Hwang (born 1957), Chinese American playwright, librettist, screenwriter, and theater professor
- Huang Zhen Tan 黄祯谭 or Alfonso A. Uy, Filipino Chinese businessman, and former and first President of the Federation of Filipino Chinese Chambers of Commerce & Industry
- Nigel Ng 黄瑾瑜 (born 1991), Malaysian Chinese standup comedian and internet personality of Hokkien descent, known for portraying the character Uncle Roger.
- Christiandy Sanjaya 黃漢山 (born 1964), Senator in Regional Representative Council and Vice Governor of West Kalimantan

== Hoàng/Huỳnh ==
The Vietnamese versions of this surname are Hoàng and Huỳnh. According to Lê Trung Hoa, a Vietnamese scholar, approximately 5.1 percent of Vietnamese people have this surname. The original form of this surname was Hoàng. But in southern Vietnam, Hoàng was ordered to be changed (excluding the Hoàng Trọng family) to Huỳnh due to a naming taboo with the name of Lord Nguyễn Hoàng.

=== Notable people with Hoàng surname ===
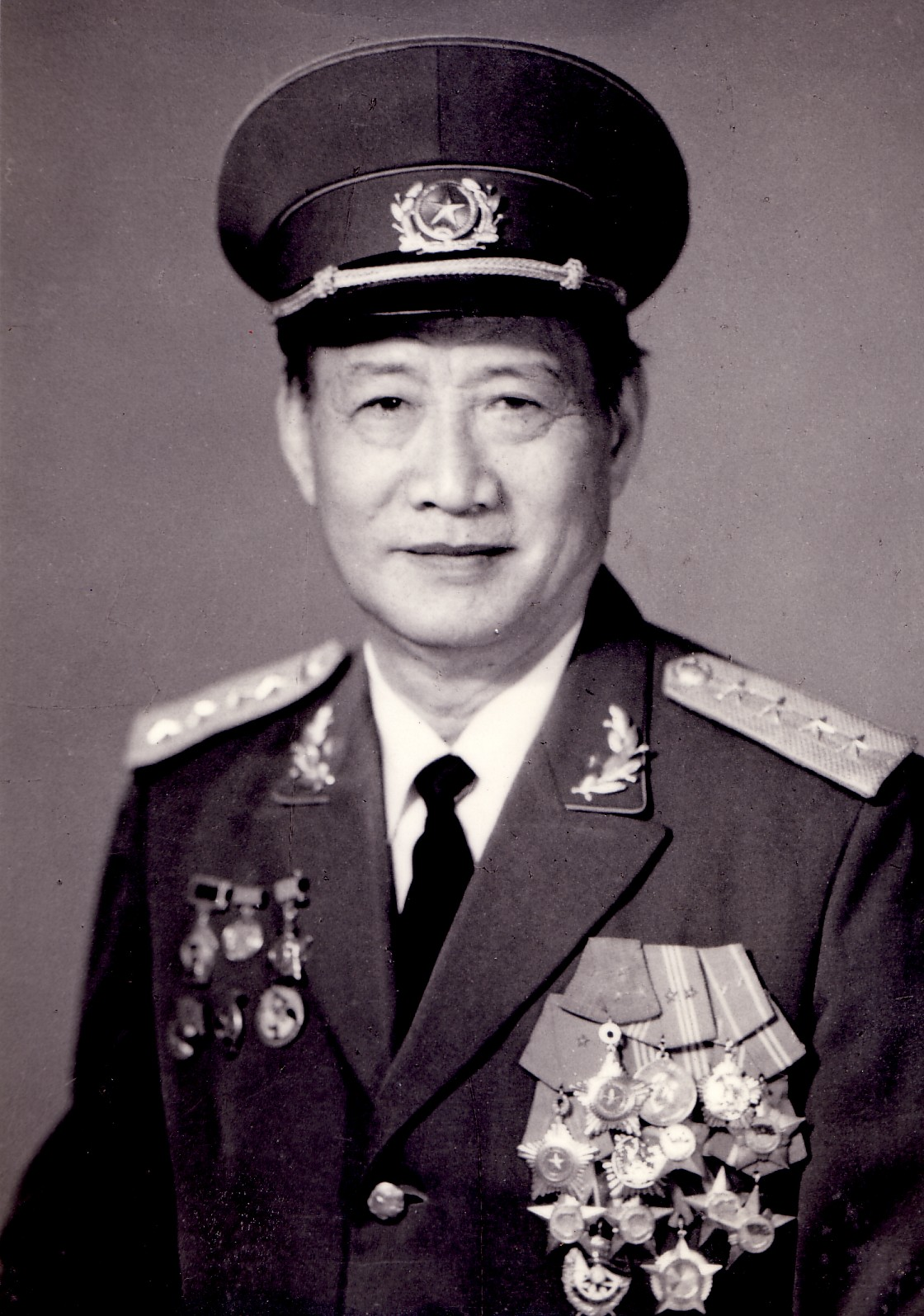
Vietnamese General, Hoàng Văn Thái

- Hoàng Anh Tuấn (born 1985), Vietnamese weightlifter
- Hoàng Cầm (poet) (1922–2010), Vietnamese poet, playwright, and novelist
- Hoàng Cầm (general) (1920–2013), Major General of People's Army of Vietnam
- Hoàng Cầm (1916–1996), Inventor of the Việt Minh Hoàng Cầm stove
- Hoàng Cao Khải ( 黃高啟; 1850–1933), Viceroy of Tonkin (locally known as Bắc Kỳ), the northernmost of the three parts of Vietnam under French colonial rule, Minister of War 兵部尚書, Duke of Duyên Mậu Quận (Duyên Mậu Quận Công 延茂郡公) and Prince's Tutor 太子太傅 of Nguyễn dynasty
- Hoàng Châu Ký (1921–2008), Vietnamese professor of literature and playwright
- Hoàng Cơ Minh (1935–1987), First Chairman of the Việt Tân (Vietnam Reform Party) and Democracy Activist
- Hoàng Đăng Huệ (1932–2015), Major General of Ministry of Defence and Political Commissar of the High Command of Tank and Armour of Vietnam
- Hoàng Diệu ( 黃耀; 1828–1882), Nguyễn dynasty Governor of Hanoi on behalf of Emperor Tự Đức resident in Huế
- Hoàng Hiệp (1931–2013), Vietnamese songwriter and recipient of the Hồ Chí Minh Prize in 2000
- Hoàng Hồng Cẩm (1959–2011), Vietnamese painter
- Hoàng Kế Viêm ( 黃繼炎; 1820–1909), Nguyễn dynasty General, Dong'ge Grand Secretariat 東閣大學士, Viscount of Địch Trung (Địch Trung Tử 迪忠子) and Count of Địch Trung (Địch Trung Bá 迪忠伯)
- Hoang Kieu, Vietnamese-American billionaire
- Hoàng Lập Ngôn (1910–2006), Vietnamese painter
- Hoàng Minh Chính (1922–2008), Vietnamese politician, dissident, and one of the best-known figures and ideologists of the Vietnamese Communist Party during the 1960s
- Hoàng Sĩ Trinh (poet) (1920–2011), known professionally as Hà Thượng Nhân
- Hoàng Thị Loan (1868–1901), Mother of Hồ Chí Minh
- Hoàng Thi Thơ (1929–2001), Vietnamese songwriter
- Hoàng Tích Chu (1897–1933), Vietnamese journalist
- Hoàng Tích Chù (1912–2003), Vietnamese painter
- Hoàng Trọng (1922–1998), Vietnamese songwriter
- Hoàng Trung Hải (born 1959), Deputy Prime Minister of Vietnam
- Hoàng Tụy (1927–2019), Prominent Vietnamese applied mathematician
- Hoàng Văn Chí (1913–1988), One of the first Vietnamese political writers, and prominent intellectual who was an opponent of colonialism and later of communism in Vietnam
- Hoàng Văn Hoan (1905–1991), Founding Member of the Indochinese Communist Party, and a Politburo Member of the Lao Dong Party (Vietnam Workers' Party-VWP) from 1960 to 1976
- Hoàng Văn Thái (1915–1986), Vietnamese General and Chief of General Staff of Vietnam People's Army
- Hoàng Xuân Hãn ( 黃春罕; 1908–1996), Vietnamese Professor of mathematics, linguist, historian and educationalist
- Hoàng Xuân Sính, Vietnamese Mathematician, Founder of Thăng Long University and Recipient of the Ordre des Palmes Académiques
- Hoàng Xuân Vinh (born 1974), Vietnamese Shooter and First Ever Olympic Gold Medallist of Vietnam
- Hoàng Thị Thùy (born 1992), Vietnamese model and beauty queen who was appointed as Miss Universe Vietnam 2019

=== Notable people with Huỳnh surname ===
- Alex Huynh, Vietnamese-American martial artist and stuntman
- Alexandra Huynh, Australian association football player
- Carol Huynh (born 1980), Vietnamese-Canadian freestyle wrestler
- Huỳnh Công Út (born 1951), Photographer for the Associated Press (AP) who works out of Los Angeles. He won the 1973 Pulitzer Prize for Spot News Photography for "The Terror of War", depicting children in flight from a napalm bombing.
- Huỳnh Phú Sổ (1920–1947), Founder of the Hòa Hảo religious tradition
- Huỳnh Sanh Thông (1926–2008), Vietnamese-American scholar and translator
- Huỳnh Tấn Phát (1913–1989), Former Vice President and Prime Minister of Vietnam
- Huỳnh Thúc Kháng ( 黃叔抗; 1876–1947), Vietnamese anti-colonialist
- Huỳnh Tường Đức ( 黃奉德), who later became Nguyễn Huỳnh Đức ( 阮黃德; 1748–1819), Nguyễn dynasty Founding Grand General (輔國上將軍, 上柱國), Grand Tutor 太傅, Duke of Kiến Xương (Kiến Xương Quận Công 建昌郡公) and one of the "Five Tiger-Generals of Gia Định" (Gia Định ngũ hổ tướng 嘉定五虎將)
- Huỳnh Văn Cao (1927–2013), Major General in the Army of the Republic of Vietnam
- Huỳnh Văn Gấm (1922–1987), Vietnamese painter
- Xanthe Huynh, American voice actor

== Fictional characters ==
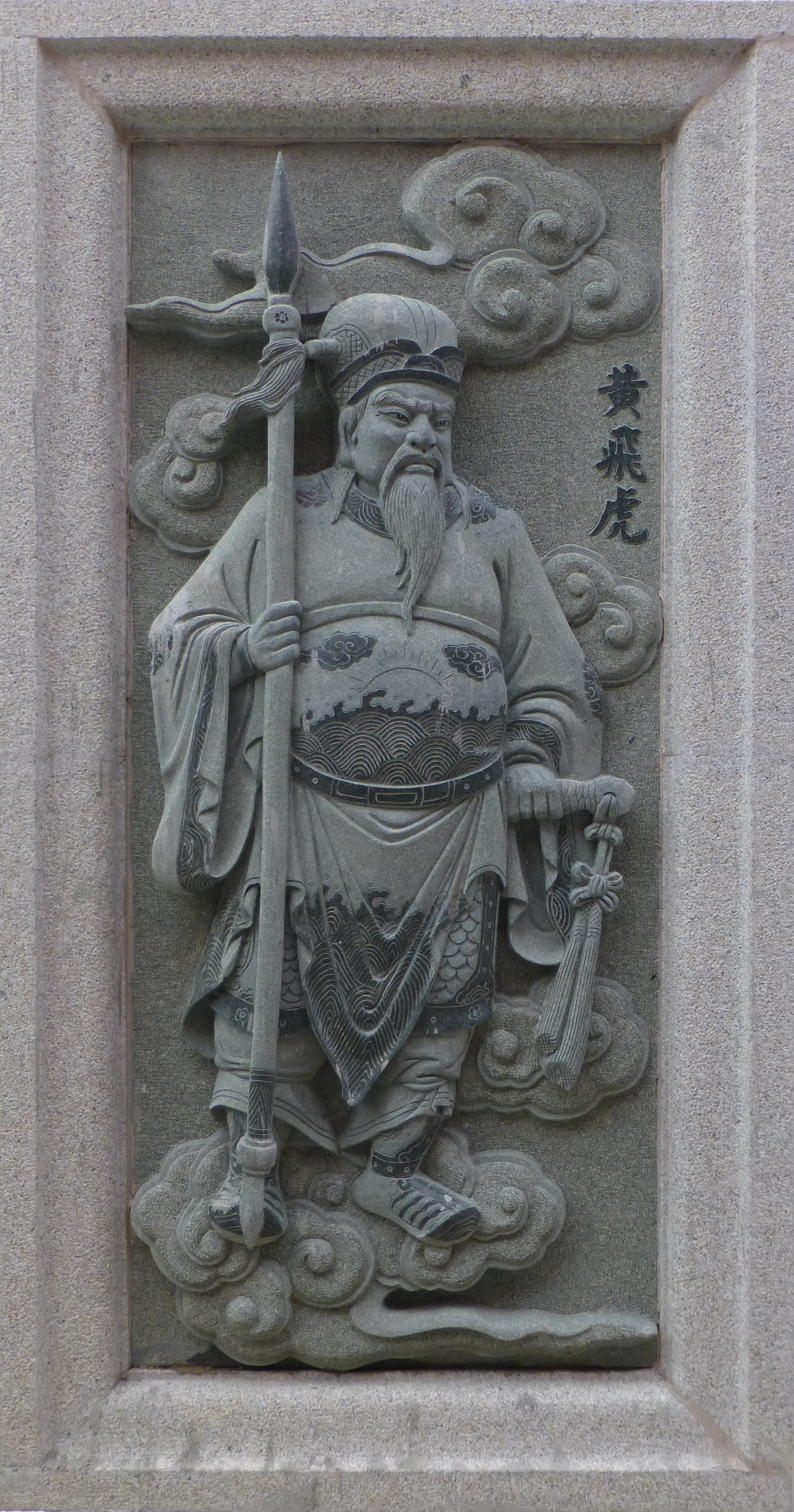
Prince of Wucheng, Huang Feihu (黃飛虎)

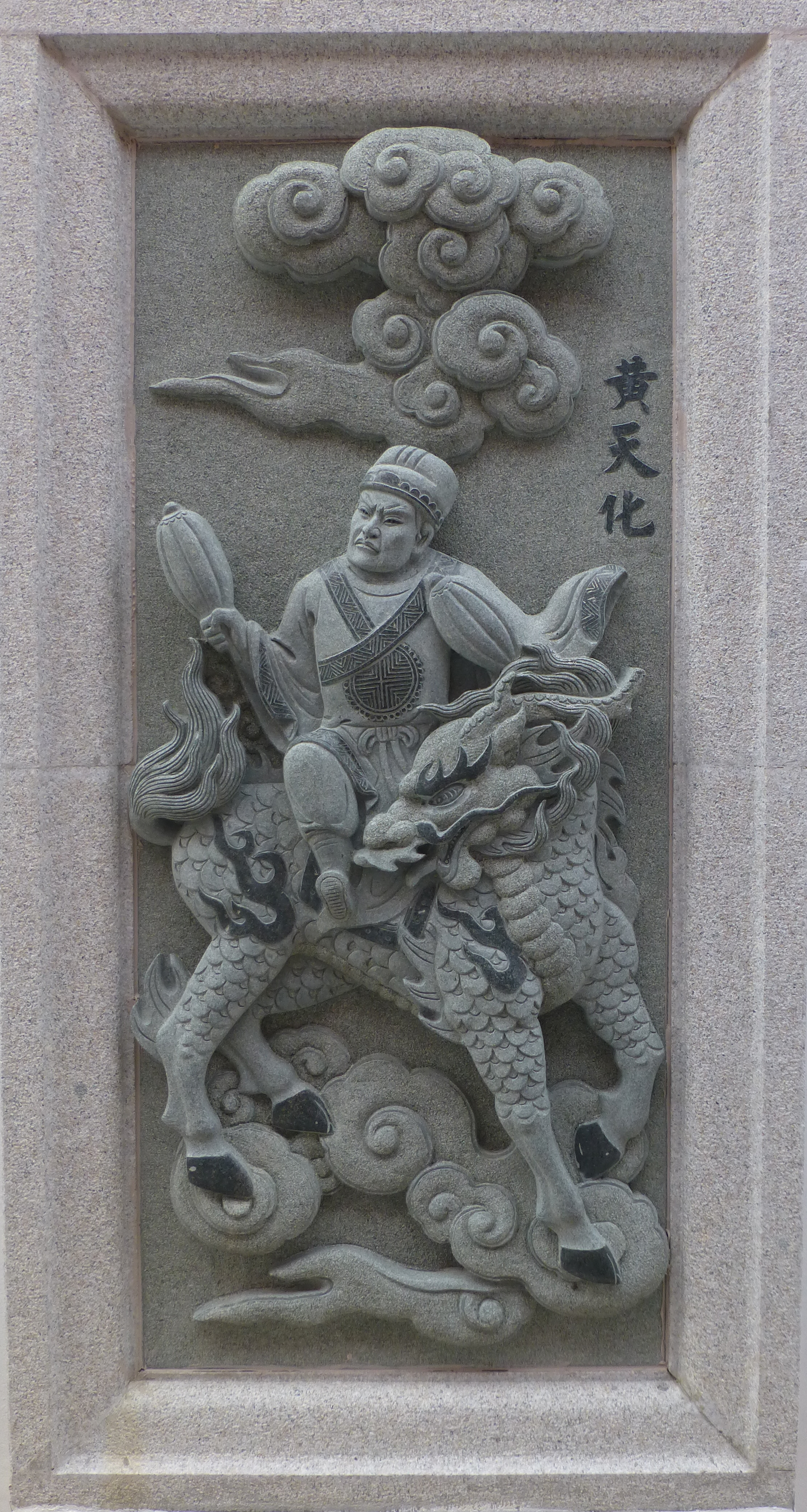
God of War, Huang Tianhua (黃天化)

- Huang Bu-Ling (黄 歩鈴), member of the Mew Mew team in the 2002 Japanese manga series Tokyo Mew Mew
- Huang Feihu (黃飛虎), General of Shang dynasty and later of Zhou dynasty, Prince of Wucheng (國武成王) and Great Emperor of the Mount Tai (東嶽泰山天齊仁聖大帝) who oversees the fortunes and fates of mortals and the Eighteen Levels of Hell in Chinese classic novel Investiture of the Gods
- Huang Gun (黃滾), General of Shang dynasty and later of Zhou dynasty in Chinese classic novel Investiture of the Gods
- Huang Rong (黃蓉), Daughter of Huang Yaoshi and Beggars' Gang's chief in Jin Yong's wuxia novel The Legend of the Condor Heroes and its sequel The Return of the Condor Heroes
- Huang Xin (黃信), nicknamed "Guardian of the Three Mountains", Scouting general of the Liangshan cavalry, 38th of the 108 Liangshan heroes and Deity of Di'sha Star (地煞星) in Water Margin, one of the Four Great Classical Novels of Chinese literature
- Huang Yaoshi (黃藥師), nicknamed "Eastern Heretic" (東邪), Master of Peach Blossom Island and one of the Five Greats of the wulin (martial artists' community) during the Song dynasty in Jin Yong's wuxia novel The Legend of the Condor Heroes and its sequel The Return of the Condor Heroes
- Huang Yuanji (黃元濟), General of Shang dynasty and Deity of Can'chu Star (蠶畜星) in Chinese classic novel Investiture of the Gods

== See also ==
- Hwang (surname)
- Ng (surname)
- Wong (surname)
- Wang (surname)
