= Uy (surname) =

Uy is one of several Hokkien transcriptions of the Chinese surname 黃, which is Huang in Mandarin. It is one of the historical Hokkien romanization from Spanish orthography and is one of several Hokkien Chinese surnames used in particular by Chinese Filipinos. Notable people with the surname include:

- Alberto Uy (born 1966), Filipino prelate, current Archbishop of Cebu
- Alfonso A. Uy, Chinese-Filipino businessman
- John James Uy (born 1987), Chinese-Filipino actor, artist, host and model
- Matthew Uy (born 1990), American-born Filipino footballer
- Juliette Uy, Filipino politician
- Rolando Uy (born 1954), Filipino politician
- Ruthlane Uy Asmundson (born 1945), Filipino-born American politician
- Steve Uy (born 1979), American comic book artist and writer
