= Dahuangbao =

Town in Wuqing District, Tianjin, China

Dahuangbao Town 大黄堡镇 Dahuangpu
- Town
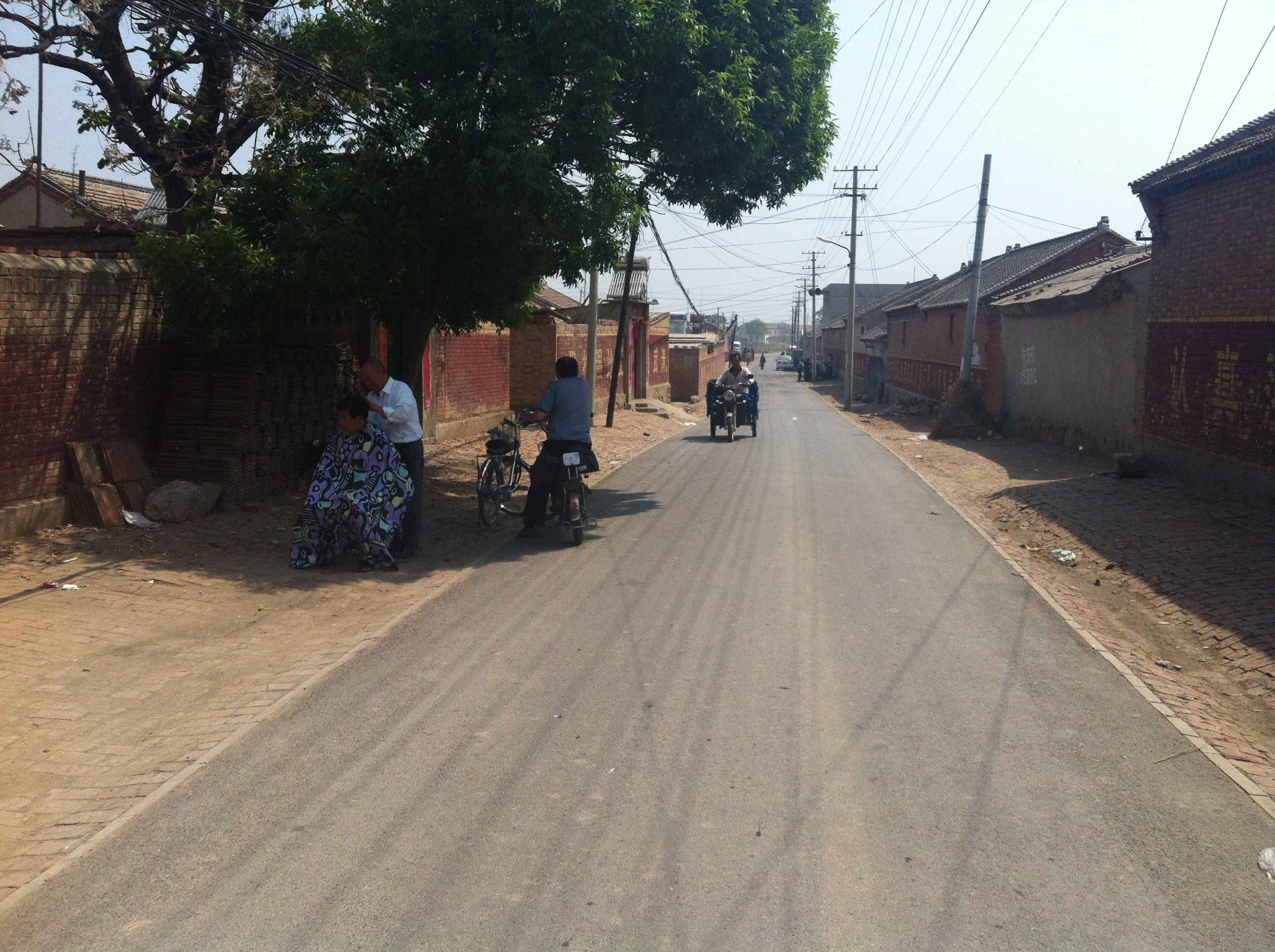
- Chenzhuang Village in Dahuangbao

- Location within Tianjin Location within China
- Coordinates: 39°26′16″N 117°16′11″E
- Country: China
- Municipality: Tianjin
- District: Wuqing
- Village-level Divisions: 1 community 28 villages

Area
  - Total: 91.39 km^{2} (35.29 sq mi)
- Elevation: 4 m (13 ft)

Population (2010)
  - Total: 18,432
  - Density: 201.7/km^{2} (522.4/sq mi)
- Time zone: UTC+8 (CST)
- Postal code: 301731
- Area code: 022

Dahuangbao Town (simplified Chinese: 大黄堡镇; traditional Chinese: 大黃堡鎮; pinyin: Dàhuángbǎo Zhèn), also known as Dahuangpu Town, is a town located in the eastern part of Wuqing District, Tianjin, China. It shares border with Cuihuangkou Town to the north, Niujiapai and Erwangzhuang Towns to the east, Shangmatai Town to the south, and Caozili Town to the west. In the year 2010, its population was 18,432.

In the Ming dynasty, this region was settled by families with the surname Huang. The settlement later split into two, with the larger one becoming the town Dahuangbao (Chinese: 大黄堡; lit. 'Large Huang's Fort').

== Geography ==
Dahuangbao Town is located on the eastern shore of Longfeng River. The average elevation in the town is 4 meters.

== History ==
Chronology of Dahuangbao Town
Year	Status	Part of
1952 – 1957	Within 5th District	Wuqing County, Hebei
1957 – 1966	Dahuangbao Township	Wuqing County, Hebei
1966 – 1973	Dahuangbao People's Commune	Wuqing County, Hebei
1973 – 1983	Dahuangbao People's Commune	Wuqing County, Tianjin
1983 – 2000	Dahuangbao Township	Wuqing County, Tianjin
2000 – 2013	Dahuangbao Township	Wuqing District, Tianjin
2013 – present	Dahuangbao Town	Wuqing District, Tianjin

== Administrative divisions ==
As of the year 2022, Dahuangbao Town consisted of 29 subdivisions, which are listed as follows:

=== Residential community ===
- Chaoyangli (朝阳里)

=== Villages ===
- Dahuangbao (大黄堡)
- Xiaohuangbao (小黄堡)
- Chenzhuang (陈庄)
- Zhaozhuang (赵庄)
- Zhongxintai (忠辛台)
- Zhucaozi (朱曹子)
- Wuzhuanghu (武庄户)
- Zhangxin'anzhuang (张辛安庄)
- Qianpubang (前蒲棒)
- Houpubang (后蒲棒)
- Caojiagang (曹家岗)
- Dongbalizhuang (东八里庄)
- Simaying (四马营)
- Sigaozhuang (四高庄)
- Liujinzhuang (刘靳庄)
- Puxiantuo (普贤坨)
- Jiangzhuangzi (蒋庄子)
- Bailou (白楼)
- Wuzidian (务滋甸)
- Dayangzhuang (大杨庄)
- Xiaoyangzhuang (小杨庄)
- Xiaoshizhuang (小石庄)
- Daizhuangzi (代庄子)
- Guowangzhuang (果汪庄)
- Qianhuzhuang (千户庄)
- Dongsiwo (东丝窝)
- Xisiwo (西丝窝)
- Dongwangzhuang (东汪庄)

== See also ==
- List of township-level divisions of Tianjin
