= Putian people =

Ethnic group native to China

Putianese 莆仙人/興(兴)化人 Pó-sing-náng/Hing-hua̍-náng
Regions with significant populations
- China (Putian), Southeast Asia

Languages
- Puxian Min, Standard Chinese

Religion
- Traditional Chinese religion

Related ethnic groups
- Other Min speakers, especially Hoklos, Fuzhounese and Hainanese

The Putian people (Chinese: 莆田人; pinyin: Pútiánrén, Puxian Min: 莆仙儂, Hinghwa Romanized: Pó-sing-náng) are a Min-speaking Han Chinese sub-ethnic group native to Putian, Fujian, China. They are also known as Xinghua, Henghua, Henghwa or Hinghua people (Hing-hua̍; simplified Chinese: 兴化; traditional Chinese: 興化; pinyin: Xīnghuà) after the historical name of the area. Putian people speak Pu–Xian Min, referred locally as Putianese or Hinghua, a branch of Min Chinese.

Today, there are Henghua diaspora communities at Thailand, Hong Kong, Vietnam, Malaysia, Singapore, Australia and Indonesia.

== Culture ==
Putian cuisine is a style of Fujian cuisine known for its emphasis on fresh seafood.

== Notable people ==
- Lin Moniang: also known as Mazu (媽祖), Chinese Goddess of Sea
- Cai Xiang (蔡襄; 1012–1067): Chinese calligrapher, poet, scholar and official
- Chen Wenlong (陳文龍; 1232–1277): Scholarly General during the final years of the Southern Song Dynasty, was later deified as City God of Fuzhou and Putian during the Ming Dynasty
- Jianqing Fan (范剑青; 1962-): Statistician, financial econometrician, Professor of Finance, a professor of statistics, a Chairman of Department of Operations Research and Finance
- Ng Teng Fong: Singaporean real estate tycoon
- Dato Sri Tahir or Ang Tjoen Ming: Founder and CEO, Mayapada Group, Indonesia
- Mochtar Riady: Founder, Lippo Group, Indonesia
- Sukanto Tanoto: Founder, Raja Garuda Mas International (now Royal Golden Eagle), Indonesia
- James Riady: Son of Mochtar Riady; deputy chairman, Lippo Group, Indonesia
- Moses Lim, Singapore comedian and actor
- Liem Swie King (林水鏡; Lín Shuǐjìng, born 28 February 1956 in Kudus) a former Indonesian badminton player, once one of the top players in the world
- Ng Eng Hen, Minister of Defence (Singapore).
- Che Yin Wong (黄志贤, 1959−): Businessman and philanthropist, Hong Kong; Founder and chairman of Kong Fung International Group.
- Theresa Fu (1984-): Hong Kong singer and actress.
- Fong Chi Chung: founder of Singapore-based restaurant chain Putien.
- John Sung: evangelist

== See also ==
- Fuzhou people
- Hoklo people
- Pu-Xian Min
