= Huang Wei (disambiguation) =

Huang Wei (1904–1989) was a general of the Republic of China.

Huang Wei may also refer to:

- Huang Wei (businessman) (born 1959), Chinese real estate developer
- Huang Wei (footballer) (born 1993), Chinese football player
- Huang Wei (actress), Chinese actress and TV host
- Viya (influencer) (born 1985), or Huang Wei, Chinese social media personality
- Wong Wai, or Huang Wei in pinyin (born 1992), Hong Kong football player
