= Central Philippine University – College of Engineering =

Engineering school at Central Philippine University

Central Philippine University College of Engineering
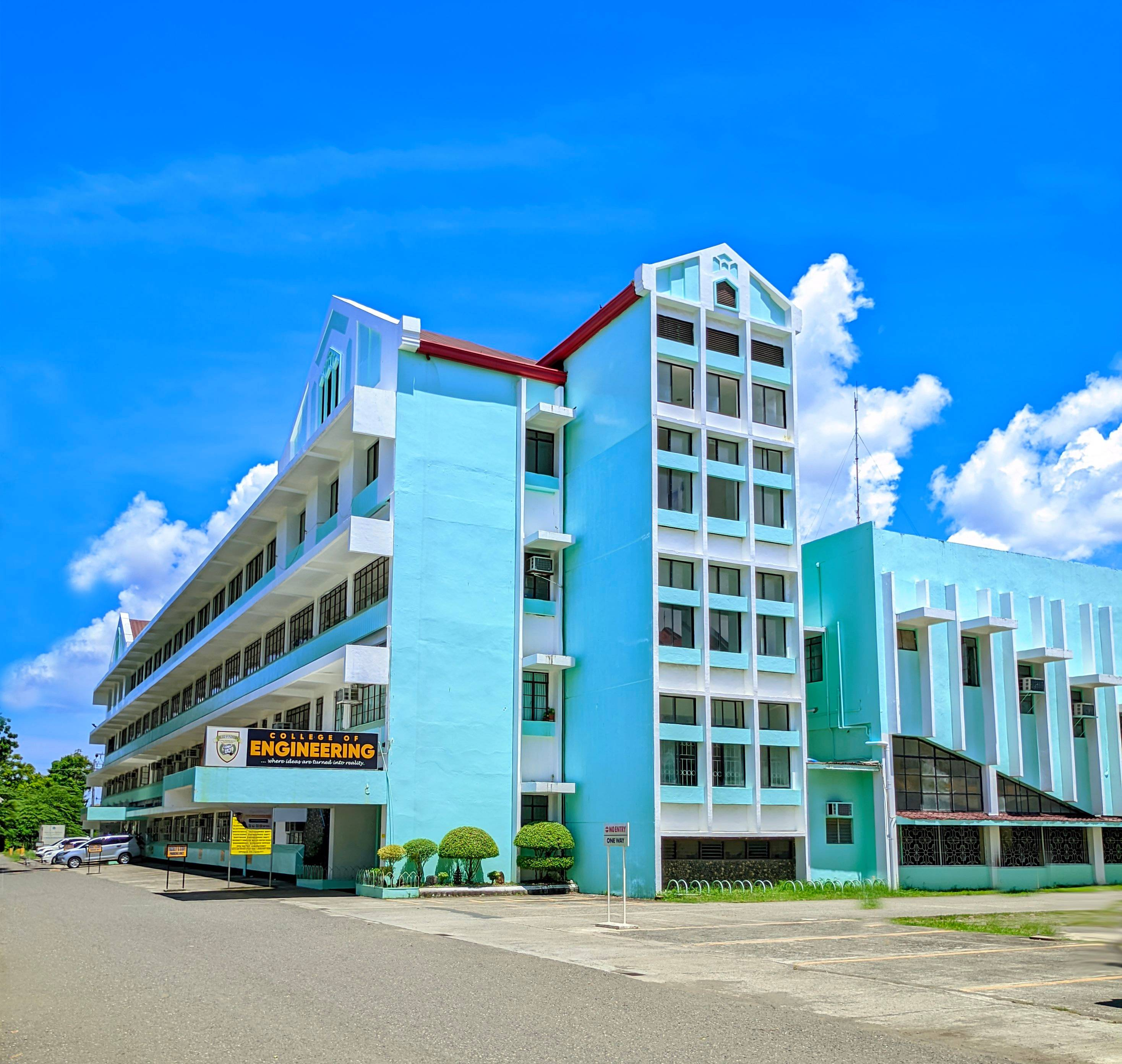
- The Engineering Building of the CPU College of Engineering
- Motto: Scientia et Fides (Latin)
- Motto in English: Knowledge and Faith
- Type: Private research engineering school
- Established: 1936
- President: Rev. Dr. Ernest Howard B. Dagohoy D.Min., M.Div.
- Dean: Dany Molina, M.S.M.E., Ph.D.
- Location: Jaro, Iloilo City, Iloilo, Philippines; 10°43′49″N 122°32′56″E
- Campus: 59.30 acres (24.00 ha)
- Colors: Red & black
- Nickname: CPU Engineering Titans (CPU COE Titans)
- Website: cpu.edu.ph/college-of-engineering
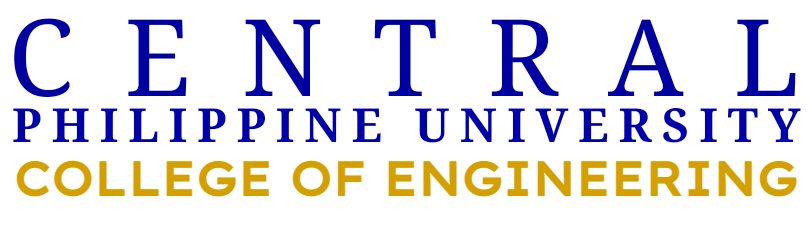

The Central Philippine University College of Engineering, also referred to as CPU COE, CPU College of Engineering or CPU Engineering, is one of the academic units of Central Philippine University, a private university in Iloilo City, Philippines. Founded in 1936 during the American presidency of Central, Harland F. Stuart, it is one of the oldest engineering schools in the Philippines founded by the Americans. It later changed its status to a full college when Central Philippine College became a university in 1953.

The college has been recognized as National Centers of Development in Chemical Engineering, Electrical Engineering and Electronics Engineering by the Commission on Higher Education (the only engineering school in the Western Visayas region and one of the few in the country with such designation). The college is also the only Department of Science and Technology (Philippines) (DOST) Engineering school, Heat Transfer Facility and Center for Civil Engineering Education for Western Visayas region.

The college has various research and auxiliary centers under its umbrella which include the CPU Affiliated Renewable Energy Center (serves the whole Western Visayas area which is funded jointly by the Department of Energy (Philippines)) and the CPU Philippine Center for Packaging Engineering and Technology, the first of its kind in the South East Asia (backed by the college's department of Packaging Engineering and the Department of Science and Technology (Philippines).) The college collaborates since 2012 in the fields of Transportation and Structural engineering research with De la Salle University.

The college confers seven undergraduate degrees with two degrees, the Bachelor of Science in Packaging Engineering and Bachelor of Science in Software, both firsts in the Philippines.

The incumbent dean of the college, Engineering Dany Molina, serves as the National President of the Philippine Association of Engineering Schools (PAES), the first to held such position from outside of Manila since 1955.

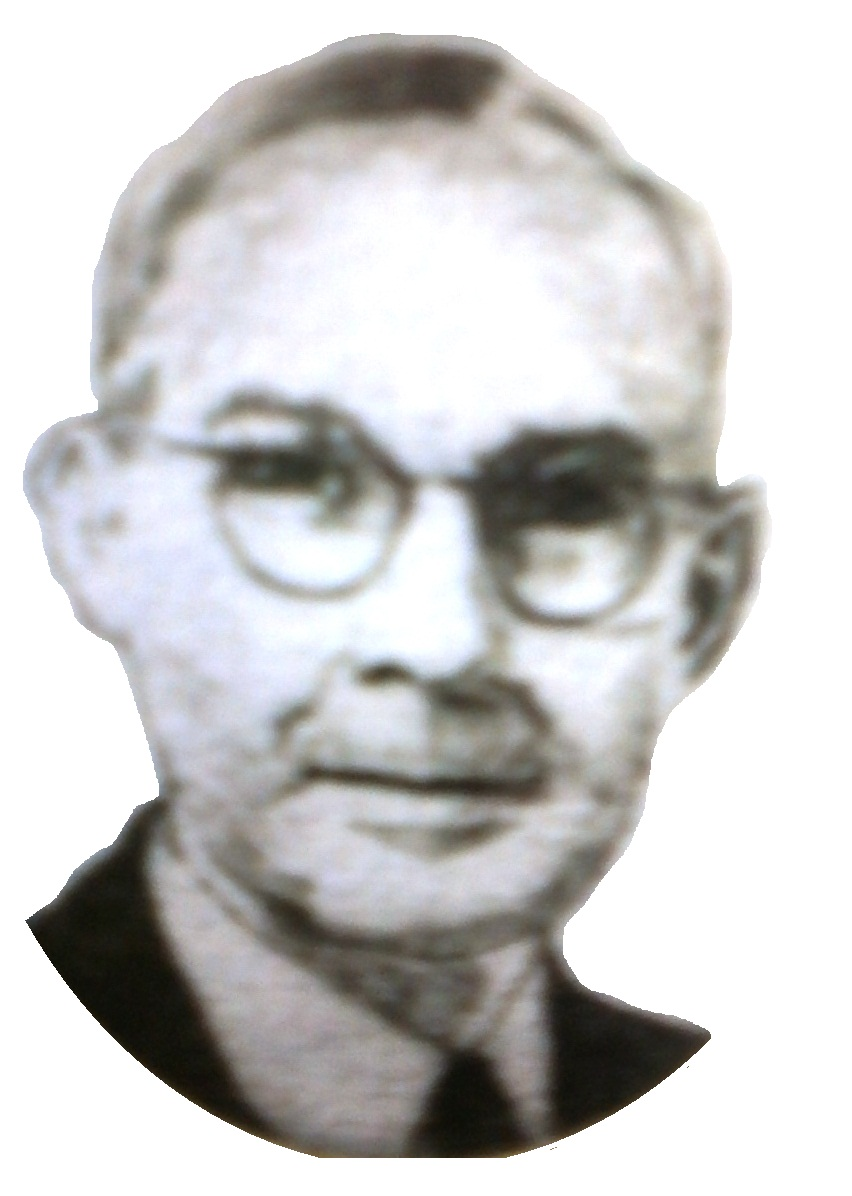
Harland Francis Chandler Stuart, the 7th President of Central, established the College of Engineering in 1936. (Sketched portrait of Harland Stuart)

== Academic programs ==
The college is the only Department of Science and Technology (DOST) – Philippines School for Western Visayas and is accredited by Philippine Accrediting Association of Schools, Colleges and Universities (PAASCU). It offers seven (Five-year and Six-year curriculum) undergraduate programs through the college alone and graduate programs through the Central Philippine University School of Graduate Studies.

== Facilities ==
The CPU College of Engineering is housed in the 3,791.6 square meter 4-storey Engineering Building which houses college's classroom facilities and the auxiliary and extension CPU Affiliated Renewable Energy Center, a center funded by the Philippine Department of Energy and the university that covers the whole Western Visayas region area, and laboratory and research facilities of the programs of mechanical engineering, civil engineering, electronics and communications engineering, electrical engineering, and the two pioneer programs in the country, the packaging engineering and software engineering. Later, a new floor was added to the structure which has now a total of four storeys.

A packaging testing center and laboratory facility which is the first of its kind in the Southeast Asian region, the CPU Philippine Center for Packaging Engineering (CPU PC-PET) – Packaging Engineering Laboratory, is located separately from the Engineering Building, but under the supervision and umbrella of the college's program of Packaging Engineering. The center is backed by the Philippine- Department of Science and Technology, the industry's Packaging Institute of the Philippines and a private sector's packaging advocate, Systemat-PackEDGE.

CPU PC-PET's construction on-time scheduled finishing in 2012 aligned with the first Philippine International Packiging Engineering convention, the Global Pack 2012, the first of its kind in the South East Asian Region. The center is a combination of the College of Engineering's Packaging Engineering department and the facilities of the Packaging Testing Laboratory and the Packaging Technology Resource Center (PTRC). It is backed by the Philippine Department of Science and Technology and the Packaging Institute of the Philippines.

The CPU Affiliated Renewable Energy Center (CPU AREC) which is housed at the Engineering building, was established in 1989 and is under the umbrella of the College of Engineering. It is jointly funded by Department of Energy (Philippines) and the university. The center covers the whole Western Visayan region. The Engineering Building on the other hand, was built through a 4 million peso loan from Asian Development Bank and Development Bank of the Philippines.

The sporting and library needs of the CPU College of Engineering students are served by the university's athletic and bibliothèque facilities.

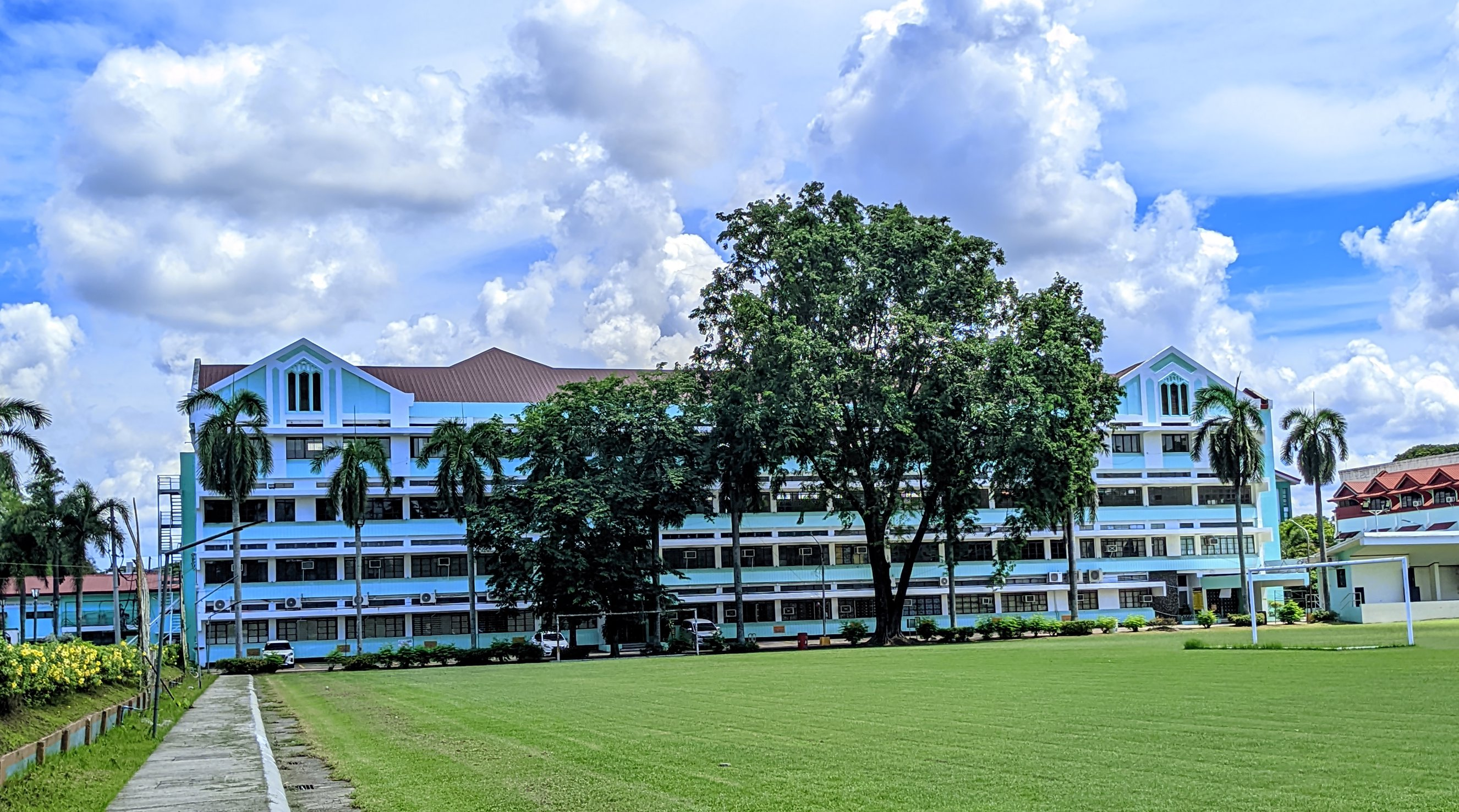
The Engineering Building view from the other side of the Big Field.

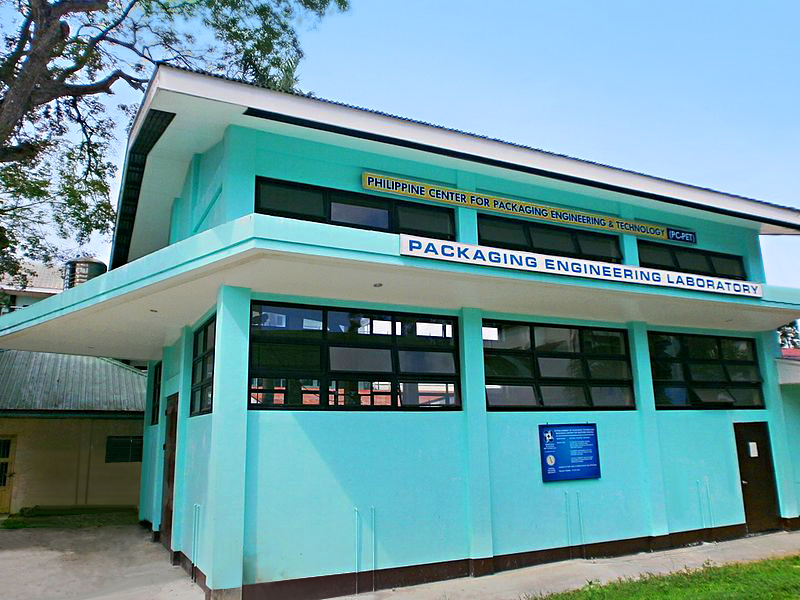
The CPU Philippine Center for Packaging Engineering (PC-PET).

The CPU-Affiliated Renewable Energy Center (AREC), the Heat Transfer Facility and some of the college's research and extension centers are housed inside the Engineering Building.

== Notable alumni ==
People associated with the college are called Centralians. The college maintains its own alumni association subsequent to the Central Philippine University Alumni Association. Notable people of the college include:

- Alfonso A. Uy - First President of Filipino-Chinese Chamber of Commerce and Industry from Visayas and Mindanao. He is also a recipient and awardee of the Dr. Jose Rizal Award for Excellence in Business and Commerce.
- Raymundo Jarque – Brigadier General in the Armed Forces of the Philippines.
- Dany Molina – Dean of the college and the first National President of the Philippine Association of Engineering Schools from outside of Manila since 1955.
