= Christianto Wibisono =

Indonesian writer-activist (1945–2021)

- Born: April 10, 1945; Jakarta, Java, Indonesia
- Died: July 22, 2021 (aged 76)
- Occupation: Business analyst

Christianto Wibisono (10 April 1945 – 22 July 2021), also known as Oey Kian Kok (simplified Chinese: 黄建国; traditional Chinese: 黃建國; pinyin: Huáng Jiànguó) was a Chinese Indonesian business analyst in Indonesia. His father was Oey Koan Gwee (Huang Guan-guo) and his mother was Lo Tjoan Nio (Luo Zhuan-niang).

== Early life ==
Wibisono was born in Jakarta, Java, Indonesia, and grew up in Semarang. He moved to Jakarta in 1964 to pursue a degree in law and social sciences (Fakultas Hukum dan Ilmu Pengetahuan Kemasyarakatan) at the University of Indonesia. On campus, he was active as an editor and writer for numerous publications from 1966 to 1970. In 1971, he co-founded Tempo weekly magazine but left it in 1973. He continued his study in social sciences (FISIP) at the University of Indonesia in 1974 and got his degree in 1978. As an activist in 1978, he strongly opposed the government's ban on press freedoms.

== Career ==
Wibosono co-founded TEMPO, a magazine considered the equivalent of "Time" in 1970, immediately following his graduation from the Graduate School of Political Science at the University of Indonesia.

From 1978 to 1983 he was appointed the Special Aide to the former Vice President of Indonesia, Adam Malik. In 1980 he established the Indonesian Business Data Center, a leading business consultant and data mining firm, while writing columns in Indonesia's news media such as Kompas and Suara Pembaruan among others. Wibisono is also the author of "The Imaginary Interview with Bung Karno" which discussed Indonesia's political regime in power throughout the nation's first and second presidential transition.

In 1998, Wibisono and his family relocated to Washington, D.C., U.S.A, where he continuously monitored the development of Indonesia and regional South East Asia, and bridged the gap between the regions and Capitol Hill. During his stay in the US, he managed to gain an offer by former Indonesian president Abdurrahman Wahid; for a top cabinet position of Coordinating Minister of Economic Affairs in June 2001, which he then declined.

He played a role in the establishment of Global Nexus Institute, a national Think tank dedicated to materializing the goal of positioning Indonesia as the world's potential leading economy in the present global shift of power from the West to the East.

== Death ==
Wibisono died in Jakarta on 22 July 2021, due to COVID-19 during the COVID-19 pandemic in Indonesia.

== Bibliography ==
- Suryadinata, Leo (1995), Prominent Indonesian Chinese: Biographical Sketches (3rd ed.), Singapore: Institute of Southeast Asian Studies, ISBN 978-981-3055-04-9.
