= Shangmatai =

Town in Wuqing District, Tianjin, China

Shangmatai Town 上马台镇
- Town
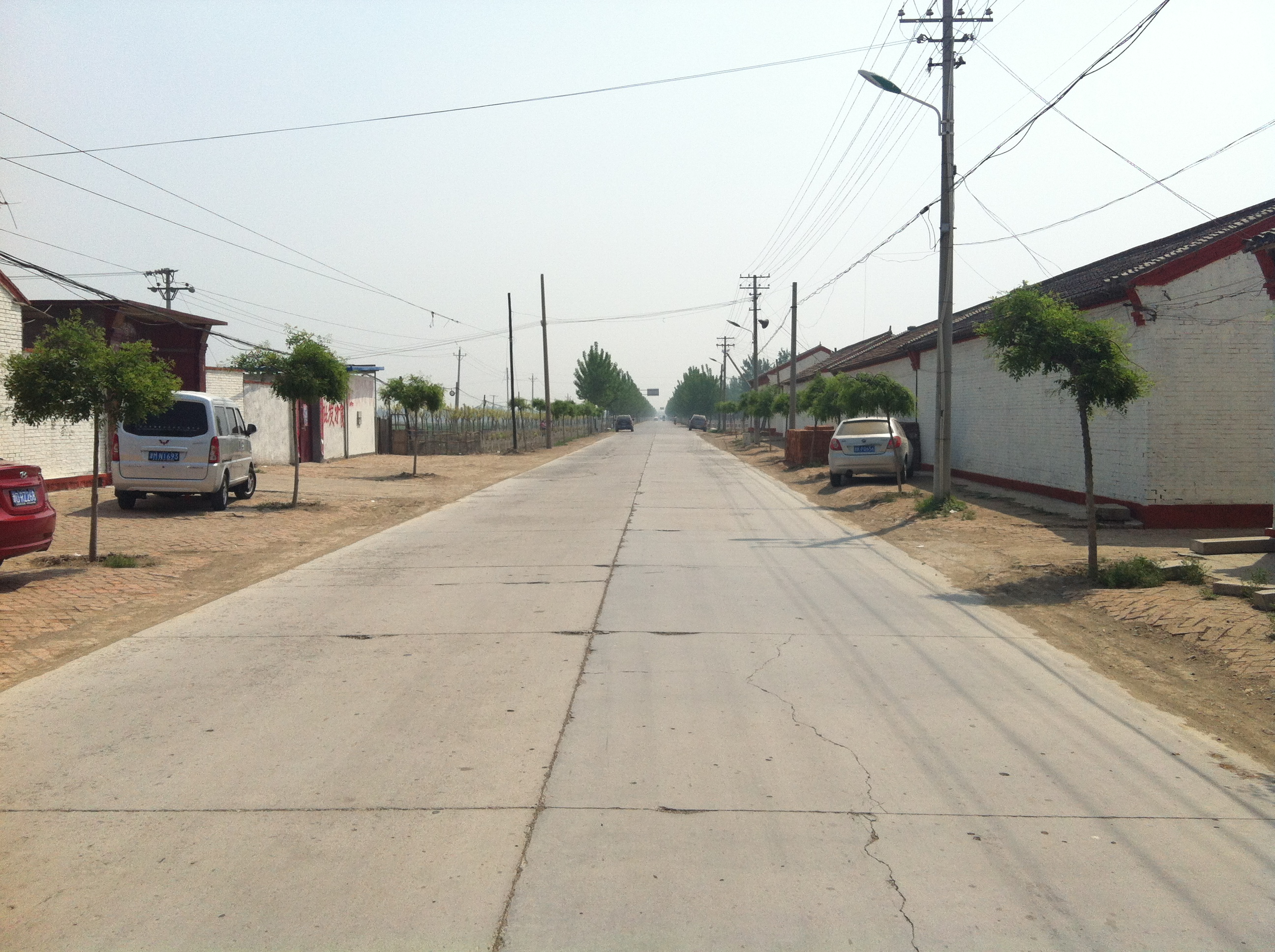
- Dongxuezhuang Village in Shangmatai Town

- Location within Tianjin Location within China
- Coordinates: 39°23′22″N 117°15′25″E
- Country: China
- Municipality: Tianjin
- District: Wuqing
- Village-level Divisions: 1 community 8 villages

Area
  - Total: 56.33 km^{2} (21.75 sq mi)
- Elevation: 5 m (16 ft)

Population (2010)
  - Total: 22,081
  - Density: 392.0/km^{2} (1,015/sq mi)
- Time zone: UTC+8 (CST)
- Postal code: 301729
- Area code: 022

Shangmatai Town (simplified Chinese: 上马台镇; traditional Chinese: 上馬台鎮; pinyin: Shàngmǎtái Zhèn) is a town situated in the east of Wuqing District, Tianjin, China. It shares border with Dahuangbao Town in the north. Erwangzhuang and Panzhuang Towns in the east, Dazhangzhuang and Xiditou Towns in the south, as well as Caozili and Meichang Towns in the west. The town is home to 22,081 people as of 2010.

Its name Shangmatai (Chinese: 上马台; lit. 'Get on Horse Platform') came into being in the Ming Dynasty, when Zhu Di, the then Prince of Yan, rode a horse into an upcoming battle around this region.

== Geography ==
Shangmatai Town sits at the southwest of the Longfeng River, with Beijing-Tianjin Expressway passing through its southwest. The town has an average altitude of 5 meters above the sea level.

== History ==
Timetable of Shangmatai Town
Year	Status	Part of
1957 - 1958	Within Kangyuzhuang Township	Wuqing County, Hebei
1958 - 1973	Within Meichang People's Commune	Wuqing County, Hebei
1973 - 1983	Within Meichang People's Commune	Wuqing County, Tianjin
1983 - 2000	Shangmatai Township	Wuqing County, Tianjin
2000 - 2001	Shangmatai Township	Wuqing District, Tianjin
2001–present	Shangmatai Town	Wuqing District, Tianjin

== Administrative divisions ==
As of the year 2022, Shangmatai Town covered these 1 residential community and 8 villages:

=== Residential community ===
- Longtai Jiayuan (隆泰家园)

=== Villages ===
- Weijiabao (魏家堡)
- Wanglaozhuang (王老庄)
- Beiwucun (北五村)
- Dongxuezhuang (东薛庄)
- Shangmatai (上马台)
- Xi'anzi (西安子)
- Wangsanzhuang (王三庄)
- Yangjiahe (杨家河)

== See also ==
- List of township-level divisions of Tianjin
