= Caozili =

Town in Wuqing District, Tianjin, China

Caozili Town 曹子里镇
- Town
- Location in Tianjin Caozili Town (China)
- Coordinates: 39°24′46″N 117°07′50″E
- Country: China
- Municipality: Tianjin
- District: Wuqing
- Village-level Divisions: 1 community 33 villages

Area
  - Total: 51.93 km^{2} (20.05 sq mi)
- Elevation: 7 m (23 ft)

Population (2010)
  - Total: 27,133
  - Density: 522.5/km^{2} (1,353/sq mi)
- Time zone: UTC+8 (CST)
- Postal code: 301727
- Area code: 022

Caozili Town (simplified Chinese: 曹子里镇; traditional Chinese: 曹子里鎮; pinyin: Cáozilǐ Zhèn), is one of the 24 towns of Wuqing District, Tianjin, China. It borders Dajianchang and Cuihuangkou Towns to its north, Dahuangbao and Shangmatai Towns to its east, Meichang Town to its south, and Xuguantun Subdistrict to its west. In the year 2010, it had a reported population of 27,133.

== Geography ==
Caozili Town is situated on the banks of Longfeng River, with an elevation of 7 meters.

== History ==
Timetable of Caozili Town.
Year	Status	Within
1949 – 1950	Part of 3rd and 14th Districts	Wuqing County, Hebei
1950 – 1952	Part of 6th and 7th Districts	Wuqing County, Hebei
1952 – 1957	Part of 4th District	Wuqing County, Hebei
1957 – 1958	Part of Shijinzhuang Township	Wuqing County, Hebei
1958 – 1961	Part of Dahuangbao People's Commune	Wuqing County, Hebei
1961 – 1973	Shijinzhuang People's Commune	Wuqing County, Hebei
1973 – 1982	Shijinzhuang People's Commune	Wuqing County, Tianjin
1982 – 1983	Caozili People's Commune	Wuqing County, Tianjin
1983 – 2000	Caozili Township	Wuqing County, Tianjin
2000 – 2013	Caozili Township	Wuqing District, Tianjin
2013 – present	Caozili Town	Wuqing District, Tianjin

== Administrative divisions ==
In 2022, Caozili Town has jurisdiction over 34 subdivisions: 1 residential community and 33 villages. They are compiled in the following list:

=== Residential community ===
- Xiangyang (向阳)

=== Villages ===
- Shijinzhuang (拾棉庄)
- Liudazhuang (六大庄)
- Liulizhuang (六里庄)
- Dabaimagang (大白马港)
- Xiaobaimagang (小白马港)
- Qiuzhuang (邱庄)
- Dagaokou (大高口)
- Xiaogaokou (小高口)
- Dongliudian (东柳店)
- Shangyinzhuang (上殷庄)
- Caozili Houjie
  (曹子里后街)
- Caozili Qianjie
  (曹子里前街)
- Liuxiaozhuang (六小庄)
- Yangjianchang (杨碱厂)
- Zhujiamatou (朱家码头)
- Lujuehe (陆掘河)
- Nanjuehe (南掘河)
- Liushanzhuang (刘山庄)
- Xijuehe (西掘河)
- Beijuehe (北掘河)
- Juehedian (掘河店)
- Dongjuehe (东掘河)
- Juehewangzhuang (掘河王庄)
- Xiliudian (西柳店)
- Caiyangzhuang (蔡杨庄)
- Qiantai (前台)
- Houtai (后台)
- Xiaodian (肖店)
- Guojiazhuang (郭家庄)
- Chabaihu (汊百户)
- Housuzhuang (后苏庄)
- Qiansuzhuang (前苏庄)
- Nanqizhuang (南齐庄)

== See also ==
- List of township-level divisions of Tianjin
