= Yinrun Huang =

Chinese influencer living in the UK

- Born: Shanghai, China
- Spouse: IamHappyGoLukey

Instagram information
- Page: Yinrun Huang
- Followers: 609,000

TikTok information
- Page: Yinrun Huang
- Followers: 1.4 million

YouTube information
- Channel: Yinrun's World
- Years active: 2 years
- Subscribers: 1.88 million
- Views: 2.32 billion
- Last updated: October 2026

Yinrun Huang is a Chinese reality television star and social media influencer. She is best known for her appearance on the twentieth series of the ITV reality series, Big Brother UK. She is also known for her large following on TikTok and YouTube.

== Career ==
In 2023, she applied and was a housemate on the twentieth series of Big Brother UK. She reached the final, placing fourth overall and leaving to a positive reaction from the live crowd. She went on to make recurring appearances on the Big Brother's after show, Big Brother: Late & Live as a guest. She was a guest on an episode of the 2026, after show Big Brother: The Group Chat.

In 2023, she was a contestant on The 1% Club. Her episode was teased heavily by ITV before it was broadcast. In November, 2024, she was a guest on The Kelly Clarkson Show alongside her husband, Luke, where they were interviewed on their viral proposal video.

Despite having no social media prior to her appearance on Big Brother, Huang created various social media accounts, opening a TikTok and YouTube channel, amassing over 1 million followers on both platforms and over 1 billion total views. She has since worked alongside many major companies, including Disney.

== Personal life ==
Huang was born in Shanghai, China, she speaks Chinese and English. She moved to Manchester, England in 2021. She currently lives in Harrogate, North Yorkshire. Huang met her husband Luke, after moving to England. In August, 2024, he proposed to Huang in Chinese while pretending to be recording a TikTok dance trend, the proposal video went viral.

== Filmography ==
Television
Year	Title	Role	Notes
2023	Big Brother UK series 20	Herself; housemate	4th place, 36 episodes
2023-2025	Big Brother: Late & Live	Herself; ex-housemate	Recurring role
2023	The 1% Club	Herself; contestant	1 episode
2024	The Kelly Clarkson Show	Herself; guest	1 episode
2025	Bro's in Control	Herself; contestant	1 episode
2026	Big Brother: The Group Chat	Herself; guest	1 episode
