= Hoàng Lập Ngôn =

Vietnamese painter

Hoàng Lập Ngôn (1910 in Hanoi – 16 March 2006) was a Vietnamese painter. His son is the painter Hoàng Hồng Cẩm.

Portrait of Vũ Cao Đàm, 1948
