= Hoàng Đăng Huệ =

Vietnamese officer (1932–2014)

- 黃登惠
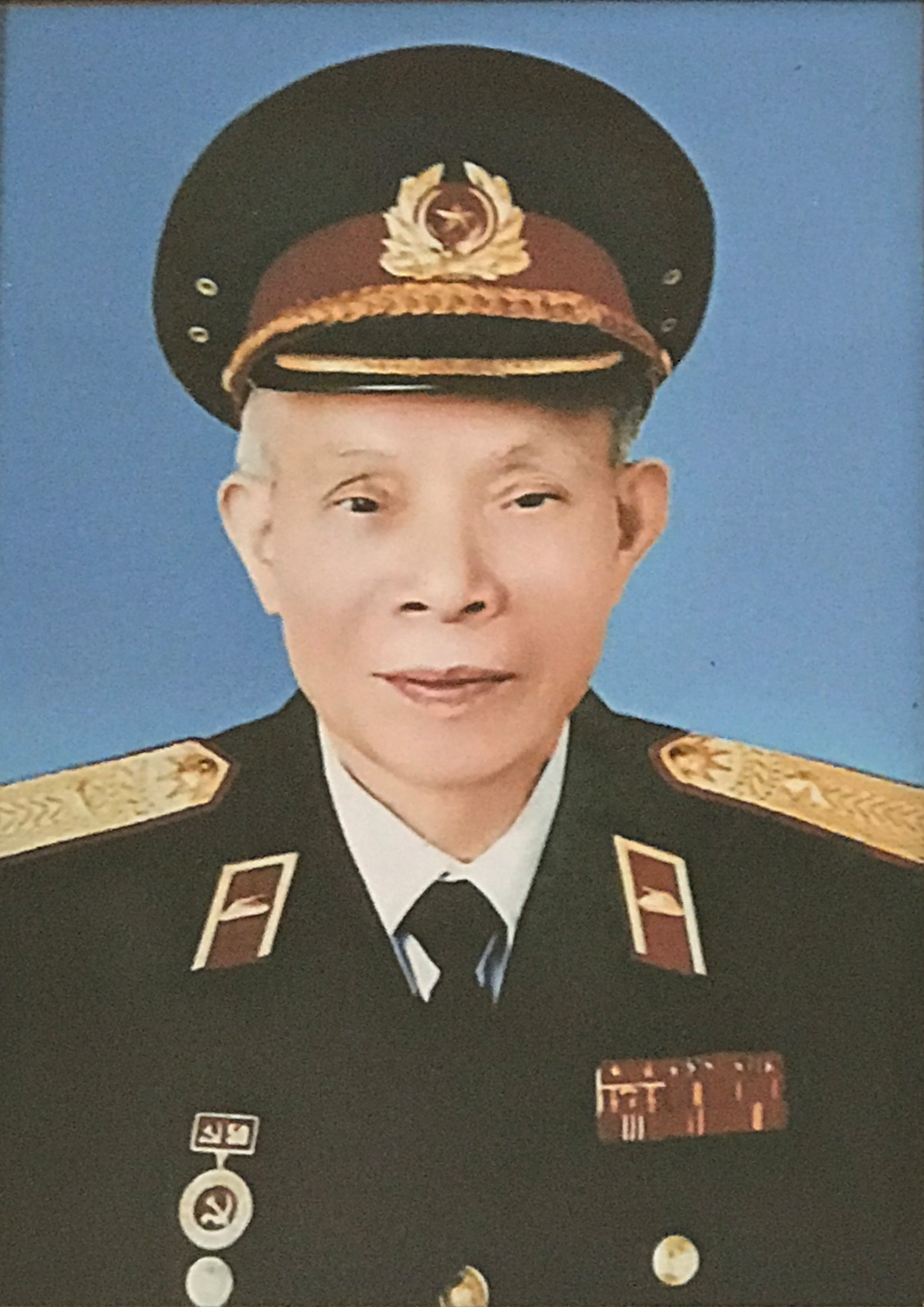
- Born: 1932; Yen Thanh, Yên Thế, Nam Định, French Indochina
- Died: December 31, 2014 (aged 82)
- Military career
- Allegiance: Vietnam
- Branch: Vietnam People's Army
- Rank: Major General
- Unit: Armoured Corps
- Conflicts: Indochina Wars

Hoàng Đăng Huệ (1932 – December 31, 2014) was a Vietnamese military officer. At the time of his retirement from the Vietnam People's Army, he had achieved the rank of major general. Huệ served as the Secretary of the Communist Party Committee and Deputy Commander for Political Affairs of the Armored Corps within the Ministry of National Defense of Vietnam.

== Biography ==
Huệ was born in the Yen Thanh commune, Yên Thế district Nam Định province of French Indochina. Throughout the Indochina wars against first France and later the United States, Huệ was a crucial political ally of Ho Chi Minh. Serving in as both a fighter in the Viet Minh and an officer in the Vietnam People's Army, Huệ was responsible for the personal safety of the General Secretary of the Communist Party of Vietnam.

Huệ has received numerous state and party honours in recognition for his service. The People's Council of Khánh Hòa province named a street after him in the city of Nha Trang.

== Career ==
- Squad leader within the Viet Minh formation led by Phan Đình Giót.
- Head of Security for President Ho Chi Minh and General Headquarters.
- Secretary of the Party Committee
- Deputy Commander for Political Affairs
- Chairman of the Housing Council of the Armoured Corps Command.
