= Hoàng Hồng Cẩm =

Vietnamese painter

Hoàng Hồng Cẩm (1959 in Hanoi – 27 October 2011), was a Vietnamese painter. He has exhibited solo paintings in many countries. He is the son of painter Hoàng Lập Ngôn.

Cẩm graduated from Hanoi Industrial Fine Arts College in 1983. He is a member of the Hanoi Fine Arts Association and the Vietnam Fine Arts Association.

== Exhibitions ==
- Exhibitions in Hanoi (1991, 1992, 1994, 1996)
- "100 Years of Vietnamese Fine Arts," Singapore (1994)
- Cicada Gallery, Singapore (1996)
- Beijing, China (1996)
- Vietnamese Contemporary Fine Arts: "The Winding River," Washington DC, United States (1996)
- Sydney, Australia (1998)
- Brussels, Belgium, European Union: "Vietnam in 20th Century, Illustrative Arts and Audio Video from 1935 up to now" (1998–2000)
- Group Exhibition, "Vietnam Now," Washington DC, USA (2005)
