= John K.C. Ng =

Chinese-Filipino businessman and philanthropist

John K.C. Ng 黄呈辉 (1939–2013) is a Chinese-Filipino businessman and philanthropist. He is the Chairman of the Cathay Group of Companies, a diversified conglomerate with business interests in real estate, property development, steel manufacturing, tile manufacturing and computer retail. Ng made his fortune in steel manufacturing after he expanded his father's business when the latter died. He was appointed by former President Gloria Macapagal Arroyo as the Special Envoy for Chinese Affairs. He was the recipient of the 4th Dr. Jose P. Rizal Awards for Excellence Lifetime Achievement Award. He is also the past President of the Federation of the Filipino-Chinese Chamber of Commerce and Industry, Inc. (FFCCCII), and a chairman of the Board of Trustees of Chiang Kai Shek College.

== Education ==
John Ng finished his secondary education at the Chiang Kai Shek College.

== Professional profile ==
Ng immigrated from China in 1949 when he was 11 years old. At 26, the year after he got married, he took over the business. He then expanded the business and ventured into steel manufacturing, putting up Pacific Steel and Cathay Metal.

He later expanded into property development by establishing Cathay Land, Inc., in 1994. The company has over 500 hectares of landbank in Calabarzon and Metro Manila. His son, Jeffrey Ng, is heading the property businesses. Businesses John Ng own include PC Express, a leading computer retail shop, and Eurotile.

He was the presidential advisor of President Joseph Ejercito Estrada on the steel industry, and was appointed by President Gloria Macapagal Arroyo as the special envoy for Chinese affairs because of his strong ties to both mainland China and Chinese Filipino businessmen. He was the past president of the FCCCII and spearheaded the construction of hundreds of school buildings in barangays all over the country, and the donation of homes to the less privileged through Gawad Kalinga.

== Family ==
Ng's daughter Angeline is married to Lucio Tan’s son Mike Tan.
