= Chin-Lung Huang =

Taiwanese painter and professor

Chin-Lung, Huang (黃進龍, 1963-) is a Taiwanese painter, professor of College of Arts at National Taiwan Normal University, NTNU (國立臺灣師範大學).

Huang grew up in Donggang, Pingtong, a fishing village in southern Taiwan. He has loved painting since his childhood and has been especially skilled in portraying fishing boats and harbor themes. Topped with his personal passion and talent, his solid training in painting during student years has earned him numerous awards. In his senior year at university Huang has already won the first prize of the National Art Exhibition (全國美展) and a permanent exemption from prior screening for watercolor works. After graduation he has won the Medal of Chinese Literature and Arts (中國文藝獎章) from the 38th Chinese Writer's & Artist's Association 中國文藝協會 and the Golden Goblet Award from the Chinese Art Society for his work in watercolor.

In recent years Huang has been inspired by the fluid and transforming nature of globalization to use the oriental philosophy familiar to him as his creative source. His paintings demonstrate a unique style rich in oriental charms. The ethereality, elegance, whimsicality, and capriciousness demonstrated in his solo exhibitions “Oriental Lyricism,” “Summit Images of Taiwan,” and “Eastern Wind” embody the sentiments of the Orient.

Huang is currently the President of the Chinese Asia-Pacific Watercolor Association (中華亞太水彩藝術協會) and the Honorary President of Taiwan International Watercolor Society. Huang has held 15 solo exhibitions from 1992 to 2016 and participated in numerous co-exhibitions in Taiwan and abroad.

He has published catalogs including “An Album of Huang Chin-Lung’s Paintings”, “An Album of ‘the Language of Flowers,’” “An Album of ‘Drifting Mind, Love for Hometown: Huang Chin-Lung's Solo Exhibition,’” “An Album of ‘Constructive Images of Fishing: Huang Chin-Lung's Solo Exhibition’” “An Album of ‘Constructive Images of Fishing: Huang Chin-Lung's Solo Exhibition,’” “An Album of ‘Glamour of Color, Rhythm of Ink: Huang Chin-Lung's Solo Exhibition,’” “An Album of ‘Flowing Color of the Invisible Ink,’” “An Album of ‘Lyricism: Huang Chin-Lung's Solo Exhibition,’” “An Album of ‘Oriental Lyricism: Huang Chin-Lung's Solo Exhibition,’” “An Album of ‘Summit Images of Taiwan: Huang Chin-Lung's Thematic Solo Exhibition,’” and “An Album of ‘Eastern Wind: Huang Chin-Lung's Solo Exhibition.’” He has also produced “The Art of Watercolor,” a DVD set of six discs with the Chinese Television System, 中華電視公司 and HotSound Co., 2016"Abandon/ Gain: East-West Artistic Encounter", He has also published books on the techniques of watercolor including “Analysis of Watercolor Techniques” and “Analysis of Sketch Techniques.”

== Positions ==
- professor, the College of Arts, NTNU.
- Honorary President, Taiwan International Watercolor Society (台灣國際水彩畫協會)
- President, Chinese Asia-Pacific Watercolor Association (中華亞太水彩藝術協會)
- Honorary Member, Australian Watercolour Institute
- Visiting Scholar, Pennsylvania State University (August 2009-August 2010)
- International Jury Member, American Watercolor Society, 2012

== Exhibitions ==
- 2016 "Abandon / Gain: East - West Artistic Encounter" Chin-Lung Huang Solo Exhibition (Hwang Gallery Inc., New York City)
- 2011 "Drifting Beauty: Falls and Flowers" Chin-Lung Huang Solo Exhibition" (Da-Ku Cultural Arts Center, Taichung)

     "Constructing the New Oriental Painting" Chin-Lung Huang Solo Exhibition 2000-2011 (Pingtung Art Gallery)

- 2009 "Eastern Wind: Huang Chin-Lung's Solo Exhibition" Seoul (Jung Gallery, Seoul, South Korea)
- 2008 "Summit Images of Taiwan" Thematic Solo Exhibition (Gallery of Cathay United Bank, Taipei)
- 2006 "Huang Chin-Lung's Solo Exhibition in 2006" (Art Space of Land Bank Headquarters, Taipei)

     "Oriental Lyricism: Huang Chin-Lung's Solo Exhibition" (Da-Ku Cultural and Art Center, Taichung)

- 2005 "Lyricism: Huang Chin-Lung's Solo Exhibition" (Creative Art Center of Vanung University)
- 2002 "Flowing Color of the Invisible Ink" Solo Exhibition (Gallery of Cathay United Bank, Taipei)
- 2000 "Glamour of Color, Rhythm of Ink: Huang Chin-Lung's Solo Exhibition" (Howard Salon, Kaohsiung)
- 1999 "Constructive Images of Fishing: Huang Chin-Lung's Solo Exhibition" (Fairmate Gallery, Taipei)
- 1998 "Conversation between Transparent and Non-transparent: Huang Chin-Lung's Watercolor Solo Exhibition" (Taitung Social Education Center)
- 1997 "Drifting Mind, Love for Hometown: Huang Chin-Lung's Solo Exhibition" (Cultural Center of Pingtung County)
- 1993 "World of Flowers" Thematic Exhibition (Capital Arts Center, Taipei)
- 1992 The First Solo Exhibition (Gaoke Gallery, Taipei)

== Publication ==
- 2017 “Nude Languages in the Art of Chin-Lung Huang” (Zhejiang People's Fine Arts Publishing House, Hang Zhou, )
- 2016"Abandon/ Gain: East-West Artistic Encounter"
- 2011 "The Taiwan Artists 100 Years- Chin-Lung Huang"
- 2011 An Album of "Drifting Beauty: Falls and Flowers" (Da-Ku Cultural Arts Center, Taichung)
- 2009 A Picture Book "Albert's First Flight" (Heryin Books)
- 2009 An Album of "Eastern Wind: Huang Chin-Lung's Solo Exhibition" (Jung Gallery, Seoul)
- 2008 An Album of "Summit Images of Taiwan: Huang Chin-Lung's Thematic Solo Exhibition"
- 2006 An Album of "Oriental Lyricism: Huang Chin-Lung's Solo Exhibition"
- 2005 An Album of "Lyricism: Huang Chin-Lung's Solo Exhibition”
- 2005 DVD Set of "The Art of Watercolor" (Chinese Television System & HotSound Co.)
- 2002 An Album of "Flowing Color of the Invisible Ink"
- 2000 "The Watercolor" (San-Min Book Co., Ltd)
- 2000 An Album of "Glamour of Color, Rhythm of Ink: Huang Chin-Lung's Solo Exhibition"
- 1999 An Album of "Constructive Images of Fishing: Huang Chin-Lung's Solo Exhibition"
- 1997 An Album of "Drifting Mind, Love for Hometown: Huang Chin-Lung's Solo Exhibition"
- 1996 "Analysis of Sketch Techniques" (Yi-Fong-Tang Publishing Co., Ltd)
- 1993 An Album of “the Language of Flowers”
- 1992 "Analysis of Watercolor Techniques"
- 1992 An Album of Huang Chin-Lung’s Paintings

== See also ==
- Taiwanese art
