= Ruthlane Uy Asmundson =

American politician

Mayor, City of Davis
- In office 2008 – June 2010
- Succeeded by: Joe Krovoza

Personal details
- Education: Adamson University; Wilkes University; University of California Davis

Ruthlane Uy Asmundson (née Uy, born September 21, 1945) served as mayor of the City of Davis, California from 2004 to 2006 and again from 2008 to 2010. A native of Gamu, Isabela, Philippines, Asmundson was the first female Filipino immigrant to be elected into the position of mayor in an American city.

== Academic career and personal life ==
In 1968, Asmundson graduated with a BS in chemistry from Adamson University, a private Catholic institution in Manila. She went on to become a Fulbright Scholar in the US, earning an MS degree in chemistry from Wilkes University and a PhD in Agricultural Chemistry from University of California Davis in 1972, again as a Fulbright Scholar. She subsequently returned to the Philippines to teach at Adamson University.

On her return to the Philippines to teach, Ruthlane was accompanied by Vigfus Asmundson, a prominent lawyer in Davis who became the city mayor in 1970. During their time in the Philippines, he proposed, and the pair wed following their arrival back in the United States, during Vigfus's term as city mayor. The Asmundsons had four children themselves, and also raised two children of Vigfus's sister, who died of breast cancer in 1990. With the encouragement of her husband, Ruthlane entered local politics herself. Vigfus was diagnosed with Parkinson's disease in his later years and died on April 28, 2003.

== Political career ==
Asmundson was first elected to the City Council in 2002 and then reelected in 2006. She served as mayor pro tempore until 2008, when she took over as mayor. In her first try at local politics in 2002, she garnered the highest number of votes among her fellow candidates. Hence, she became mayor pro-tempore from 2002 to 2004 and sat as mayor from 2004 to 2006. As mayor, Asmundson has been an advocate for stronger sister city relations throughout her tenure. Since her election, she had inked sister city relations with 4 cities in Asia, two of which are in the Philippines Los Baños, Laguna and Muñoz, Nueva Ecija.

Asmundson regularly visits the Philippines and has provided assistance to projects in her hometown. The Uy family was responsible for building and furnishing a community library in Barangay Mabini Gamu, Isabela in 1998. Since the early 1990s, Asmundson has provided annual scholarships for needy students and supported faculty scholarship chairs in Adamson University.

== Awards ==
Asmundson was named Davis Citizen of the Year in 1990 and one of the "100 Most Influential Pinays in the U.S." in 2007. Her alma mater conferred on her the Outstanding Alumni of the Year in 2000 and 2003 for her contributions to the university and her achievements as a public official. She received the 2006 Pamana ng Filipino award. In 2010, she received a UC Davis College of Agricultural and Environmental Sciences Award of Distinction.
