= Che Yin Wong =

Hong Kong entrepreneur (born 1959)

Che Yin Wong (Chinese: 黄志贤; born 13 May 1959) is a Hong Kong businessman and philanthropist. He is the founder and chairman of Kong Fung International Group, a property conglomerate with interests in properties, hotels, mining and constructions.
