= Huang Wei (businessman) =

- Born: 1959 (age 66–67); China
- Education: Wenzhou Normal College
- Occupation: Real estate developer
- Known for: Founder, Xinhu Zhongbao

Huang Wei (Chinese: 黄伟; born 1959) is a Chinese real estate developer and billionaire.

== Biography ==
Huang Wei was born in 1959. He attended Wenzhou Normal College.

Huang Wei founded Xinhu Zhongbao, a real estate company based in Hangzhou.

He is married and lives in Hangzhou, China.
