= Alfonso A. Uy =

Filipino businessman (born 1939)

- Born: June 9, 1939 (age 87); Iloilo City, Philippines
- Education: Central Philippine University, Hua Siong College of Iloilo
- Occupation: Chinese-Filipino businessman
- Known for: First president of Federation of Filipino Chinese Chambers of Commerce & Industry who came from Visayas and Mindanao.

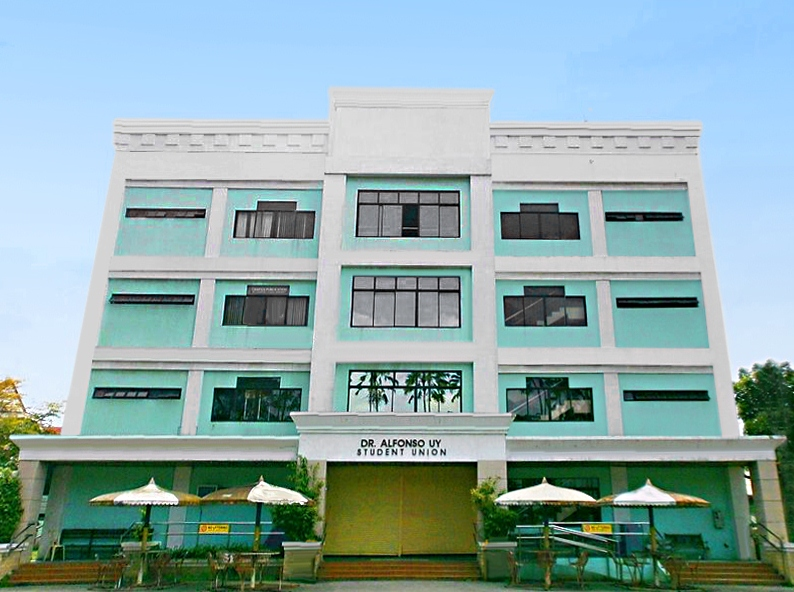
Alfonso A. Uy building, Central Philippine University

Alfonso A. Uy (Chinese: 黄祯谭) is a Filipino-Chinese businessman that holds numerous businesses in Iloilo. He is the former and first President of the Federation of Filipino Chinese Chambers of Commerce & Industry who came from the Visayas and Mindanao. He finished his Bachelor of Science in Chemical Engineering degree at Central Philippine University. He is also a recipient and awardee of the Dr. Jose Rizal Award for Excellence in Business and Commerce.

== See also ==
- Emilio Yap
- Edgar Sia
- Jonha Richman
