= Nancaicun =

Town in Tianjin, China

Nancaicun Town 南蔡村镇
- Town
- Location within Tianjin Location within China
- Coordinates: 39°28′52″N 117°00′37″E
- Country: China
- Municipality: Tianjin
- District: Wuqing
- Village-level Divisions: 4 communities 31 villages

Area
  - Total: 75.18 km^{2} (29.03 sq mi)
- Elevation: 9 m (30 ft)

Population (2010)
  - Total: 47,091
  - Density: 626.4/km^{2} (1,622/sq mi)
- Time zone: UTC+8 (CST)
- Postal code: 301709
- Area code: 022

Nancaicun Town (simplified Chinese: 南蔡村镇; traditional Chinese: 南蔡村鎮; pinyin: Náncàicūn Zhèn) is a town on the north of Wuqing District, Tianjin, China. It borders Daliang Town in its north, Cuihuangkou and Dajianchang Towns in its east, Xuguantun and Dongpuwa Subdistricts in its south, as well as Sicundian and Damengzhuang Towns in its west. Its total population was 47,091 as of 2010.

Its name came from Nancai Village, which host the town's government. The village used to be part of a larger settlement named Caicun, which was named after Cai family who founded the settlement in the Song dynasty. During the Yuan dynasty, renovation of the Grand Canal opened a waterway that crossed Caicun, dividing it into Nancaicun and Beicaicun.

== History ==
Timeline of Nancaicun Town
Years	Status	Part of
1958 - 1961	Nancaicun People's Commune	Wuqing County, Hebei
1961 - 1973	Nancaicun People's Commune; Beicaicun People's Commune	Wuqing County, Hebei
1973 - 1983	Nancaicun People's Commune; Beicaicun People's Commune	Wuqing County, Tianjin
1983 - 1995	Nancaicun Township; Beicaicun Township	Wuqing County, Tianjin
1995 - 2000	Nancaicun Town; Beicaicun Township	Wuqing County, Tianjin
2000 - 2001	Nancaicun Town; Beicaicun Township	Wuqing District, Tianjin
2001 - present	Nancaicun Town	Wuqing District, Tianjin

== Administrative divisions ==
In 2022, Nancaicun Town consists of 34 subdivisions, where 4 are residential communities and 31 are villages. They are listed below:

=== Residential communities ===
- Panshui Tingyuan (畔水庭苑)
- Liansheng Huayuan (莲胜花园)
- Panjing Tingyuan (畔景庭苑)
- Feicui Bandao (翡翠半岛)

=== Villages ===
- Nancaicun (南蔡村)
- Bajianfang (八间房)
- Dingfuzhuang (定福庄)
- Zhuangchang (砖厂)
- Zhangxinzhuang (张辛庄)
- Nieguantun (聂官屯)
- Dazicun (达子村)
- Anzhuang (安庄)
- Dingjiaquan (丁家圈)
- Shangfengzhuang (上丰庄)
- Beicaicun (北蔡村)
- Liuyangfang (刘羊坊)
- Zhangyangfang (张羊坊)
- Suyangfang (苏羊坊)
- Xiaoyangfang (肖羊坊)
- Hanyangfang (韩羊坊)
- Wengyangfang (翁羊坊)
- Jiubaihu (九百户)
- Nanjinzhuang (南靳庄)
- Dongxiaoliang (东小良)
- Xixiaoliang (西小良)
- Mapengwa (马棚洼)
- Babaihu (八百户)
- Xiyangfengzhuang (西杨凤庄)
- Caijiafang (蔡家坊)
- Xicuizhuang (西崔庄)
- Sanliqian (三里浅)
- Qibaihu (七百户)
- Tiaoliangwu (粜粮务)
- Liubaihu (六百户)
- Dawangfu (大王甫)

== See also ==
- List of township-level divisions of Tianjin
