= Meichang =

Town in Tianjin, China

Meichang Town 梅厂镇
- Town
- Location within Tianjin Location within China
- Coordinates: 39°22′08″N 117°11′40″E
- Country: China
- Municipality: Tianjin
- District: Wuqing
- Village-level Divisions: 4 communities 41 villages

Area
  - Total: 81.95 km^{2} (31.64 sq mi)
- Elevation: 5 m (16 ft)

Population (2010)
  - Total: 35,033
  - Density: 427.5/km^{2} (1,107/sq mi)
- Time zone: UTC+8 (CST)
- Postal code: 301701
- Area code: 022

Meichang Town (simplified Chinese: 梅厂镇; traditional Chinese: 梅廠鎮; pinyin: Méichǎng Zhèn) is a town situated on the south side of Wuqing District, Tianjin, China. It borders Xuguantun Subdistrict and Caozili Town in the north, Shangmatai Town in the east, Dazhangzhuang Town in the south, as well as Xiazhuzhuang and Yangcun Subdistricts in the west. It has 35,033 inhabitants under its administration as of 2010.

Its name Meichang (Chinese: 梅厂; lit. 'Mei's Shack') came into existence during the Song dynasty, when a family with the surname Mei first settled in the region.

== Geography ==
Yun Donggan Channel passes through Meichang Town. The town is connected to Jingjin Expressway and Binbao Expressway. Its average elevation is 5 meters above the sea level.

== History ==
Timetable of Meichang Town
Years	Status	Under
1957 - 1958	Meichang Township	Wuqing County, Hebei
1958 - 1973	Meichang People's Commune	Wuqing County, Hebei
1973 - 1974	Meichang People's Commune	Wuqing County, Tianjin
1974 - 1983	Meichang People's Commune; Niezhuangzi People's Commune	Wuqing County, Tianjin
1983 - 1991	Meichang Township; Niezhuangzi Township	Wuqing County, Tianjin
1991 - 2000	Meichang Town; Niezhuangzi Town	Wuqing County, Tianjin
2000 - 2001	Meichang Town; Niezhuangzi Town	Wuqing District, Tianjin
2001 - present	Meichang Town	Wuqing District, Tianjin

== Administrative divisions ==
At the end of 2022, Meichang Town comprises 45 subdivisions, consisting of 4 residential communities and 41 villages. They are listed below:

=== Residential communities ===
- Xinmei Fuyuan (馨梅福苑)
- Tian'an Fuyuan (天安福源)
- Lanhu Jun (蓝湖郡)
- Fuyuan Jingji Qu (福源经济区)

=== Villages ===
- Guoluo Zhuang (郭罗庄)
- Bei Wangping (北王平)
- Baidian (稗甸)
- Liuzhifeng (六指堼)
- Shuang Zhuang (双庄)
- Shen Zhuang (沈庄)
- Tangfang (塘坊)
- Shuangmiao (双庙)
- Xiwang Zhuang (西汪庄)
- Wangque Zhuang (王瘸庄)
- Xiaoyao Zhuang (小姚庄)
- Xiaohou Zhuang (小侯庄)
- Yangheng Zhuang (杨恒庄)
- Zhangda Zhuang (张大庄)
- Dongchen Zhuang (东陈庄)
- Cai Zhuang (蔡庄)
- Zhou Zhuang (周庄)
- Wanxin Zhuang (方辛庄)
- He Zhuang (郝庄)
- Nanren Zhuang (南任庄)
- Chenbiao Zhuang (陈标庄)
- Xiaolei Zhuang (小雷庄)
- Youzhuangzi (尤庄子)
- Xiaopan Zhuang (小潘庄)
- Zhanghai Zhuang (张海庄)
- Yaxu Zhuang (鸭徐庄)
- Yezhi (掖指)
- Nie Zhuang (聂庄)
- Danfeng (单堼)
- Wangtang Zhuang (王唐庄)
- Dongliang Zhuang (东梁庄)
- Donghe (董河)
- Wei Zhuang (韦庄)
- Xichen Zhuang (西陈庄)
- Huiguokou (灰锅口)
- Dawu Zhuang (大吴庄)
- Xiaowu Zhuang (小吴庄)
- Yangkuan Zhuang (杨宽庄)
- Zhengjia Zhuang (郑家庄)
- Gaimo (盖模)
- Wafang (瓦房)

== See also ==
- List of township-level divisions of Tianjin
