= Yunhexi Subdistrict =

Subdistrict of Tianjin, China

Yunhexi Subdistrict 运河西街道
- Subdistrict
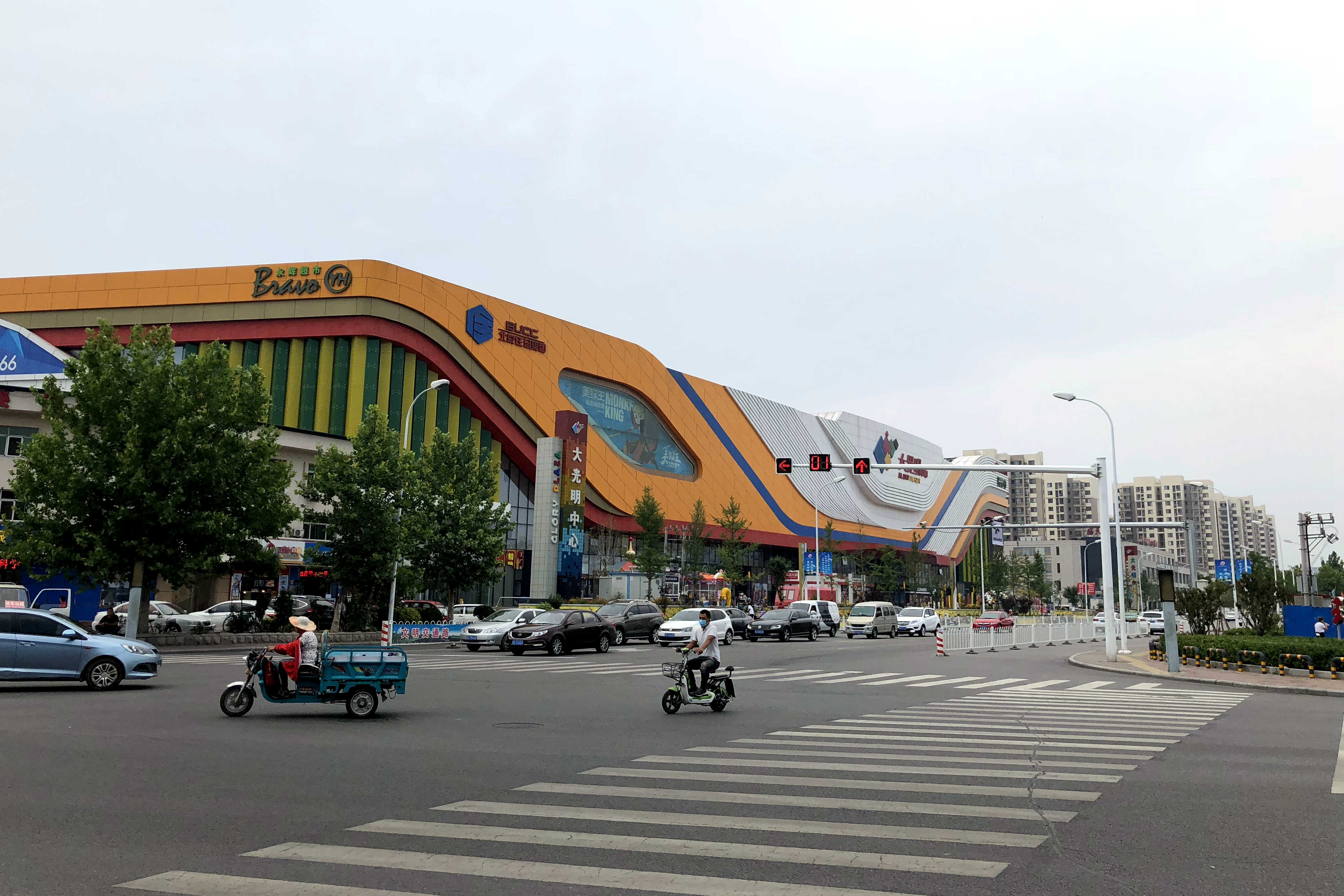
- Quanzhou Road within the subdistrict

- Location within Tianjin Location within China
- Coordinates: 39°22′09″N 117°03′11″E
- Country: China
- Municipality: Tianjin
- District: Wuqing
- Village-level Divisions: 17 communities

Area
  - Total: 7.8 km^{2} (3.0 sq mi)
- Elevation: 7 m (23 ft)

Population (2010)
  - Total: 68,661
  - Density: 8,800/km^{2} (23,000/sq mi)
- Time zone: UTC+8 (CST)
- Postal code: 301722
- Area code: 022

Yunhexi Subdistrict (simplified Chinese: 运河西街道; traditional Chinese: 運河西街道; pinyin: Yùnhéxī Jiēdào) is a subdistrict located in the south part of Wuqing District, Tianjin, China. It shares border Xuguantun Subdistrict to its north, Yangcun Subdistrict to its east, Huangzhuang Subdistrict to its south, and Dongpuwa Subdistrict to its west. It has a population of 68,661 as of 2010.

Its name Yunhexi (Chinese: 运河西; lit. 'Canal West') corresponds to its location on the west of the Grand Canal.

== Geography ==
Yunhexi Subdistrict is located along the western bank of the Grand Canal. It is bounded by Qianjin Avenue to the south and Cuiheng Road to the west. Its average elevation is seven meters above the sea level.

== Administrative divisions ==
As of 2022, Yunhexi Subdistrict has direct jurisdiction over these 17 residential communities:

- Heping Li (和平里)
- Quanzhou Dongli (泉州东里)
- Quanzhou Xili (泉州西里)
- Yi'an Dong (颐安东)
- Guangsha Dongli (广厦东里)
- Guangsha Nanli (广厦南里)
- Guangsha Beili (广厦北里)
- Xiyuan (西苑)
- Guangming (光明)
- Songhe Yuan (松鹤园)
- Fuyuan (福苑)
- Ping'an Li (平安里)
- Yongxin Huayuan (雍馨花园)
- Fumin Li (富民里)
- Bosheng Yuan (博盛园)
- Shangqing Wan (尚清湾)
- Qixian (栖仙)

== Galleries ==
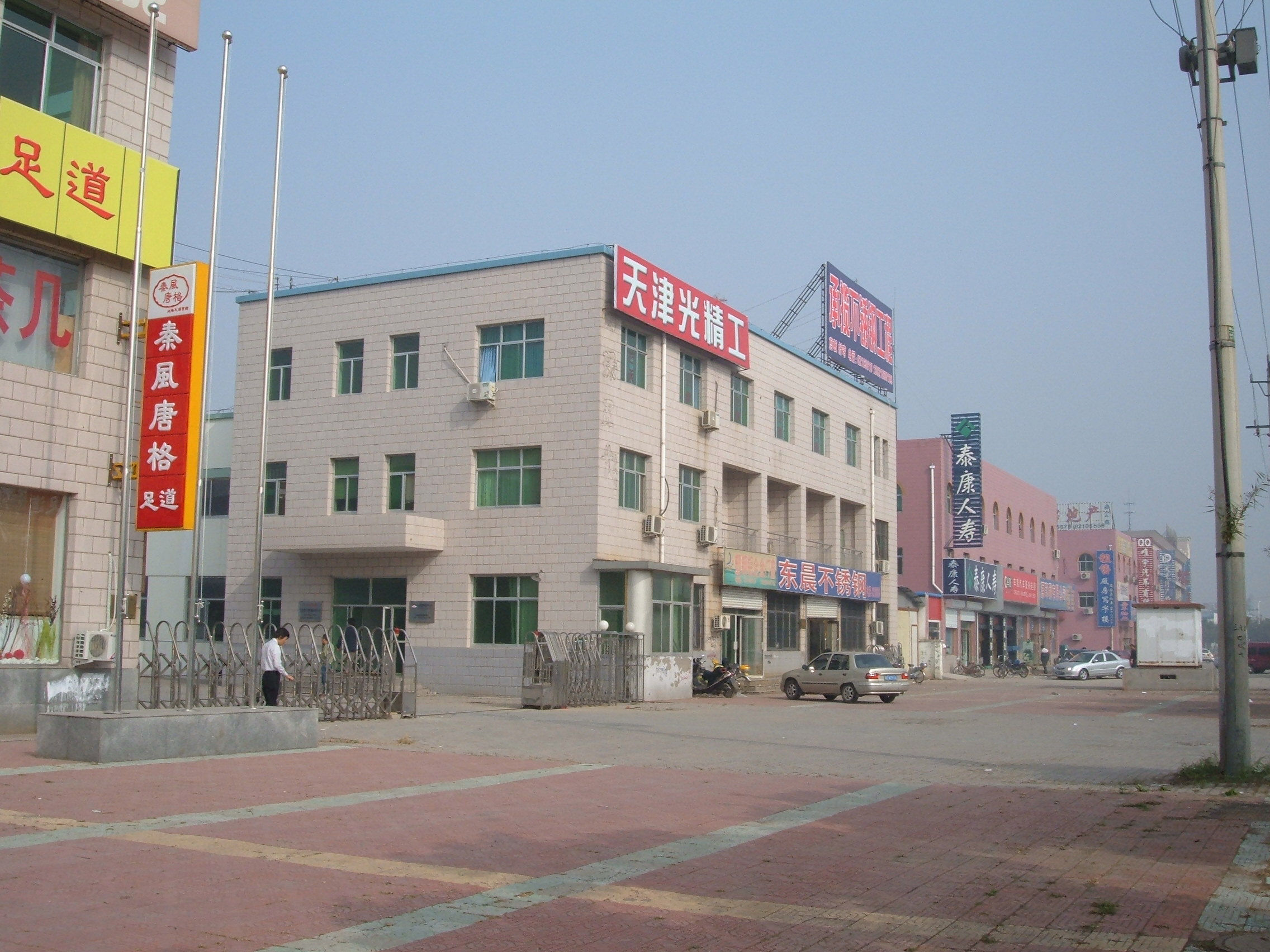
Quanxing Road

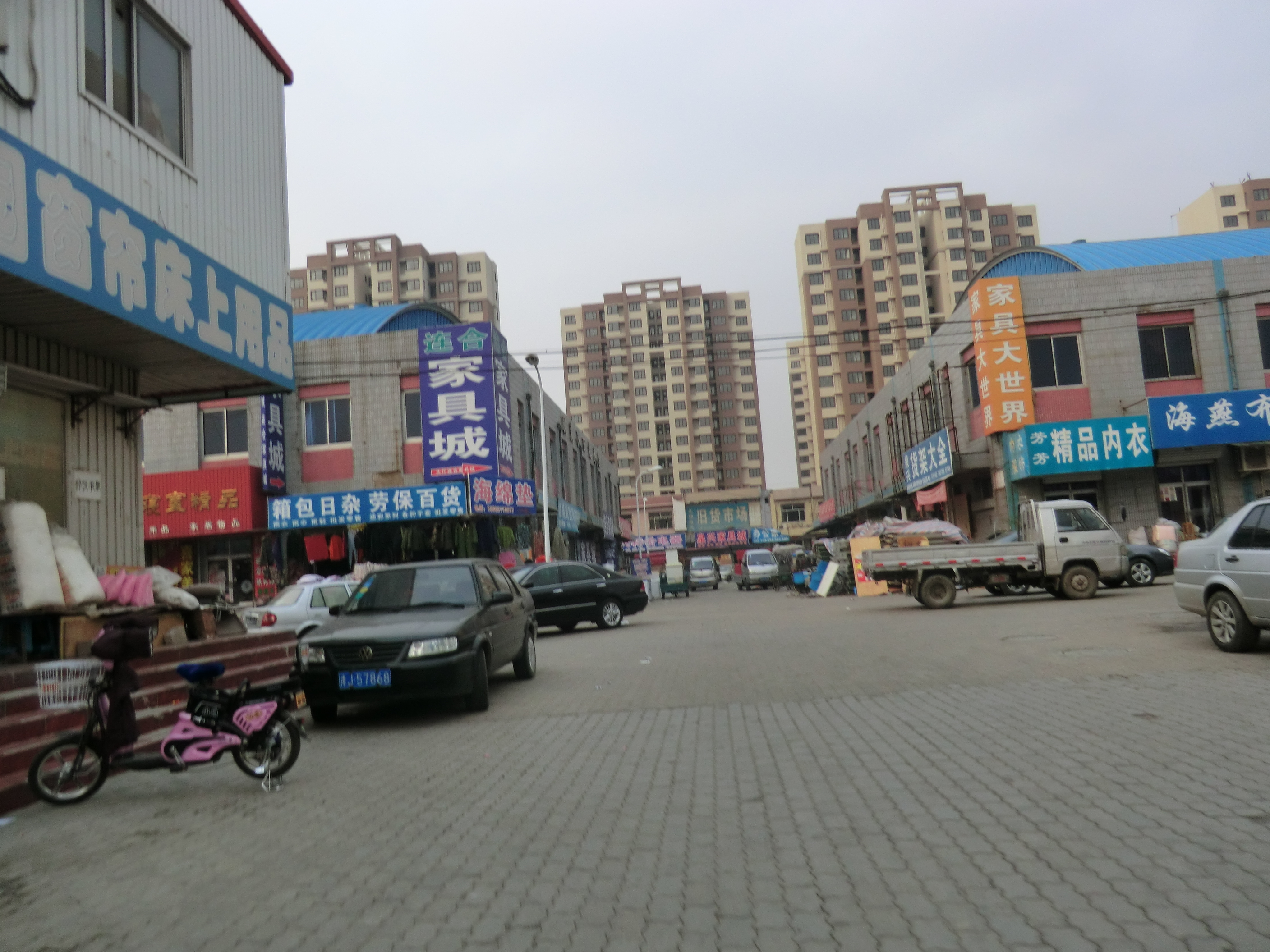
Shopping area in Bosheng Yuan Residential Community

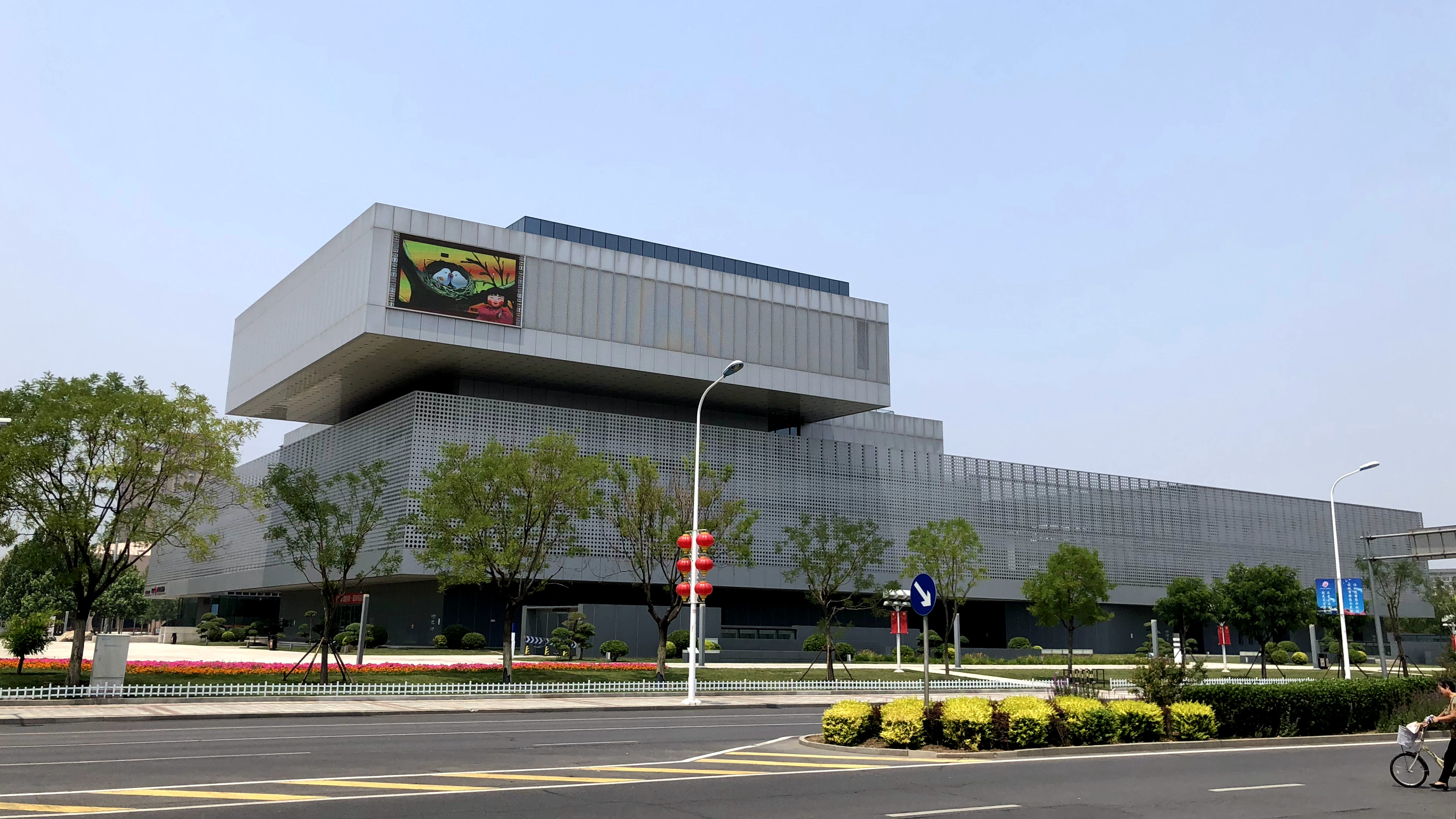
Cultural Center of Wuqing District

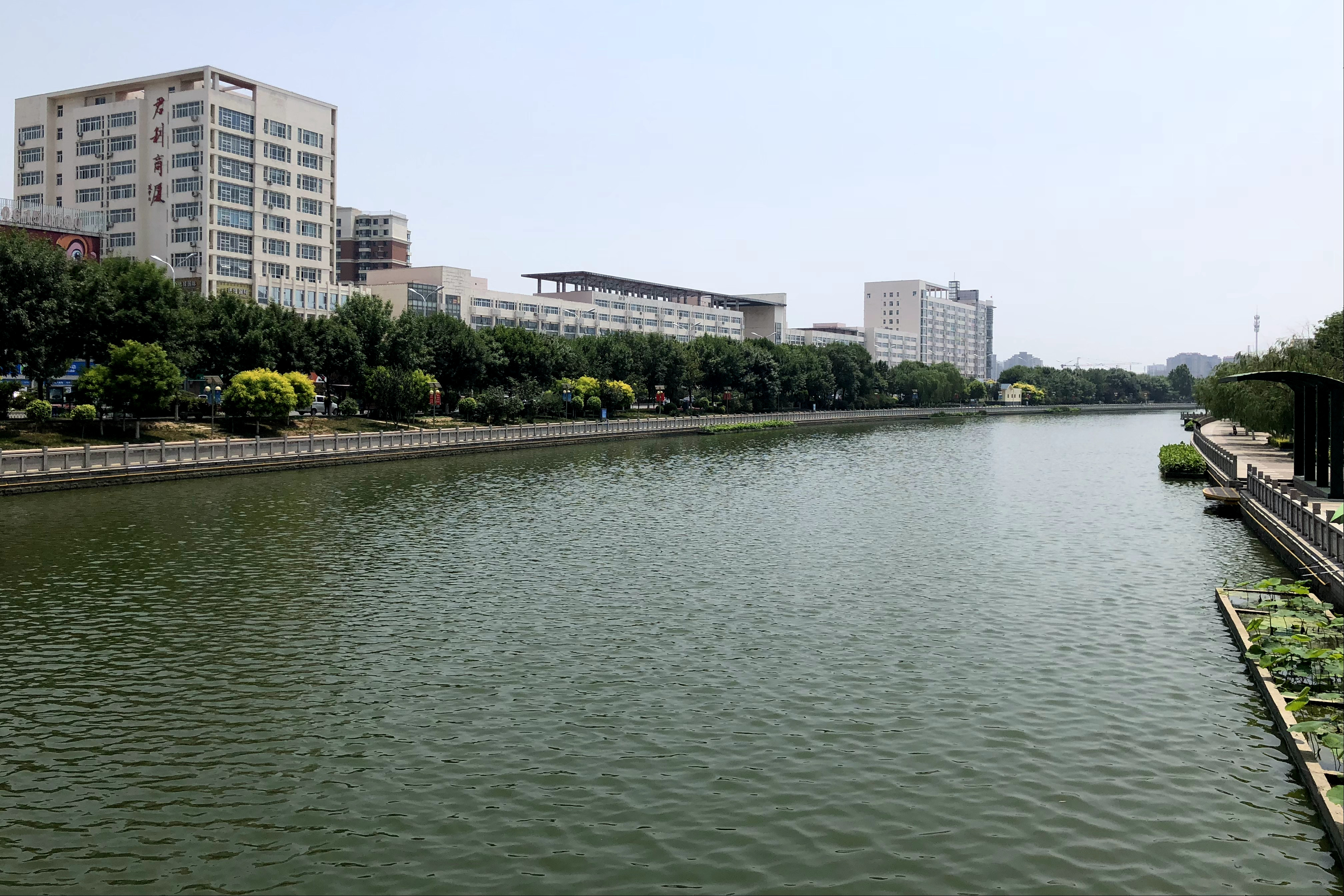
Section of the Grand Canal on the east of the subdistrict

== See also ==
- List of township-level divisions of Tianjin
