= Hebeitun =

Town in Wuqing District, Tianjin, China

Hebeitun Town 河北屯镇
- Town
- Location within Tianjin Location within China
- Coordinates: 39°34′42″N 117°07′19″E
- Country: China
- Municipality: Tianjin
- District: Wuqing
- Village-level Divisions: 31 villages

Area
  - Total: 46.28 km^{2} (17.87 sq mi)
- Elevation: 8 m (26 ft)

Population (2010)
  - Total: 30,418
  - Density: 657.3/km^{2} (1,702/sq mi)
- Time zone: UTC+8 (CST)
- Postal code: 301704
- Area code: 022

Hebeitun Town (simplified Chinese: 河北屯镇; traditional Chinese: 河北屯鎮; pinyin: Héběitún Zhèn) is a town on the northern part of Wuqing District, Tianjin, China. It shares border with Liusong Town to its north, Dakoutun Town to its east, Cuihuangkou and Daliang Towns to its south, and Xiawuqi Town to its west. The town is home to 30,418 inhabitants as of 2010.

It was named Hebeitun (Chinese: 河北屯; lit. 'River North Hamlet') during the Yuan Dynasty because of its location north of a local channel.

== Geography ==
Hebeitun Town is situated at the southwest of Qinglongwan River. The average elevation in Hebeitun is 8 meters above the sea level.

== History ==
Timetable of Hebeitun Town
Year	Status	Within
1949 - 1961	Part of 11th District	Xianghe County, Hebei
1961 - 1973	Hebeitun People's Commune	Wuqing County, Hebei
1973 - 1983	Hebeitun People's Commune	Wuqing County, Tianjin
1983 - 1999	Hebeitun Township	Wuqing County, Tianjin
1999 - 2000	Hebeitun Town	Wuqing County, Tianjin
2000 - present	Hebeitun Town	Wuqing District, Tianjin

== Administrative divisions ==
As of the year 2022, Hebeitun Town consisted of the following 31 villages:

- Hebeitun (河北屯)
- Shibaozhuang (石薄庄)
- Fengzhuang (冯庄)
- Xiaoganzhuang (肖赶庄)
- Sanlitun (三里屯)
- Xiaohuangzhuang (小黄庄)
- Bei Ligezhuang (北李各庄)
- Jiuchiyuan (九池元)
- Xiaoyangzhuang (小杨庄)
- Kangxinzhuang (康辛庄)
- Wudongshang (武洞上)
- Xidongshang (西洞上)
- Houdongshang (后洞上)
- Bei Lixinzhuang (北李辛庄)
- Wangmajie (王马街)
- Liujiajie (刘家街)
- Yangjiajie (杨家街)
- Nankoushao (南口哨)
- Beikoushao (北口哨)
- Tayuan (塔元)
- Dongsuzhuang (东苏庄)
- Donglou (东楼)
- Xilou (西楼)
- Zhenmazhuang (甄马庄)
- Qianhangkou (前韩口)
- Tonggaocun (桐高村)
- Kangjiazhuang (亢家庄)
- Aijiazhuang (艾家庄)
- Bei Zhangxinzhuang (北张辛庄)
- Lidaren (李大人)
- Yangjiachang (杨家场)

== See also ==
- List of township-level divisions of Tianjin
