= Damengzhuang =

Town in Tianjin, China

Damengzhuang Town 大孟庄镇
- Town
- Location within Tianjin Location within China
- Coordinates: 39°31′15″N 116°59′10″E
- Country: China
- Municipality: Tianjin
- District: Wuqing
- Village-level Divisions: 21 villages

Area
  - Total: 45.20 km^{2} (17.45 sq mi)
- Elevation: 9 m (30 ft)

Population (2010)
  - Total: 22,162
  - Density: 490.3/km^{2} (1,270/sq mi)
- Time zone: UTC+8 (CST)
- Postal code: 301711
- Area code: 022

Damengzhuang Town (simplified Chinese: 大孟庄镇; traditional Chinese: 大孟莊鎮; pinyin: Dàmèngzhuāng Zhèn) is a town located inside of Wuqing District, Tianjin, China. It borders Hexiwu Town in its north, Daliang Town in its east, Nancaicun Town in its south, as well as Sicundian and Baigutun Towns in its west. It had a population of 22,162 as of 2010.

The name Damengzhuang (Chinese: 大孟庄镇; lit. 'Great Meng's Villa') refers to the village where the government of the town is located in. The village in turn gets its name from the Meng family that first settled here in the beginning of Ming Dynasty.

== History ==
History of Damengzhuang Town
Years	Status	Belong to
1959 - 1973	Damengzhuang People's Commune	Wuqing County, Hebei
1973 - 1985	Damengzhuang People's Commune	Wuqing County, Tianjin
1985 - 1996	Damengzhuang Township	Wuqing County, Tianjin
1996 - 2000	Damengzhuang Town	Wuqing County, Tianjin
2000 - present	Damengzhuang Town	Wuqing District, Tianjin

== Administrative divisions ==
By 2022, Damengzhuang Town oversaw 21 villages. They are listed below:

- Huotun (霍屯)
- Damengzhuang (大孟庄)
- Sigezhuang (寺各庄)
- Xiaowangzhuang (小王庄)
- Dawangzhuang (大王庄)
- Mengcundian (蒙村店)
- Qixianggongzhuang (七相公庄)
- Zhaoyangsi (昭阳寺)
- Dadao Zhangzhuang (大道张庄)
- Anzishang (安子上)
- Sanjianfang (三间房)
- Xiaoyahuzhai (小押虎寨)
- Dayahuzhai (大押虎寨)
- Tingshang (亭上)
- Liuzhuang (刘庄)
- Zhanggangzhuang (张岗庄)
- Houyouzhuang (后幼庄)
- Qianyouzhuang (前幼庄)
- Xiaomengzhuang (小孟庄)
- Yangdian (杨店)
- Dachengzhuang (大程庄)

== See also ==
- List of township-level divisions of Tianjin
