= Xiazhuzhuang Subdistrict =

Subdistrict of Tianjin, China

Xiazhuzhuang Subdistrict 下朱庄街道
- Subdistrict
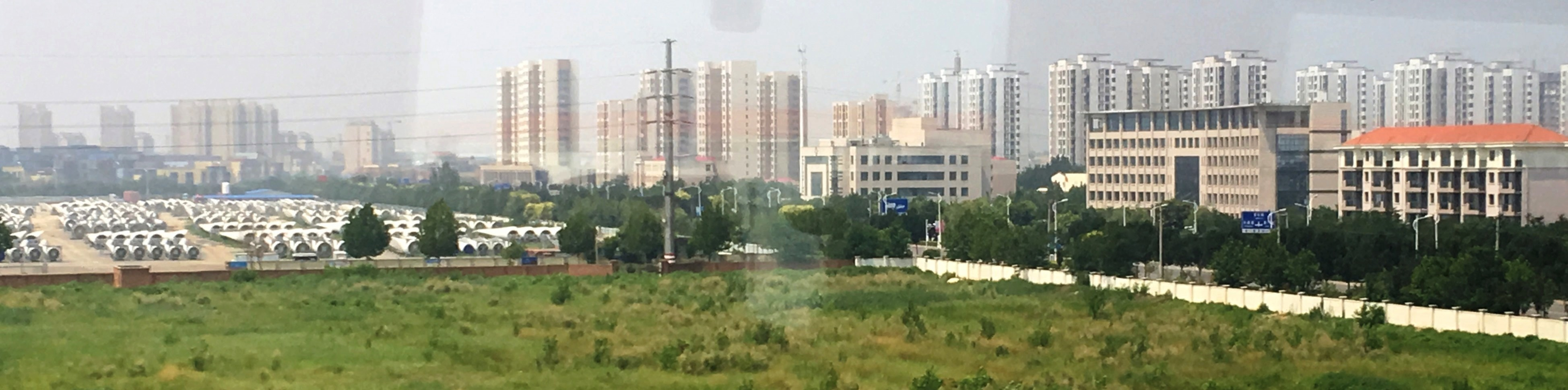
- Jinghu Huayuan Residential Community in Xiazhuzhuang

- Location within Tianjin Location within China
- Coordinates: 39°20′16″N 117°04′39″E
- Country: China
- Municipality: Tianjin
- District: Wuqing
- Village-level Divisions: 16 communities

Area
  - Total: 35.38 km^{2} (13.66 sq mi)
- Elevation: 6 m (20 ft)

Population (2010)
  - Total: 24,295
  - Density: 686.7/km^{2} (1,779/sq mi)
- Time zone: UTC+8 (CST)
- Postal code: 301725
- Area code: 022

Xiazhuzhuang Subdistrict (simplified Chinese: 下朱庄街道; traditional Chinese: 下朱莊街道; pinyin: Xiàzhūzhuāng Jiēdào) is a subdistrict in the south side of Wuqing District, Tianjin, China. It shares border with Yangcun Subdistrict to its north, Meichang Town to its east, Dazhangzhuang and Shuangjie Towns in its south, and Huangzhuang Subdistrict in its west. As of 2010, it has a census population of 24,295.

The region was initially named Xiazhuzhuang (Chinese: 夏朱庄; lit. 'Xia and Zhu's Villa') for the two prominent families of the settlement during the Ming dynasty. Later when the Xia family moved out, the name was changed to Xiazhuzhuang (Chinese: 下朱庄) to distinguish from the Shangzhuzhuang Village to the north.

== Geography ==
Xiazhuzhuang Subdistrict is located on the eastern bank of the Grand Canal. The National Highway 103 passes through its western portion. The Yuzhuang Reservoir is situated on its eastern side. The average elevation of the subdistrict is 6 meters above the sea level.

== History ==
In 1986, this region was organized into Xiazhuzhuang Township. The township was upgraded into a subdistrict in the year 2001.

== Administrative divisions ==
By the end of 2022, the following 16 residential communities constituted Xiazhuzhuang Subdistrict:

- Jinghu Huayuan (静湖花园)
- Xiuyue Yuan (越秀园)
- Longwan Cheng (龙湾城)
- Bixi Yuan Diyi Shequ
  (碧溪园第一社区)
- Bixi Yuan Di'er Shequ
  (碧溪园第二社区)
- Huajun (花郡)
- Jianing Dao Nan (嘉宁道南)
- Jianing Dao Bei (嘉宁道北)
- Xinyue Dao (辛越道)
- Xinxiu Dao (辛秀道)
- Wenhui Lu (文汇路)
- Nanhu (南湖)
- Leren Dao (乐仁道)
- Qijia Dao (齐家道)
- Fengshun Lu (丰顺路)
- Fenghe Lu (丰和路)

== See also ==
- List of township-level divisions of Tianjin
