= G103 =

G103 may refer to any of the following:

- China National Highway 103, a major trunk route in China
- Grob G103a Twin II, a two-seater sailplane made by Grob Aerospace
- R-1820-G103, a model of the Wright R-1820 aircraft engine
