= History of the Port of Tianjin =

Port of Tianjin 天津港
- Interactive map of Port of Tianjin 天津港

Location
- Country: China
- Location: Tianjin
- Coordinates: 38°58′33″N 117°47′15″E

Details
- Opened: 1860 (Port of Tanggu); 1952-10-17 (Tianjin Xingang reopening)
- Operated by: Tianjin Port Group Ltd
- Owned by: Tianjin State-owned Assets Supervision and Administration Commission
- Type of Harbor: Deep-water Seaport/Riverport
- Land area: 121 km^{2}
- Size: 260 km^{2} (470 km^{2} total jurisdictional area)
- No. of berths: 217; Production Berths: 140 (2010)
- Employees: 20,000 (2008)
- Chairman: Yu Rumin
- UN/LOCODE: CNTXG or CNTSN (formerly CNTJP/CNTGU)
- World Port Index Number: 60190
- Nautical Charts: 94363/0 (NGA/NIMA); 2653/4 (Admiralty); 11773/4(Chinese)

Statistics
- Annual cargo tonnage: 453 million tonnes (2011)
- Annual container volume: 11.5 million TEU (2011)
- Value of cargo: 197.249 billion USD (2011)
- Passenger traffic: 110,000 cruiser passengers (2012)
- Annual revenue: 21.5 billion RMB (2011)
- Net income: 1.678 billion RMB (2011)
- Website http://www.ptacn.com

The Port of Tianjin (Tianjin Gang, Chinese: 天津港; pinyin: tiānjīn gǎng), formerly known as the Port of Tanggu, is the largest port in Northern China and the main maritime gateway to Beijing. The name "Tianjin Xingang"(Chinese: 天津新港; pinyin: tiānjīn xīngǎng; lit. 'Tianjin New Port'), which strictly speaking refers only to the main seaport area, is sometimes used to refer to the whole port. The Port is located on the western shore of the Bohai Bay, centered on the estuary of the Haihe River, 170 km south east of Beijing and 60 km east of Tianjin city. It is the largest man-made port in mainland China, and one of the largest in the world. It covers 121 square kilometers of land surface, with over 31.9 km of quay shoreline and 151 production berths at the end of 2010.

== Haihe river ports ==
The lower course and estuary of the Haihe is the main stem of a large navigable basin, as well as the westernmost seashore of the North China Plain, making it an obvious location for a major navigational hub. The history of the Haihe ports follows this dual nature of being a hub of both inland and marine waterways, with routes changing according to political and natural changes.

First records of port activity in the Haihe date from the late Eastern Han dynasty, when Cao Cao built two canals connecting the Haihe to support his campaigns against the Wuhuan. It was, however, only after the completion of the first Grand Canal by Emperor Yang of the Sui dynasty that the lower Haihe gained importance as a logistics hub, transporting southern grain to the army outposts of northeast China. The same military necessity caused the Tang to establish the Sanhui Harbor (Chinese: 三会港口; pinyin: sānhuìgǎngkǒu; lit. 'Triple Confluence Harbor') as both a fluvial hub and a seaport at the confluence of the Yongji Canal (永濟渠), the Hutuo River (滹沱河) and the Luhe River (潞河), on modern day Junliangcheng (Chinese: 军粮成; pinyin: jūnliángchéng; lit. 'army rations town'), a fact still preserved in the town's name. Sanhui Harbor served as a forward logistics base for the Tang's campaigns against the Khitans and Goguryeo, with coastal ships and canal barges transporting 500,000 dan of grain each year.

In 960, the Haihe became the border between the Song dynasty and the Liao dynasty. The Haihe port became divided: the Song port was Nigu Harbor (泥沽海口) to the south of the Haihe, and the Liao port was at Junliangcheng, to the north. In 1043, the Yellow River had one of its frequent cataclysmic course changes, and until 1194 it took over the course of the Haihe. In that 150 years span, the enormous runoff of silt from the "Flowing Mud" caused a major change in the coastline: from its original position at Junliangcheng, the shoreline moved forward around 23 km to the present day line of Tanggu, Beitang and Gaoshaling. This led to the decline of Junliangcheng, and a new main port was established further upriver at Zhigu (直沽, now Tianjin city).

In 1153, the Jin dynasty moved its capital to Zhongdu (now Beijing). The massive needs of the capital city made Zhigu a critical grain hub, moving up to 1.7 million dan of grain per year. The Mongol conquest made this trade even more necessary when, in 1264, the Yuan dynasty established its capital at Dadu, also on the site of modern Beijing.

Feeding the enormous needs of Dadu was the spur for the creation of regular seagoing routes to complement the inland waterways, which (despite much expansion) were reaching their limit capacity. Sea routes connecting Liujiagang in Zhejiang province and Zhigu's Yangcun (杨村) wharf were established in 1276 (the Tang coast-hugging route, taking 120 days to complete), and in 1282 (a route taking 30 days to complete). A breakthrough occurred in 1293, when a third sea route was opened that took a more direct open-sea path from Liujiagang to Yangcun, going eastwards from the Yangtze mouth into the “Black Water Ocean” (the deepest section of the Yellow Sea), turning at the tip of the Shandong peninsula around Chengshan Cape, entering the Bohai Sea through the Miaodao Strait, and then going directly from Laizhou into the Haihe mouth. This route required more complex navigation, but it took less than ten days to sail, and it is in essence the route still used today for shipping between Shanghai and Tianjin. To assist this burgeoning sea trade, in 1318 the first recorded aid to navigation in the region was established in the Longwangmiao temple at the Haihe mouth. During daytime, white cloth flags were raised on high poles. At night, lamps were lit and raised to guide approaching boats.

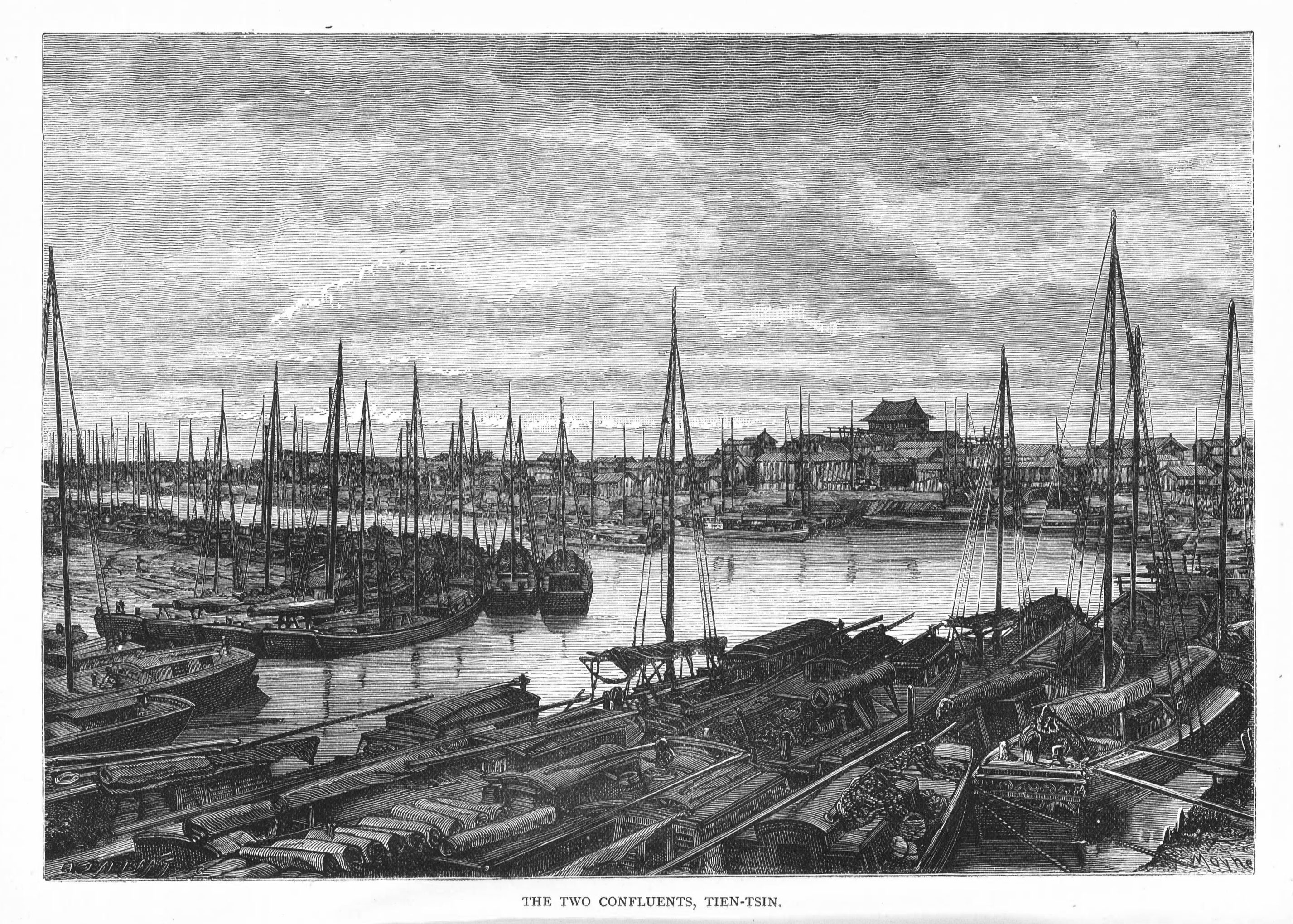
Tianjin river port at the confluence with the Grand Canal

Activity diminished with fall of the Yuan and the move of the capital to Nanjing. The port of Zhigu was renamed "Tianjin" ("Ford of the Emperor") in 1400 by the Yongle Emperor, to commemorate a victorious forced river crossing. Yongle's move of the imperial capital back to Beijing in 1405 renewed Tianjin's importance as a grain hub. Soon, the port was moving 4 million dan of grain per year, a number that remained fairly consistent during Ming and Qing times.

The Ming and later the Qing were sporadically hostile to sea trade, which resulted in the policy of "Sea Ban" applying on and off for centuries. This policy varied from reinforcing defenses against pirates up to fully depopulating the coastline. Therefore, the focus of trade between river and sea routes oscillated wildly during the period.

== Development of the Haihe Estuary Port ==
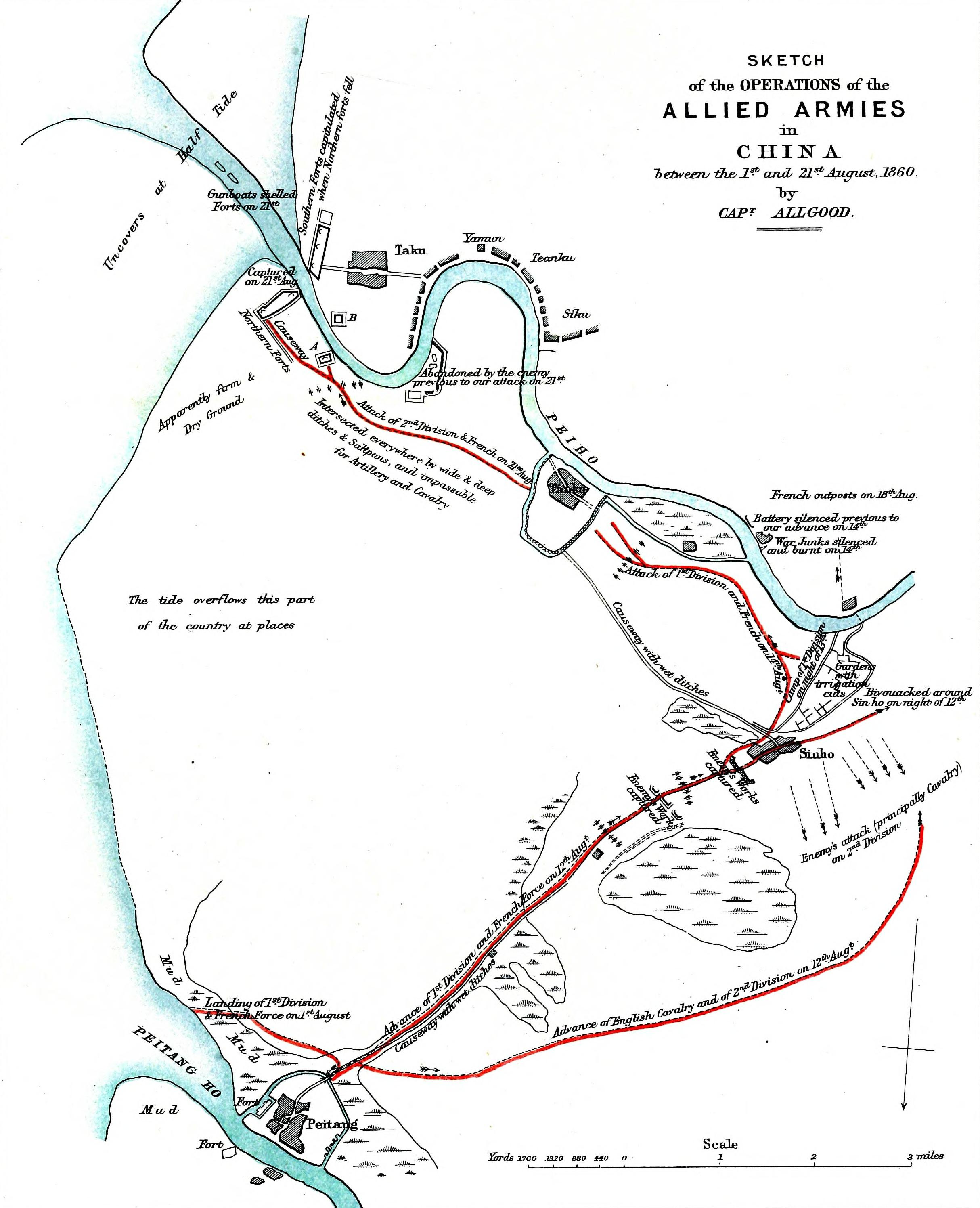
Contemporary map of the third battle of the Taku Forts, showing the layout of the Haihe mouth in 1860. Note that north is to the bottom of the image.

With the increasing presence of Western powers in East Asia, the importance of maritime access to Beijing grew. In 1816, the Taku Forts were rebuilt to protect the access to the Haihe estuary at the Dagu area. The Forts became a critical battleground during the Second Opium War. In the aftermath of the war, the 1860 Treaty of Tianjin opened up Tianjin to foreign trade and established the first Foreign Concessions in Tianjin. While the main trade port was located upriver in the Concessions at Zichulin (紫竹林), right next to Tianjin city, Dagu and Tanggu became critical transhipment points due to the Taku Bar (大沽坝), (Note: The name "Taku Bar" became a common (if strictly inaccurate) way to refer to the entire Tanggu river port, and older or outdated references still identify it as a distinct port.) the two-miles wide sandbar at the Haihe mouth, which had a high tide depth of less than 3 m. This meant that most seagoing ships needed to anchor in the Bohai Bay and lighter their cargo onto shallow barges. For this purpose, the Sino-British "Taku Tug & Lighterage Company" (大沽驳船公司) was founded in 1864, and the first modern wharf at Tanggu was opened (the "Tongku Little Wharf" at Lanjingdao, nowadays the Huanhai Shipyard). Soon other transshipment facilities followed, in particular those run by Butterfield & Swire and Jardine Matheson. Tanggu also remained a critical strategic point for the Qing government, and Li Hongzhang established the Taku Naval Dockyard there, and fostered the extension of the Kaiping Tramway to Dagu —later the Jingtang (Beijing-Tanggu) railway.

The Boxer Rebellion once more saw a critical battle fought for the Taku Forts. After the capture of Beijing by the Eight Nation Alliance, the Qing Court was forced to sign the Boxer Protocol, which further increased the size of the Concessions (now including nine countries), and granted the foreign occupation of Tanggu. This led to significant development of the Tanggu port by all the various foreign powers. Wharves by British, German, Japanese and American companies were built (mostly on the northern shore of the Haihe), and by 1940, Tanggu had 56 berths amounting to 6,090 m of quayside

== Establishment of Tanggu Xingang ==
The history of the Tanggu Xingang seaport (later the Tianjin Xingang port) started during the Japanese occupation of China. In 1938, the Japanese occupation forces decided that the existing river ports in Tianjin and Tanggu were insufficient to meet their needs for transportation to and from North China. The Haihe was troublesome both due to silting and winter icing, and the Taku Bar allowed passage only to very shallow vessels, so the decision was made to expand capacity by building a seaport outside of the Haihe estuary. After an exploratory and planning period, construction work started on 25 October 1940. In October 1941, the Tanggu New Port Harbor Bureau was set up.

The original Japanese plan called for laying down a 30 km breakwater; dredging a 13.4 km, 200 m wide shipping channel; building a shiplock at the entrance of the Haihe; and establishing three wharves with 12 berths, for a projected throughput of 27 Mt. The plan was expected to be completed by 1947. Work slowed down as the war started to go wrong for Japan, and resources (in particular, coal) became more and more scarce. By the time of Japan's surrender in 1945, the project was less than half-way completed: the shipping channel had been two-thirds dredged, breakwaters extended 11 km, only one terminal with 700 m of quayside had been completed, and a second terminal and the barge terminal were almost completed. The Shiplock was 85% complete, 11 km of railways had been laid down, and the ship dock (now the Xingang Shipyard) had been established.

The First Marine Division landed at Tanggu on 30 September 1945 and accepted the Japanese surrender of Tianjin on 6 October 1945, before transferring control back to the Nationalist government. The Kuomintang authorities restarted the incomplete works, and reopened the port. But as the Chinese Civil War raged, resources dried up and disorder in the running of the port grew. Lack of resources, combat damage, and finally demolitions by the retreating Nationalist forces left the Tanggu New Port damaged and silted into unusability.

The Communists captured Tanggu on 17 September 1949, but restoring the port online was a slow process. On 15 September 1950, the Tianjin Port Bureau of the Department of Transportation was officially established to provide the first unified management of the ports in the Tianjin region. On 24 August 1951, the ports at Tanggu were reorganized again into the "Tanggu New Port" (塘沽新港), and work started on re-dredging the navigation channel and rehabilitating four sea piers. On 17 October 1952, the Port reopened for traffic. At the time, the main channel was dredged to 6 m depth, could handle ships of up to 7,000 DWT and had an annual throughput of only 800,000 tonnes -less than 1/500 of present capacity.

In the next decades, port expansion was slow. By 1956, throughput had reached 10 million tons, and it remained roughly at that level for the next two decades. Even then, however, Tanggu Xingang was a pioneer of port development in the People's Republic of China: in September 1973, Tianjin Port successfully opened up the first international container ship route in China. A slow period of expansion continued, with the characteristic four piers of Beijiang being built in the late 1970s. In 1980, Tianjin Port established the first dedicated container terminal in China.

== Reform and opening ==
The export boom that followed the post-1978 reform and opening up period put enormous pressure on the rickety port infrastructure of China. Congestion became serious enough to force reform by the central government: on 1 June 1984, the Port of Tianjin was transferred from direct control of the Ministry of Communications to a "dual" system of shared central and local control.

This devolution entailed transferring line operations, human resources and financial responsibility to the municipal government of Tianjin, while the ministry of transport retained strategic planning and coordination duties. On 19 July 1984, the Tianjin Port Bureau of the Department of Transportation was renamed the Port of Tianjin Authority (天津港务局, PTA). Critically, this new port authority was given a degree of relative financial autonomy (a policy called "以收抵支、以港养港” pinyin: yǐ shōu dǐ zhī, yǐ gǎng yǎng gǎng; lit. 'with income above expenditures', 'the port nurtures the port'), in essence allowing the port to finance expansion from retained earnings.

Despite this partial liberalization, growth was very slow in the early 80's. The port was bedeviled by both land and capital shortages, until it became a relatively early recipient of World Bank infrastructure development loans, which financed the modernization and expansion of several wharves. With progressive commercial success and increasing access to capital, the Port started to expand fast in both size and capacity.

Annual Throughput of the Port of Tianjin 1990-2011

Production then increased in leaps and bounds. In 1988 throughput passed the 20 million tonnes milestone, and in the ten years from 1993, annual throughput growth averaged 10 million tonnes every year. In December 2001, the Port was the first port in North China to reach the 100 million tonnes mark, in 2004 it reached 200 million tonnes, in 2007 300 million tonnes and in 2010 400 million tonnes. The container handling capacity of the port increased from 0.4 million TEU in 1992, to 2.4 million TEU in 2002, 7.1 million TEU in 2007, and more than 10 million TEU in 2010.

The structure of the Port also changed. In 1992, Tianjin Port Storage and Transportation Company was made into a joint stock company under the full ownership of the Tianjin Port Bureau. In 1996, it was converted into the Tianjin Port Holdings Company (TPC) and listed in the Shanghai stock market. In 1997, Tianjin Development Holdings, which owned the container-handling assets of the Port, was listed in Hong Kong. Its port assets were later spun out as the Tianjin Port Development Company (TPD) and listed in the Hong Kong exchange in 2006.

In 2001, as part of the widespread reform of all of China's SOEs, the State Council passed guidelines requiring the separation of state administration and operation in all ports, by transforming the various Port Authorities into corporations. In 2003, the Port Law was passed to regulate China's ports operation as fully commercial enterprises. The law permitted for the first time foreign ownership of port operators.

The PTA delayed corporatization to steer the passing of the 11th five year development plan for the port. The transition was only completed on 3 June 2004, when the PTA became the last major Port Authority in China to become a corporation: the Tianjin Port (Group) Company (天津港(集团)有限公司, or TPG by its English acronym).

The financial tsunami of 2008 hit Chinese ports particularly hard, as they depended heavily on foreign trade flows. The Tianjin Port did better than average due to its diversification: while container business plummeted, bulk trade (in particular iron ore) remained strong. Nevertheless, the crisis hit profits hard, and it convinced the Tianjin government to reorganize and streamline the structure of the Port, which they did in 2009 by having TPD (the smaller operator, but one with the useful foreign registration and access to foreign capital markets) take over TPC. Simultaneously, ownership of TPD was transferred from Tianjin Development Holdings (a subsidiary of the Tianjin Ministry of Commerce) to TPG. By the time the merger was concluded, on 4 February 2010, all operations in the Tianjin Port had been consolidated under TPG.

=== 2015 explosions ===
The Port of Tianjin was adversely affected by a large industrial-scale accident in August 2015. On August 12, a series of explosions took place at a port chemical storage facility in Binhai, causing 173 deaths and nearly 800 injuries. The blast had the equivalent of 21 metric tons of TNT or a magnitude-2.9 earthquake, according to the China Earthquake Networks Center. Eight other people remain missing. Eight additional explosions occurred on 15 August 2015.
