= Hexiwu =

Town in Tianjin, China

Hexiwu Town 河西务镇
- Town
- Cihang Chanlin Temple within Xiaoli Village, Hexiwu Town

- Location within Tianjin Location within China
- Coordinates: 39°37′21″N 116°57′14″E
- Country: China
- Municipality: Tianjin
- District: Wuqing
- Village-level Divisions: 2 communities 51 villages

Area
  - Total: 70.11 km^{2} (27.07 sq mi)
- Elevation: 12 m (39 ft)

Population (2010)
  - Total: 45,814
  - Density: 653.5/km^{2} (1,692/sq mi)
- Time zone: UTC+8 (CST)
- Postal code: 301711
- Area code: 022

Hexiwu Town (simplified Chinese: 河西务镇; traditional Chinese: 河西務鎮; pinyin: Héxīwù Zhèn), formerly known as Ho-Hsi-Wu, is a town situated on the northern part of Wuqing District, Tianjin, China. It borders Yongledian and Anping Towns to the north, Qiantun Township and Xiawuqi Town to the east, Damengzhuang and Daliang Towns to the south, as well as Baigutun and Gaocun Towns to the west. In the year 2010, the town was home to 45,814 residents.

This town got the name Hexiwu (Chinese: 河西务; lit. 'River West Affair') for its location on the west of the Grand Canal and hosting local taxation agency during the Yuan Dynasty.

== Geography ==
Hexiwu Town is located along the Grand Canal. It has an average elevation of 12 meters above the sea level.

== History ==
During the Ming dynasty, the bursting of several dikes at Hexiwu touched off a crisis in 1424. Mu Jin and Zhang Xin directed efforts by more than 5,000 workers from the Ministry of Public Works to repair the damage and restore the irrigation system.

The site played a minor role during the Boxer Rebellion, seeing battle on 25 July between the international relief force and the Kansu Braves under Dong Fuxiang.

== Administrative divisions ==
At the end of 2022, Hexiwu Town covered 53 subdivisions, where 2 were residential communities and 51 were villages. They are listed below:

=== Residential Communities ===
- Taiyangcheng (太阳城)
- Dongxingli (东兴里)

=== Villages ===
- Wuqi (五七)
- Sanjie (三街)
- Sijie (四街)
- Zhouyangzhuang (周羊庄)
- Tucheng (土城)
- Dalongzhuang (大龙庄)
- Zhengzhuang (郑庄)
- Xiaolongzhuang (小龙庄)
- Bei Sanlitun (北三里屯)
- Shangliuzhuang (上刘庄)
- Naimuzhuang (奶母庄)
- Qianbaimiao (前白庙)
- Zhongbaimiao (中白庙)
- Dongbaimiao (东白庙)
- Suozhuang (索庄)
- Gaozhuang (高庄)
- Baizhuang (白庄)
- Tangzhuang (唐庄)
- Yuezhuang (岳庄)
- Futou Houjie (扶头后街)
- Futou Qianjie (扶头前街)
- Sijianfang (四间房)
- Shiqiao Xinzhuang (石桥辛庄)
- Dongxi Chenzhuang (东西陈庄)
- Xiaozhuang (肖庄)
- Baoshizhuang (宝石庄)
- Liufeng (刘坟)
- Baolou (包楼)
- Xiaoli (孝力)
- Hangzhuang (韩庄)
- Longzhuang (龚庄)
- Nancang (南仓)
- Cuilou (崔楼)
- Heyizhuang (合义庄)
- Bei Daxinzhuang (北大辛庄)
- Shangxinzhuang (上辛庄)
- Yangfang (羊坊)
- Dongxicang (东西仓)
- Matou (马头)
- Muchang (木厂)
- Xiaoshahe (小沙河)
- Zhuangwo (庄窝)
- Huangtun (黄屯)
- Beilizhuang (北里庄)
- Qinying (秦营)
- Shuiniu (水牛)
- Luzhuang (路庄)
- Dayoufa (大友垡)
- Maoyao (毛窑)
- Wawu (瓦屋)
- Dashahe (大沙河)

== See also ==
- List of township-level divisions of Tianjin
