= Tianjin No.47 High School =

High school in Tianjin, China

Coordinates: 39°13′17″N 117°07′57″E

Tianjin No.47 High School Chinese: 天津市第四十七中学

Information
- Established: 1954; 71 years ago

Tianjin No. 47 High School (Chinese: 天津市第四十七中学; pinyin: Tiānjīn Shì Dì Sìshíqī Zhōngxué) is located on China National Highway 103 in Beichen District, Tianjin, China.

== History ==
Sometime in the early 1950s, Yang Yupu (Chinese: 杨玉璞) proposed that a senior high school be built in the Beichen District. Yang Yupu was the father of Yang Liandi (杨连弟) and the Municipal People's Representative of Tianjin. The school was established in 1954 as the first suburban Middle School and was financially supported by the government. In 1978, it was confirmed as one of the 19 top senior High Schools in Tianjin.

The school was split into two in 1997, becoming Huachen Middle School and Tianjin No. 47 High School. In 2002, the High School section relocated, and it became a demonstration school. In 2012, Peking University ranked it as one of the best senior High Schools in China.
