= Xiawuqi =

Town in Tianjin, China

Xiawuqi Town 下伍旗镇
- Town
- Location within Tianjin Location within China
- Coordinates: 39°36′56″N 117°03′19″E
- Country: China
- Municipality: Tianjin
- District: Wuqing
- Village-level Divisions: 34 villages

Area
  - Total: 49.20 km^{2} (19.00 sq mi)
- Elevation: 10 m (33 ft)

Population (2010)
  - Total: 23,889
  - Density: 485.5/km^{2} (1,258/sq mi)
- Time zone: UTC+8 (CST)
- Postal code: 301705
- Area code: 022

Xiawuqi Town (simplified Chinese: 下伍旗镇; traditional Chinese: 下伍旗鎮; pinyin: Xiàwǔqí Zhèn) is a town situated within Wuqing District, Tianjin, China. It shares border with Wubaihu and Liusong Towns in the north, Hebeitun Town in the east, Daliang Town in the south, and Hexiwu Town in the west. Its population was 23,889 as of 2010.

The town's name Xiawuqi (Chinese: 下伍旗; lit. 'Lower Five Banner') came from its location as the station ground for some of the Banner troops during the early days of Qing Dynasty.

== Geography ==
Xiawuqi Town is situated on the eastern bank of Grand Canal and the southern bank of Qinglongwan River. Its average elevation is 10 meters above the sea level.

== History ==
History of Xiawuqi Town
Years	Status	Under
1958 - 1973	Xiawuqi People's Commune	Wuqing County, Hebei
1973 - 1983	Xiawuqi People's Commune	Wuqing County, Tianjin
1983 - 1997	Xiawuqi Township	Wuqing County, Tianjin
1997 - 2000	Xiawuqi Town	Wuqing County, Tianjin
2000 - present	Xiawuqi Town	Wuqing District, Tianjin

== Administrative divisions ==
As of 2022, Xiawuqi Town administers the following 34 villages:

- Xiawuqi (下伍旗)
- Zhongyi (忠义)
- Liangguantun (良官屯)
- Chaizhuang (柴庄)
- Beichenzhuang (北陈庄)
- Shaozhuang (邵庄)
- Beibabaihu (北八百户)
- Dingzhuang (丁庄)
- Shenjimafang (神机马坊)
- Dongwangzhuang (东王庄)
- Lihuzhuang (李胡庄)
- Beiqizhuang (北齐庄)
- Hegezhuang (河各庄)
- Qianduan (前段)
- Beizhuzhuang (北朱庄)
- Daxingzhuang (大兴庄)
- Liangzhuang (良庄)
- Beibaizhuang (北白庄)
- Beitaipingzhuang (北太平庄)
- Beibajianfang (北八间房)
- Lianhuachi (莲花池)
- Beiyanzhuang (北闫庄)
- Beichuzhuang (北褚庄)
- Xiwangzhuang (西王庄)
- Xinzhuangzi (辛庄子)
- Houduan (后段)
- Liupizhuang (刘皮庄)
- Hongsi (红寺)
- Mengxinzhuang (孟辛庄)
- Sanbaihu (三百户)
- Xiaojinzhuang (小金庄)
- Gaoxinzhuang (高辛庄)
- Mashenmiao (马神庙)
- Beitian Xinzhuang (北田辛庄)

== See also ==
- List of township-level divisions of Tianjin
