= Dajianchang =

Town in Tianjin, China

Dajianchang Town 大碱厂镇
- Town
- Location within Tianjin Location within China
- Coordinates: 39°28′38″N 117°05′03″E
- Country: China
- Municipality: Tianjin
- District: Wuqing
- Village-level Divisions: 1 community 26 villages

Area
  - Total: 37.79 km^{2} (14.59 sq mi)
- Elevation: 7 m (23 ft)

Population (2010)
  - Total: 22,323
  - Density: 590.7/km^{2} (1,530/sq mi)
- Time zone: UTC+8 (CST)
- Postal code: 301706
- Area code: 022

Dajianchang Town (simplified Chinese: 大碱厂镇; traditional Chinese: 大鹼廠鎮; pinyin: Dàjiǎnchǎng Zhèn) is a town situated on the central part of Wuqing District, Tianjin, China. It shares border with Cuihuangkou Town in its north, Caozili Town in its east, Xuguantun Subdistrict in its south, and Nancaicun Town in its west. The 2010 Chinese Census counted 22,323 residents for this town.

The name Dajianchang literally means "Large Basic Shack".

== Geography ==
Dajianchang Town is located on the north of the Grand Canal and Beijing Paiwu River. The Jingjin Expressway and Cuiyang Line traverse through the town. Its average elevation is 7 meters above the sea level.

== History ==
Timeline of Dajianchang Town
Years	Status	Part of
1957 - 1958	Dajianchang Township	Wuqing County, Hebei
1958 - 1959	Within Kuang'ergangbei People's Commune	Wuqing County, Hebei
1959 - 1961	Within Kuang'ergang People's Commune	Wuqing County, Hebei
1961 - 1973	Dajianchang People's Commune	Wuqing County, Hebei
1973 - 1983	Dajianchang People's Commune	Wuqing County, Tianjin
1983 - 1999	Dajianchang Township	Wuqing County, Tianjin
1999 - 2000	Dajianchang Town	Wuqing County, Tianjin
2000 - present	Dajianchang Town	Wuqing District, Tianjin

== Administrative divisions ==
As of the year 2022, Dajianchang Town has 27 subdivisions, of those 1 is a residential community and 26 are villages. They are listed as follows:

=== Residential community ===
- Tengda Jiayuan (腾达家园)

=== Villages ===
- Dajianchang (大碱厂)
- Huangguantun (黄官屯)
- Gouzhaotun (勾兆屯)
- Zhongfengzhuang (中丰庄)
- Xiafengzhuang (下丰庄)
- Jianzuiwo (尖嘴窝)
- Nanxinzhuang (南辛庄)
- Kuang'ergang (筐儿港)
- Changtun (长屯)
- Lanjiazhuang (兰家庄)
- Erwanggongzhuang (二王公庄)
- Nianxinzhuang (年辛庄)
- Huxinzhuang (胡辛庄)
- Liuwuzhuang (刘五庄)
- Sunxiaotun (孙小屯)
- Lanjiaxiang (兰家巷)
- Anlou (安楼)
- Chenlou (陈楼)
- Tianhe (田河)
- Yangfengzhuang (杨凤庄)
- Xiliangwo (西粮窝)
- Liupaizhuang (刘排庄)
- Sunlinzhuang (孙林庄)
- Hongjiazhuang (洪家庄)
- Hanjiazhuang (韩家庄)
- Gangbei Xinzhuang (港北辛庄)

== See also ==
- List of township-level divisions of Tianjin
