= Gaocun, Wuqing =

Town in Wuqing District, Tianjin, China

Gaocun Town 高村镇
- Town
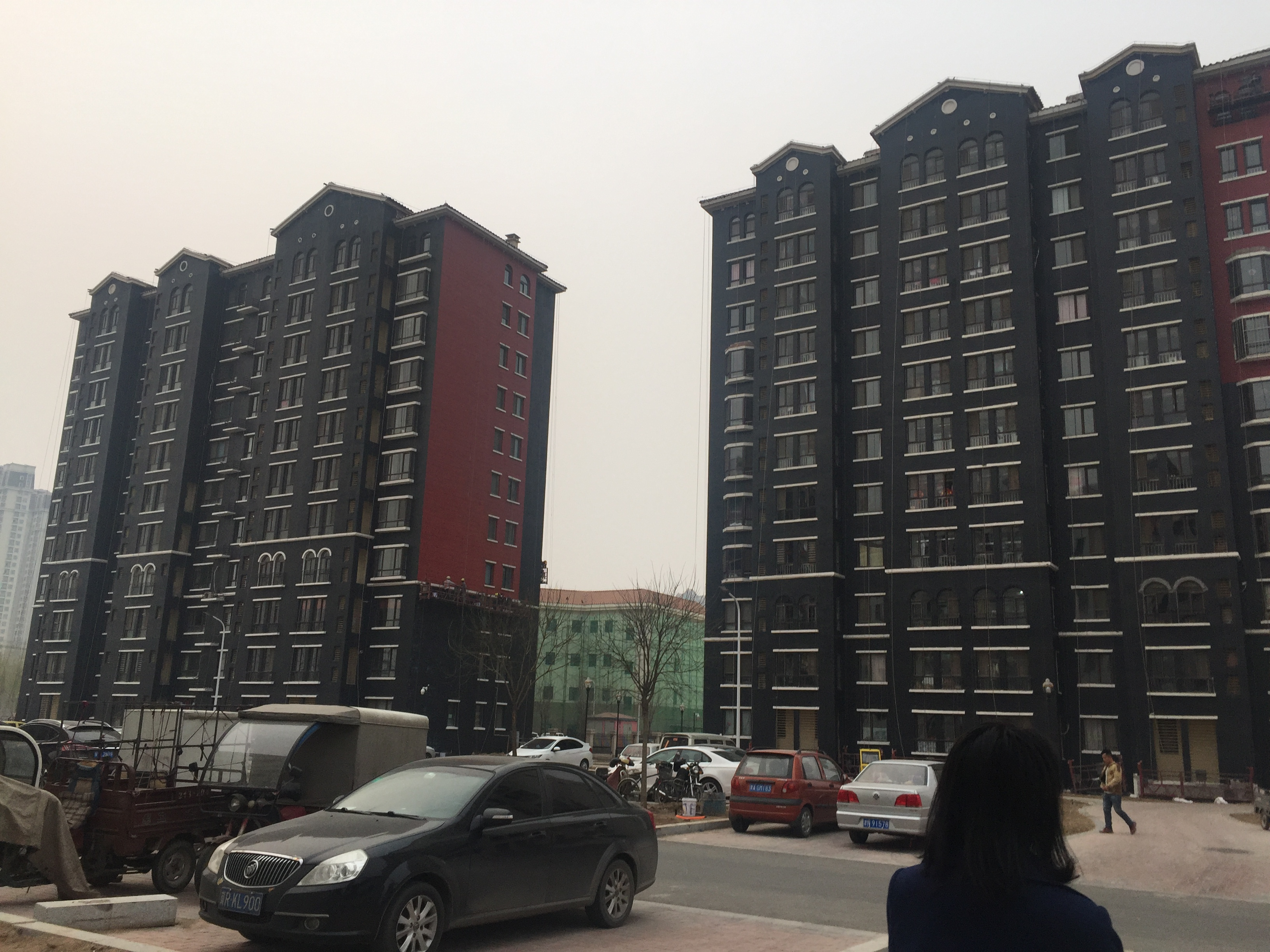
- Taitou residential compound in the northwest of the town

- Location in Tianjin Gaocun Town (China)
- Coordinates: 39°37′11″N 116°53′10″E
- Country: China
- Municipality: Tianjin
- District: Wuqing
- Village-level Divisions: 3 residential communities 11 villages

Area
  - Total: 39.89 km^{2} (15.40 sq mi)
- Elevation: 12 m (39 ft)

Population (2010)
  - Total: 18,210
  - Density: 456.5/km^{2} (1,182/sq mi)
- Time zone: UTC+8 (CST)
- Postal code: 301737
- Area code: 022

Gaocun Town (simplified Chinese: 高村镇; traditional Chinese: 高村鎮; pinyin: Gāocūn Zhèn), formerly Gaocun Township (simplified Chinese: 高村乡; traditional Chinese: 高村鄉; pinyin: Gāocūn Xiāng), is a town in Wuqing District in the northwest of Tianjin Municipality. It is located half-way between the city centres of Beijing and Tianjin at the Gaocun exit on the Jingjintang Expressway. The town had a population of 18,210 as per the 2010 census.

Gaocun was promoted from village status to township status in 2013 at around the same time when the region underwent rapid development. Beijing Capital Land has invested billions of Chinese yuan into the Gaocun area by building a Science Park, an international school called Haileybury International School, Wisdom Plaza and Jingjinhui entertainment complex. Two shopping malls are currently under construction.

== Geography ==
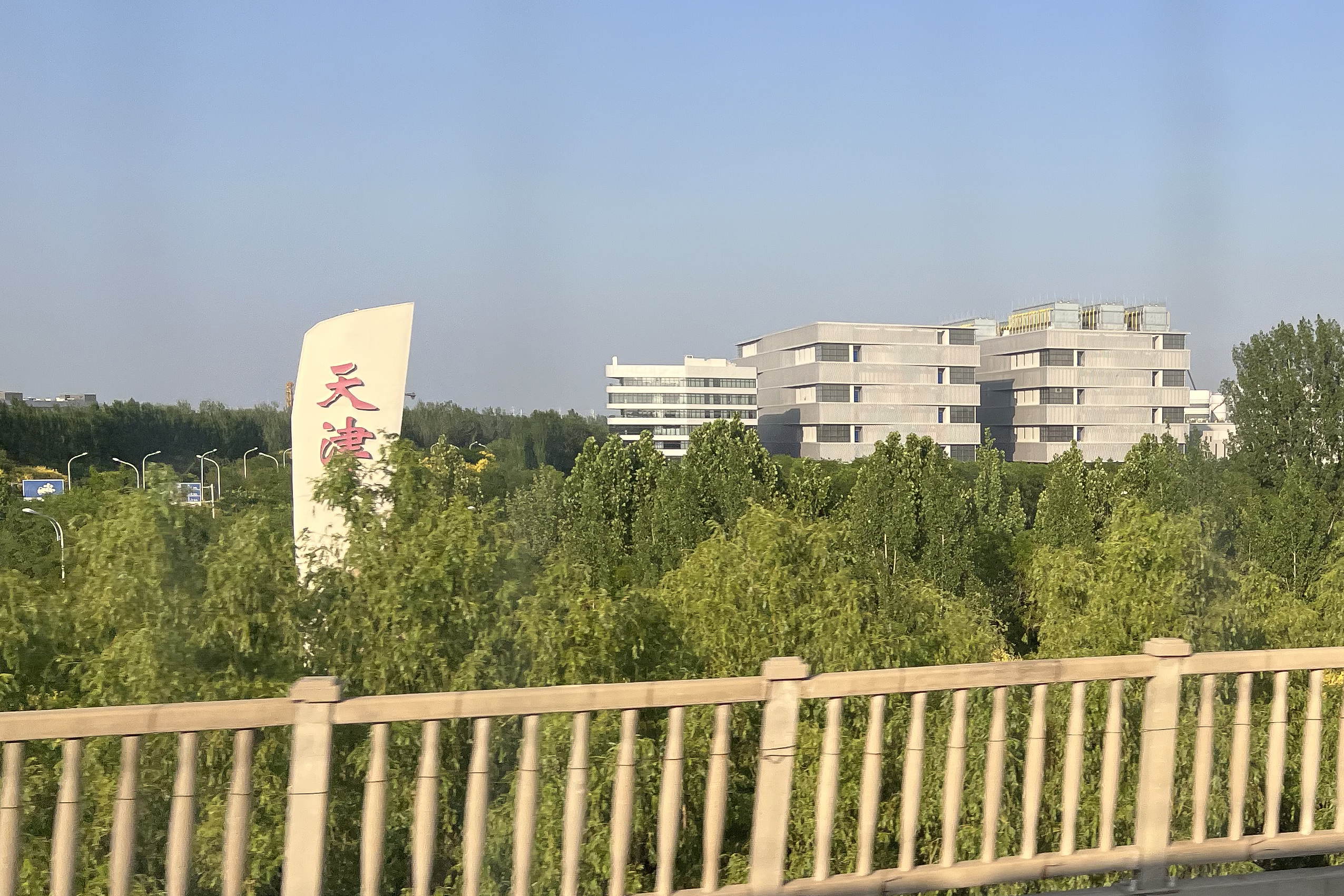
Tianjin boundary sign in Gaocun Town

Gaocun Town is bounded by Beijing Paiwu River to the east and Fenghe River to the west, with Beijing-Tianjin Expressway passing through it. It has an elevation of 12 meters above the sea level.

== Administrative divisions ==
In 2022, Gaocun town incorporated the following residential communities and villages:

=== Residential communities ===
- Niuzhen Xinyuan (牛镇新苑)
- Taitou Xinyuan (台头新苑)
- Fenggang Xinyuan (凤港馨苑)

=== Villages ===
- Gaocun (高村)
- Lancheng (兰城)
- Houhoushang (后侯尚)
- Renzhuang (任庄)
- Jianchang (碱厂)
- Yongxingzhuang (永兴庄)
- Zhonghan (中汉)
- Dazhou (大周)
- Xiaozhou (小周)
- Lilao (里老)
- Tianhu (田户)

== See also ==
- List of township-level divisions of Tianjin
