= Cuihuangkou =

Town in Tianjin, China

Cuihuangkou Town 崔黄口镇
- Town
- Location within Tianjin Location within China
- Coordinates: 39°31′56″N 117°11′30″E
- Country: China
- Municipality: Tianjin
- District: Wuqing
- Village-level Divisions: 2 communities 49 villages

Area
  - Total: 90.97 km^{2} (35.12 sq mi)
- Elevation: 6 m (20 ft)

Population (2010)
  - Total: 51,541
  - Density: 566.6/km^{2} (1,467/sq mi)
- Time zone: UTC+8 (CST)
- Postal code: 301702
- Area code: 022

Cuihuangkou Town (simplified Chinese: 崔黄口镇; traditional Chinese: 崔黃口鎮; pinyin: Cuīhuángkǒu Zhèn) is a town located on the northeastern part of Wuqing District, Tianjin, China. It borders Hebeitun and Dakoutun Towns in its north, Niujiapai and Dahuangbu Towns in its east, Caozili and Dajianchang Towns in its south, as well as Nancaicun and Daliang Towns in its west. It also has an exclave of Dahuangbu Town in its southeast. In 2010, the population of the town is 51,541.

The area was originally named Quhuangkou (Chinese: 渠荒口; lit. 'Drainage Barren Mouth'), and was corrupted to Cuihuangkou by the influx of Khitan migrants during the Liao dynasty.

== Geography ==
Cuihuangkou Town is located on the southwest of the Qinglongwan River. The National Highway 233 passes through the eastern part of the town. Its average elevation is 6 meters above the sea level.

== History ==
Timeline of Cuihuangkou Town
Years	Status	Under
1934 - 1949	Administered by 4th District	Wuqing County, Hebei
1949 - 1950	Administered by 2nd District	Wuqing County, Hebei
1950 - 1952	Administered by 13th District	Wuqing County, Hebei
1952 - 1958	Administered by 5th District	Wuqing County, Hebei
1958 - 1961	Administered by Kuang'ergangbei People's Commune	Wuqing County, Hebei
1961 - 1973	Cuihuangkou People's Commune; Houxiang People's Commune	Wuqing County, Hebei
1973 - 1983	Cuihuangkou People's Commune; Houxiang People's Commune	Wuqing County, Tianjin
1983 - 1988	Cuihuangkou Township; Houxiang Township	Wuqing County, Tianjin
1988 - 2000	Cuihuangkou Town; Houxiang Town	Wuqing County, Tianjin
2000 - 2001	Cuihuangkou Town; Houxiang Town	Wuqing District, Tianjin
2001 - present	Cuihuangkou Town	Wuqing District, Tianjin

== Administrative divisions ==
At the end of 2022, Cuihuangkou Town is formed from 51 subdivisions, including 2 residential communities and 49 villages. They are listed below:

=== Residential communities ===
- Fuxiang Jiayuan (福巷嘉苑)
- Hongfu (鸿福)

=== Villages ===
- Yijie (一街)
- Sanjie (三街)
- Beizhuangzi (白庄子)
- Sijie (四街)
- Erjie (二街)
- Qianying (前营)
- Xigaokeng (西高坑)
- Gongxiaozhuang (龚小庄)
- Xingyao (邢窑)
- Gongying (龚营)
- Donggaokeng (东高坑)
- Dacaozhuang (大曹庄)
- Beixinzhuang (北辛庄)
- Chenxiangzhuang (陈相庄)
- Caodi (草地)
- Zhouxinzhuang (周辛庄)
- Dongzhaozhuang (东赵庄)
- Xiujiazhuang (修家庄)
- Huangliuzhuang (幌刘庄)
- Qianzhaozhuang (前赵庄)
- Tuonisi (坨泥寺)
- Dazhouzhuang (大周庄)
- Dongliangwo (东粮窝)
- Zao'anying (早安营)
- Wu'anying (五安营)
- Kangliuzhuang (康刘庄)
- Sulou (苏楼)
- Yuzhuangzi (于庄子)
- Nansancun (南三村)
- Beisancun (北三村委会)
- Xinzhuangsi (辛庄寺)
- Zhongsancun (中三村)
- Dianzicun (店子村)
- Xilücun (西吕村)
- Donglücun (东吕村)
- Nanxianhao (南县豪)
- Beixianhao (北县豪)
- Xidaliu (西大刘)
- Lixinzhuang (李辛庄)
- Dagongcheng Xicun (大宫城西村)
- Dagongcheng Dongcun (大宫城东村)
- Wangduzhuang (王杜庄)
- Xiaogongcheng (小宫城)
- Xicaozhuang (西曹庄)
- Zhoujiawu (周家务)
- Shenjiazhuang (沈家庄)
- Huaijiazhuang (槐家庄)
- Beijinzhuang (北靳庄)
- Dagongcheng Nancun (大宫城南村)

== See also ==
- List of township-level divisions of Tianjin
