= Wuqing, Tianjin =

Wuqing 武清区 Wutsing
- District
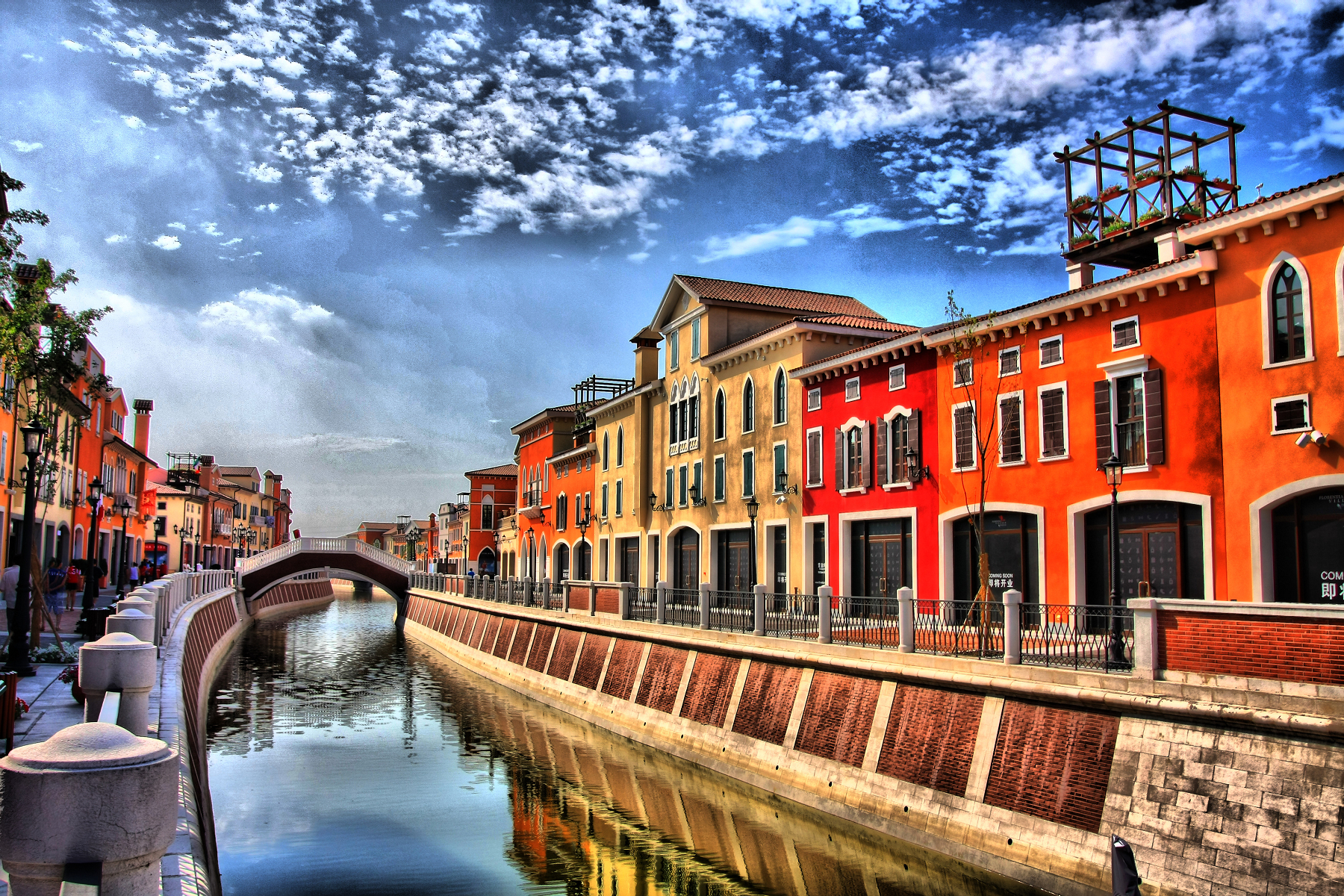
- Florentia Village in the district
- Coordinates: 39°23′03″N 117°02′40″E
- Country: People's Republic of China
- Municipality: Tianjin
- Township-level divisions: 6 subdistricts 24 towns

Area
  - Total: 1,570 km^{2} (610 sq mi)
- Elevation: 9 m (30 ft)

Population (2020 census)
  - Total: 1,153,235
  - Density: 735/km^{2} (1,900/sq mi)
- Time zone: UTC+8 (China Standard)
- Postal code: 301700
- Area code: 0022
Tianjin district map
Subdivisions of Tianjin
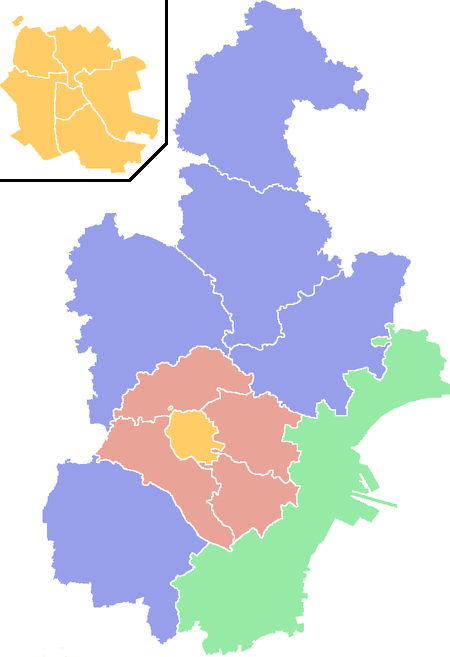
Core districts See inset
1	Heping
2	Hedong
3	Hexi
4	Nankai
5	Hebei
6	Hongqiao
Suburbs
7	Dongli
8	Xiqing
9	Jinnan
10	Beichen
Binhai and Rural
13	Binhai	14	Ninghe
11	Wuqing	15	Jinghai
12	Baodi	16	Ji Zhou
- Website: tjwq.gov.cn

Wuqing District (simplified Chinese: 武清区; traditional Chinese: 武清區; pinyin: Wǔqīng Qū) is a district of Tianjin, bordering Hebei province to the north and west, Beijing Municipality to the northwest, Baodi District to the northeast, and Beichen District and Xiqing District to the southeast/south.

== Administrative divisions ==
There are 6 subdistricts, 19 towns, and 5 townships in the district:

Name	Chinese (S)	Hanyu Pinyin	Population (2010)	Area (km^{2})
Yunhexi Subdistrict	运河西街道	Yùnhéxī Jiēdào	68,661	16.8
Yangcun Subdistrict (Yangtsun)	杨村街道	Yángcūn Jiēdào	45,947	24
Xuguantun Subdistrict	徐官屯街道	Xúguāntún Jiēdào	16,981	19
Xiazhuzhuang Subdistrict	下朱庄街道	Xiàzhūzhuāng Jiēdào	24,295	37.6
Huangzhuang Subdistrict	黄庄街道	Huángzhuāng Jiēdào	16,881	42
Dongpuwa Subdistrict	东蒲洼街道	Dōngpúwā Jiēdào	44,808	48.31
Dongmaquan town	东马圈镇	Dōngmǎquān Zhèn	15,850	38
Huanghuadian town	黄花店镇	Huánghuādiàn Zhèn	24,100	53
Shigezhuang town	石各庄镇	Shígèzhuāng Zhèn	23,309	45
Wangqingtuo town	王庆坨镇	Wángqìngtuó Zhèn	45,016	54
Chagugang town	汊沽港镇	Chàgūgǎng Zhèn	44,843	58.48
Chenzui town	陈咀镇	Chénzuǐ Zhèn	30,193	61.32
Meichang town	梅厂镇	Méichǎng Zhèn	35,033	70
Shangmatai town	上马台镇	Shàngmǎtái Zhèn	22,081	66
Cuihuangkou town	崔黄口镇	Cuīhuángkǒu Zhèn	51,541	90
Hebeitun town	河北屯镇	Héběitún Zhèn	30,418	45
Xiawuqi town	下伍旗镇	Xiàwǔqí Zhèn	23,889	50
Dajianchang town	大碱厂镇	Dàjiǎnchǎng Zhèn	22,323	35.24
Daliang town	大良镇	Dàliáng Zhèn	39,379	80.2
Chengguan town	城关镇	Chéngguān Zhèn	27,050	56
Damengzhuang town	大孟庄镇	Dàmèngzhuāng Zhèn	22,162	47
Sicundian town	泗村店镇	Sìcūndiàn Zhèn	17,247	52.6
Hexiwu town	河西务镇	Héxīwù Zhèn	45,814	70
Nancaicun town	南蔡村镇	Náncàicūn Zhèn	47,091	80
Dawangguzhuang town	大王古庄镇	Dàwánggǔzhuāng Zhèn	25,061	48.08
Douzhangzhuang town	豆张庄镇	Dòuzhāngzhuāng Zhèn	23,421	67
Dahuangbao town	大黄堡镇	Dàhuángbǎo Zhèn	18,432	102
Caozili town	曹子里镇	Cáozilǐ Zhèn	27,133	12.7
Baigutun town	白古屯镇	Báigǔtún Zhèn	21,443	53
Gaocun town	高村镇	Gāocūn Zhèn	18,210	43
developmental and farming zones			32,466	

== Climate ==
Climate data for Wuqing District, elevation 8 m (26 ft), (1991–2020 normals, extremes 1981–2010)
Month	Jan	Feb	Mar	Apr	May	Jun	Jul	Aug	Sep	Oct	Nov	Dec	Year
Record high °C (°F)	14.1 (57.4)	19.8 (67.6)	30.0 (86.0)	33.3 (91.9)	39.5 (103.1)	38.9 (102.0)	40.6 (105.1)	37.0 (98.6)	35.5 (95.9)	30.1 (86.2)	22.0 (71.6)	14.1 (57.4)	40.6 (105.1)
Mean daily maximum °C (°F)	2.0 (35.6)	5.9 (42.6)	13.1 (55.6)	21.1 (70.0)	27.1 (80.8)	30.6 (87.1)	31.7 (89.1)	30.7 (87.3)	26.6 (79.9)	19.5 (67.1)	10.3 (50.5)	3.4 (38.1)	18.5 (65.3)
Daily mean °C (°F)	−3.3 (26.1)	0.1 (32.2)	7.0 (44.6)	14.8 (58.6)	20.9 (69.6)	24.9 (76.8)	27.0 (80.6)	25.9 (78.6)	21.0 (69.8)	13.6 (56.5)	4.9 (40.8)	−1.5 (29.3)	12.9 (55.3)
Mean daily minimum °C (°F)	−7.6 (18.3)	−4.6 (23.7)	1.8 (35.2)	9.0 (48.2)	15.1 (59.2)	19.7 (67.5)	22.9 (73.2)	22.0 (71.6)	16.4 (61.5)	8.8 (47.8)	0.6 (33.1)	−5.4 (22.3)	8.2 (46.8)
Record low °C (°F)	−19.5 (−3.1)	−16.9 (1.6)	−9.3 (15.3)	−1.4 (29.5)	4.5 (40.1)	9.7 (49.5)	15.9 (60.6)	14.5 (58.1)	6.2 (43.2)	−3.4 (25.9)	−10.4 (13.3)	−19.9 (−3.8)	−19.9 (−3.8)
Average precipitation mm (inches)	2.0 (0.08)	5.0 (0.20)	5.9 (0.23)	22.5 (0.89)	34.8 (1.37)	76.9 (3.03)	158.7 (6.25)	116.7 (4.59)	55.5 (2.19)	29.0 (1.14)	13.6 (0.54)	2.4 (0.09)	523 (20.6)
Average precipitation days (≥ 0.1 mm)	1.4	1.8	2.7	4.4	5.8	9.1	11.6	9.3	6.6	4.7	3.0	1.5	61.9
Average snowy days	2.3	2.0	0.8	0.1	0	0	0	0	0	0	1.4	2.8	9.4
Average relative humidity (%)	52	51	47	48	53	64	75	76	70	63	61	56	60
Mean monthly sunshine hours	167.2	172.0	212.4	225.2	249.1	205.3	181.8	189.4	197.2	188.8	156.8	159.1	2,304.3
Percentage possible sunshine	55	56	57	57	56	46	40	45	53	55	53	55	52
Source: China Meteorological Administration
