= Xuguantun Subdistrict =

Subdistrict of Tianjin, China

Xuguantun Subdistrict 徐官屯街道
- Subdistrict
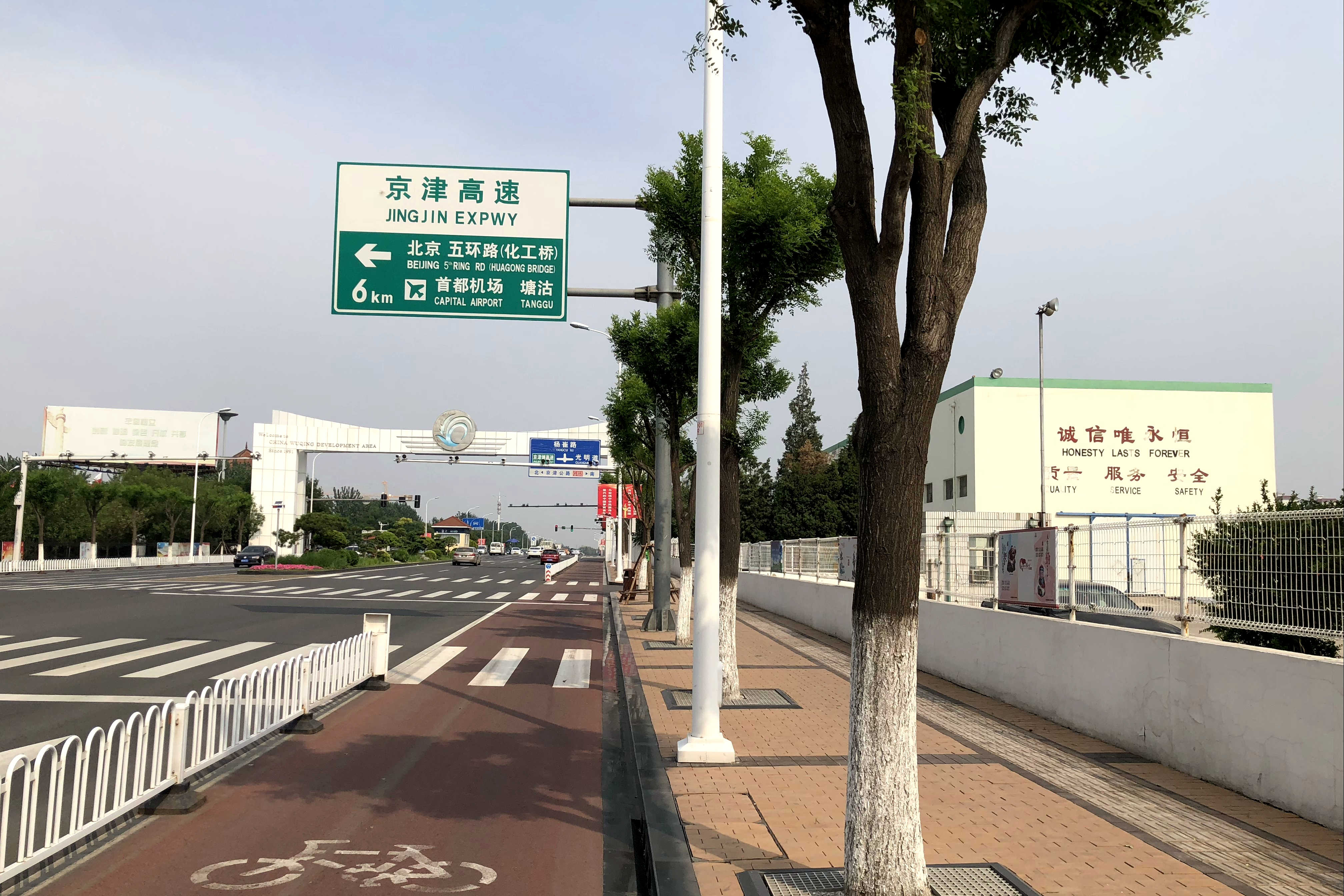
- Entrance of Wuqing Development Zone in the southern part of Xuguantun

- Location within Tianjin Location within China
- Coordinates: 39°23′52″N 117°04′41″E
- Country: China
- Municipality: Tianjin
- District: Wuqing
- Village-level Divisions: 4 communities 9 villages

Area
  - Total: 15.27 km^{2} (5.90 sq mi)
- Elevation: 7 m (23 ft)

Population (2010)
  - Total: 16,981
  - Density: 1,112/km^{2} (2,880/sq mi)
- Time zone: UTC+8 (CST)
- Postal code: 301722
- Area code: 022

Xuguantun Subdistrict (Chinese: 徐官屯街道; pinyin: Xúguāntún Jiēdào) is a subdistrict in Wuqing District, Tianjin, China. It shares border with Nancaicun and Dajianchang Towns in the north, Caozili and Meichang Towns in the east, Yunhexi and Yangcun Subdistricts in the south, and Dongpuwa Subdistrict in the west. Its population was 16,981 according to the 2010 Chinese census.

The subdistrict was named after Xuguantun (Chinese: 徐官屯; lit. 'Xu's Official Hamlet') Village, where the seat of the local government is located.

== Geography ==
Xuguantun Subdistrict is located on the south of Beijing Paiwu River, with the Grand Canal passing through its middle. The National Highway 103 crosses the western portion of the subdistrict. Its average elevation is seven meters above the sea level.

== History ==
Timetable of Yangcun Subdistrict
Years	Status	Part of
1982 - 1983	Within Yangcun People's Commune	Wuqing County, Tianjin
1983 - 1984	Yangcun Township	Wuqing County, Tianjin
1984 - 2000	Xuguantun Township	Wuqing County, Tianjin
2000 - 2001	Xuguantun Township	Wuqing District, Tianjin
2001 - present	Xuguantun Subdistrict	Wuqing District, Tianjin

== Administrative divisions ==
As of the year 2022, Xuguantun Subdistrict has 13 subdivisions, including 4 residential communities and 9 villages. They are listed below:

=== Residential communities ===
- Xinli (新丽)
- Caoyuan (曹园)
- Kongguantun (孔官屯)
- Jingrui Huayuan (景瑞花园)

=== Villages ===
- Xue Zhuang (薛庄)
- Fei Zhuang (费庄)
- Shagudui (沙古堆)
- Baojiaying (宝稼营)
- Ma Zhuang (马庄)
- Chu Zhuang (褚庄)
- Duan Zhuang (段庄)
- Xiaoxin Zhuang (小辛庄)
- Xinliu Zhuang (新刘庄)

== Galleries ==
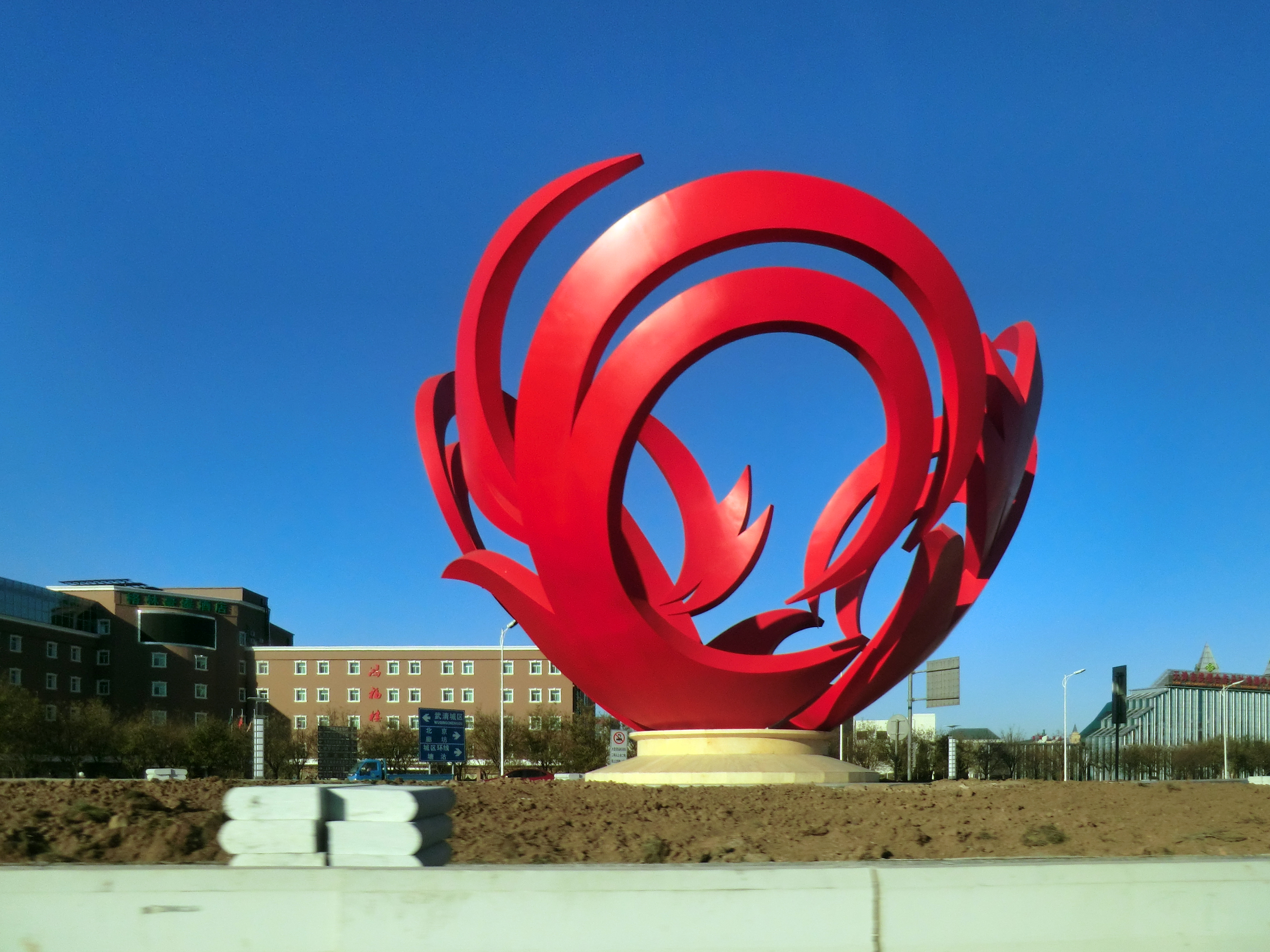
Monument along the National Highway 103

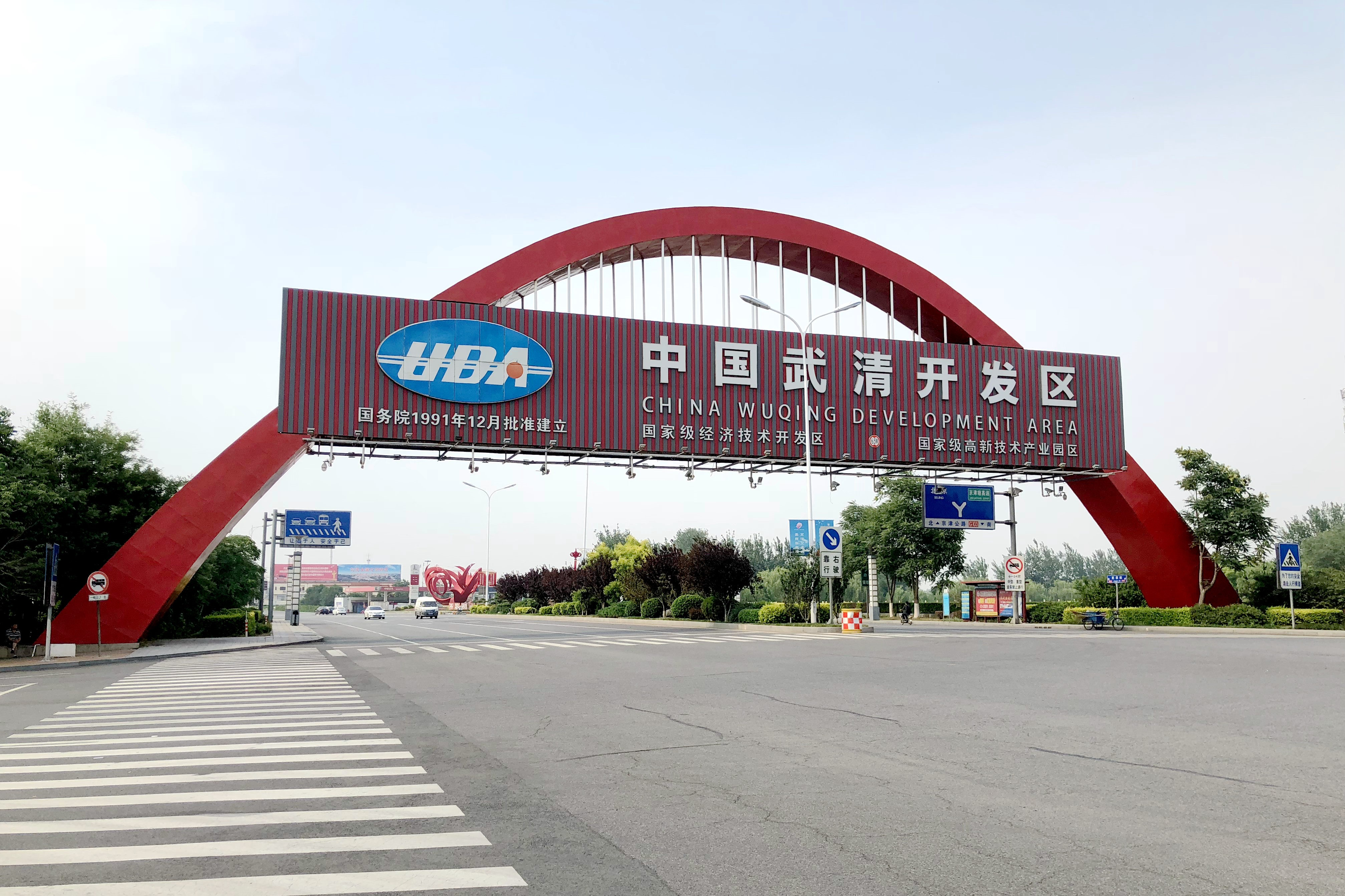
Wuqing Development Zone

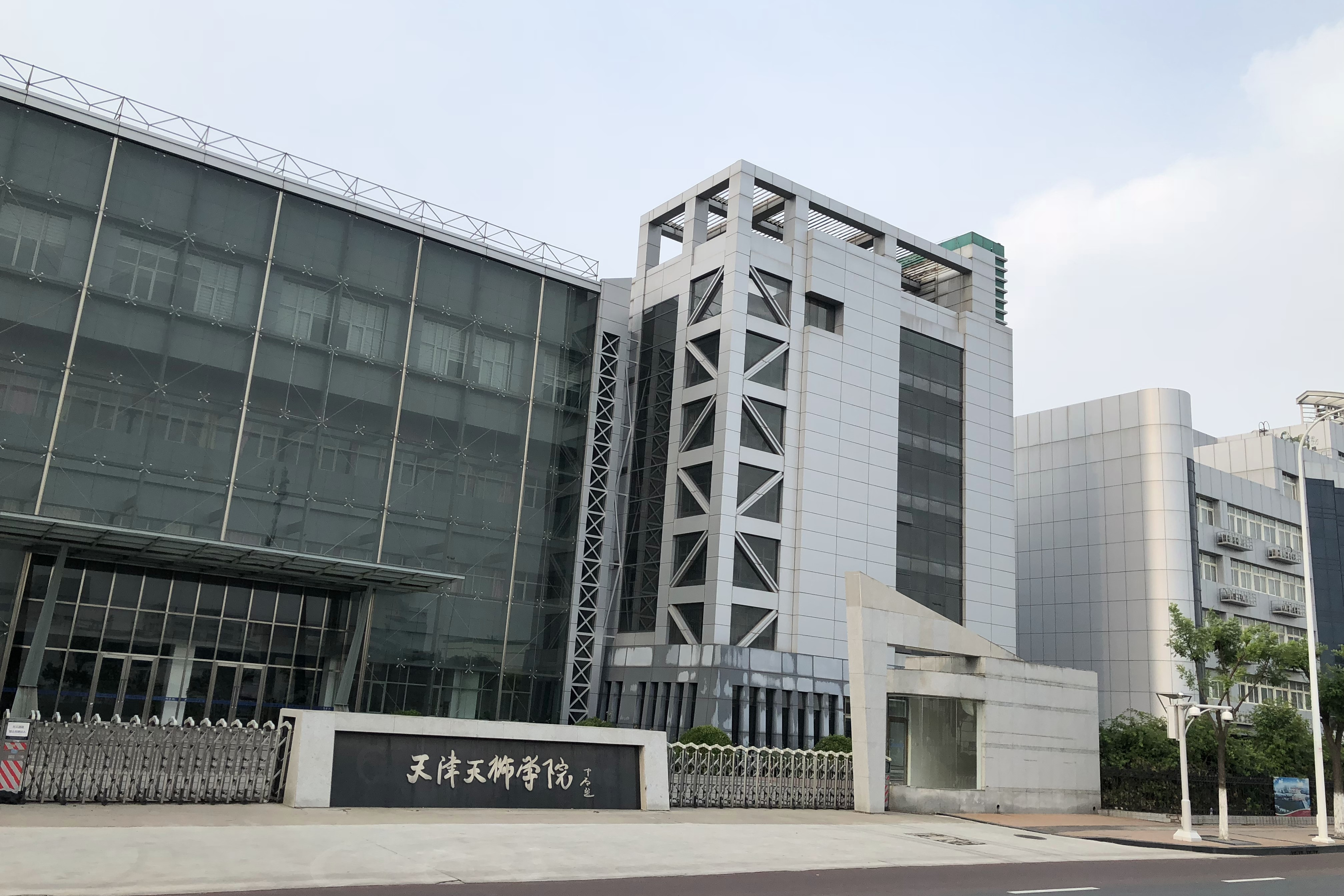
Tianjin Tianshi College

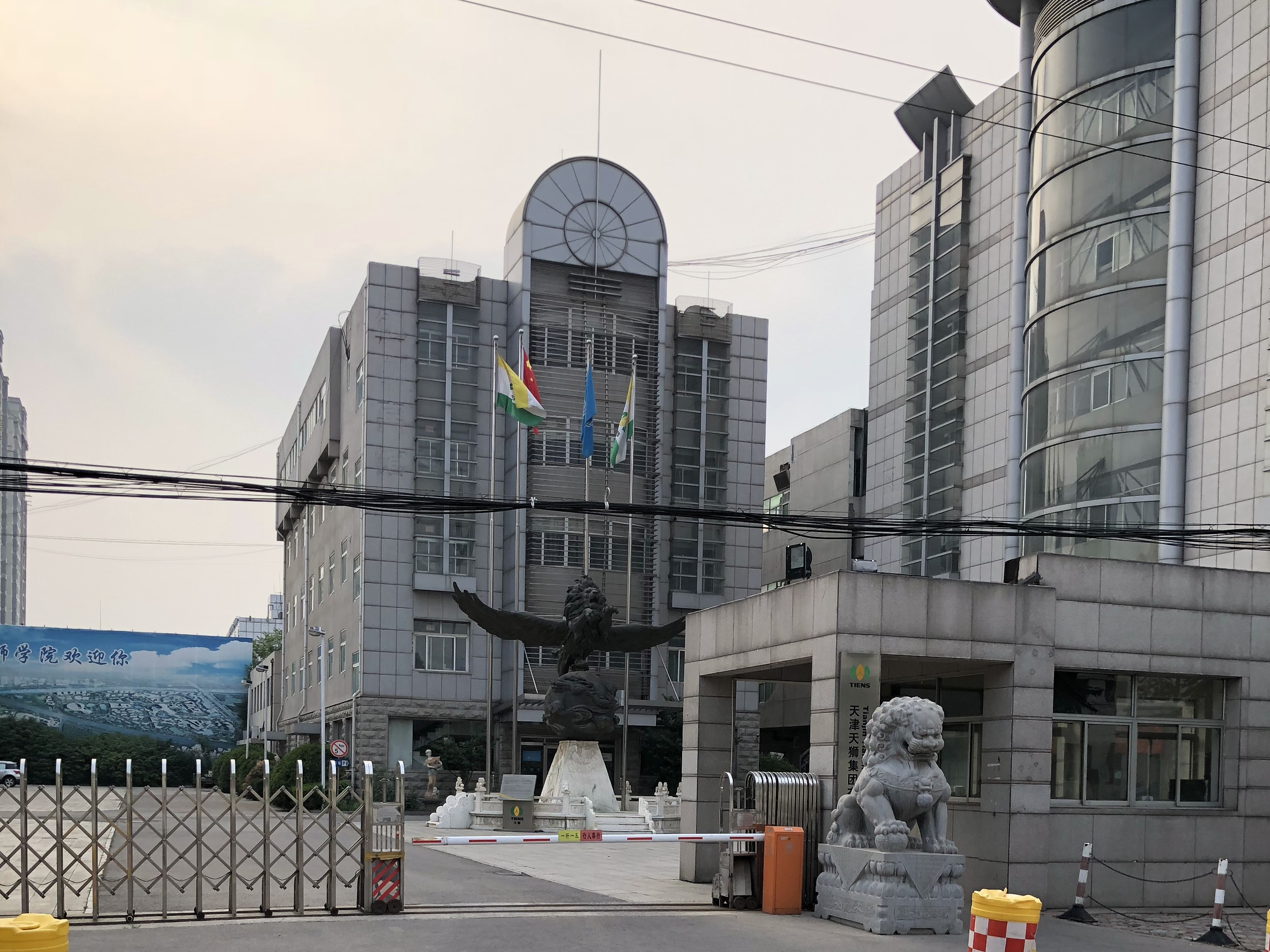
Headquarter of Tiens Group

== See also ==
- List of township-level divisions of Tianjin
