= Dongpuwa Subdistrict =

Subdistrict of Tianjin, China

Dongpuwa Subdistrict 东蒲洼街道
- Subdistrict
- Location within Tianjin Location within China
- Coordinates: 39°25′16″N 117°00′18″E
- Country: China
- Municipality: Tianjin
- District: Wuqing
- Village-level Divisions: 29 communities

Area
  - Total: 48.31 km^{2} (18.65 sq mi)
- Elevation: 8 m (26 ft)

Population (2010)
  - Total: 44,808
  - Density: 927.5/km^{2} (2,402/sq mi)
- Time zone: UTC+8 (CST)
- Postal code: 301726
- Area code: 022

Dongpuwa Subdistrict (simplified Chinese: 东蒲洼街道; traditional Chinese: 東蒲窪街道; pinyin: Dōngpúwā Jiēdào) is a subdistrict situated on the center of Wuqing District, Tianjin, China. It shares border with Sicundian and Nancaicun Towns in its north, Xuguantun and Yunhexi Subdistricts in its east, Huangzhuang Subdistrict in its south, and Douzhangzhuang Town in its west. According to the 2010 Chinese Census, the population for this subdistrict was 48,808.

The name Dongpuwa (Chinese: 东蒲洼; lit. 'East Bulrush Ditch') originated from the foundation of settlement here the Ming dynasty, and it was referring to the area's low-lying position near the Dongfeng River.

== Geography ==
Dongpuwa Subdistrict is situated at the south of Longfeng River. The National Highway 103 passes through the northeastern corner of the subdistrict. Its average elevation is 8 meters above the sea level.

== History ==
History of Yangcun Subdistrict
Years	Status	Part of
1973 - 1982	Dadunqiu People's Commune	Wuqing County, Tianjin
1982 - 1983	Dongpuwa People's Commune	Wuqing County, Tianjin
1983 - 2000	Donpuwa Township	Wuqing County, Tianjin
2000 - 2001	Donpuwa Township	Wuqing District, Tianjin
2001 - present	Dongpuwa Subdistrict	Wuqing District, Tianjin

== Administrative divisions ==
By 2022, Dongpuwa Subdistrict is made up of 29 residential communities. They are as follows:

- Yi'an Xi (颐安西)
- Hengtong Huayuan Xiqu
  (亨通花园西区)
- Hengtong Huayuan Dongqu Nanli
  (亨通花园东区南里)
- Hengtong Huayuan Dongqu Beili
  (亨通花园东区北里)
- Cuijing Yuan (翠景园)
- Bei'an Shangcheng (北岸尚城)
- Cuiheng Xi (翠亨西)
- Heyue Huayuan (和悦花园)
- Shanghe Yayuan Diyi Shequ
  (上河雅苑第一社区)
- Shanghe Yayuan Di'er Shequ
  (上河雅苑第二社区)
- Shanghe Yayuan Disan Shequ
  (上河雅苑第三社区)
- Purui Xiangyuan Dongqu
  (蒲瑞祥园东区)
- Purui Xiangyuan Zhongqu
  (蒲瑞祥园中区)
- Purui Xiangyuan Xiqu
  (蒲瑞祥园西区)
- Purui Xinyuan Dongqu Beili
  (蒲瑞馨园东区北里)
- Purui Xinyuan Dongqu Nanli
  (蒲瑞馨园东区南里)
- Purui Xinyuan Xiqu
  (蒲瑞馨园西区)
- Purui Heyuan (蒲瑞和园)
- Shengshi Jiayuan (盛世家园)
- Haitang Wan (海棠湾)
- Fengdan Tiancheng (枫丹天城)
- Shengshi Ruiyuan (盛世睿园)
- Xihe Yuan (熙和园)
- Shangyue Ju (尚悦居)
- Huajing Tingyuan (华景庭苑)
- Yujin Yuan (玉锦园)
- Aolai Huayuan (奥来花园)
- Jinxiang Yuan (金祥园)
- Xuezhi Huating (学知华庭)

== See also ==
- List of township-level divisions of Tianjin
