= Yangcun Subdistrict =

Subdistrict of Tianjin, China

Yangcun Subdistrict 杨村街道
- Subdistrict
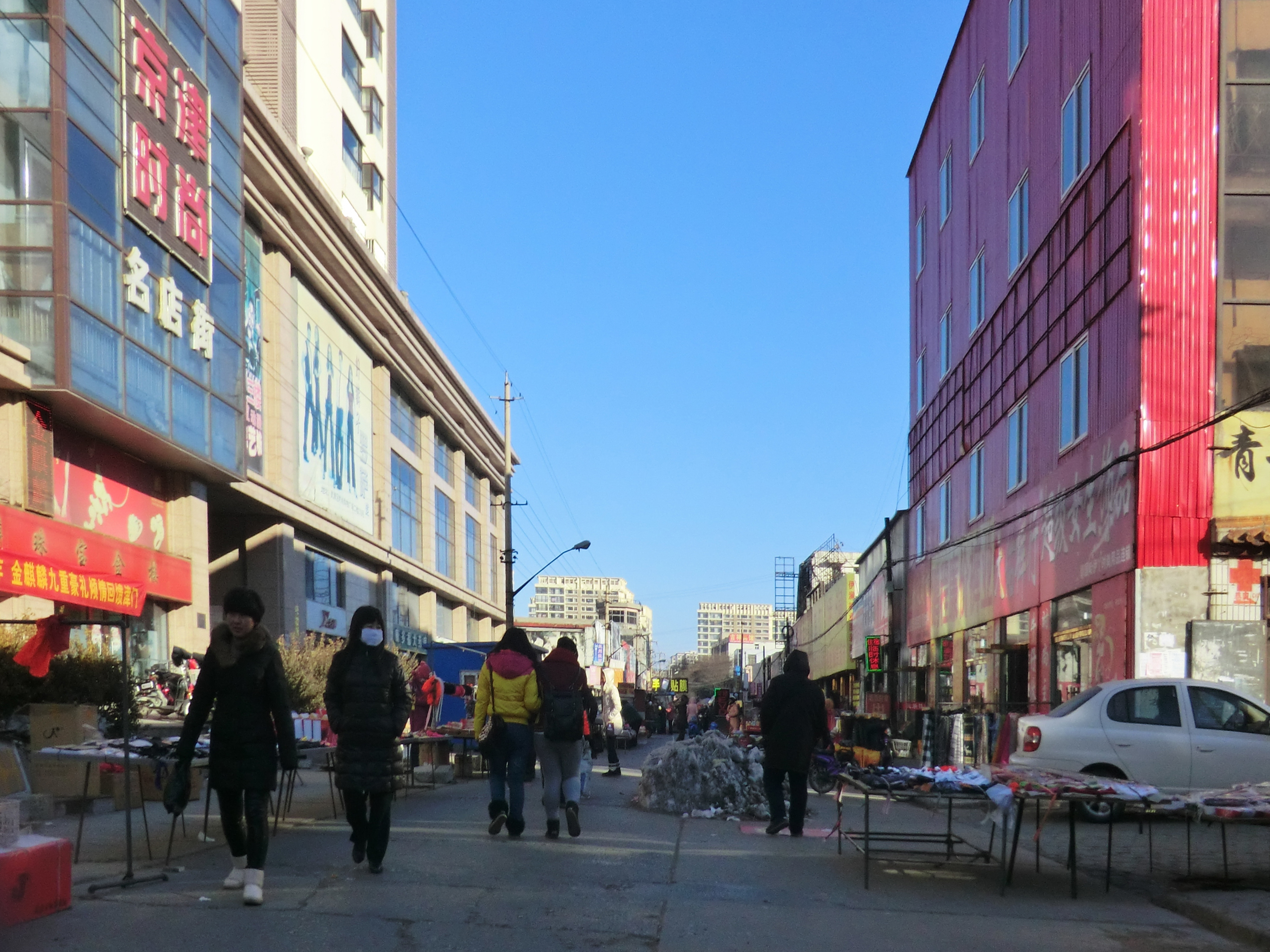
- Shopping street in Shengli Lu Residential Community within the subdistrict.

- Location within Tianjin Location within China
- Coordinates: 39°22′49″N 117°04′11″E
- Country: China
- Municipality: Tianjin
- District: Wuqing
- Village-level Divisions: 13 communities

Area
  - Total: 15.86 km^{2} (6.12 sq mi)
- Elevation: 7 m (23 ft)

Population (2010)
  - Total: 45,947
  - Density: 2,897/km^{2} (7,503/sq mi)
- Time zone: UTC+8 (CST)
- Postal code: 301700
- Area code: 022

Yangcun Subdistrict (simplified Chinese: 杨村街道; traditional Chinese: 楊村街道; pinyin: Yángcūn Jiēdào) is a subdistrict located in the south portion of Wuqing District, Tianjin, China. It shares border with Xuguantun Subdistrict in its north, Meichang Town in its east, Xiazhuzhuang Subdistrict in its south, and Yunhexi Subdistrict in its west. As of 2010, it is home to a population of 45,947.

The area was named "Yangcun" (Chinese: 杨村; lit. 'Yang's Village') due to Yang being the dominant family at the founding of the settlement in the Song dynasty.

== Geography ==
Yangcun Subdistrict is located to the east of the Grand Canal. The National Highway 103 passes through its west. Its average elevation is 7 meters above the sea level.

== History ==
Timeline of Yangcun Subdistrict
Years	Status	Part of
1950 - 1958	Yangcun Town	Wuqing County, Hebei
1958 - 1973	Yangcun People's Commune	Wuqing County, Hebei
1973 - 1982	Yangcun People's Commune	Wuqing County, Tianjin
1982 - 2000	Yangcun Town	Wuqing County, Tianjin
2000 - 2001	Yangcun Town	Wuqing District, Tianjin
2001 - present	Yangcun Subdistrict	Wuqing District, Tianjin

== Administrative divisions ==
As of the year 2022, Yangcun Subdistrict oversees 13 residential communities. They are listed as follows:

- Wenhua Xiang (文华巷)
- Tuanjie Lu (团结路)
- Shengli Lu (胜利路)
- Nanlou (南楼)
- Zhanbei Lu (站北路)
- Yucai Nanli (育才南里)
- Youyi Li (友谊里)
- Dongwang Xiang (东旺巷)
- Yangguang Jiayuan (阳光家园)
- Jinhui Wan (金汇湾)
- Xinwan Huayuan Dong (新湾花园东)
- Xinwan Huayuan Xi (新湾花园西)
- Yunze Huayuan (运泽花园)

== Galleries ==
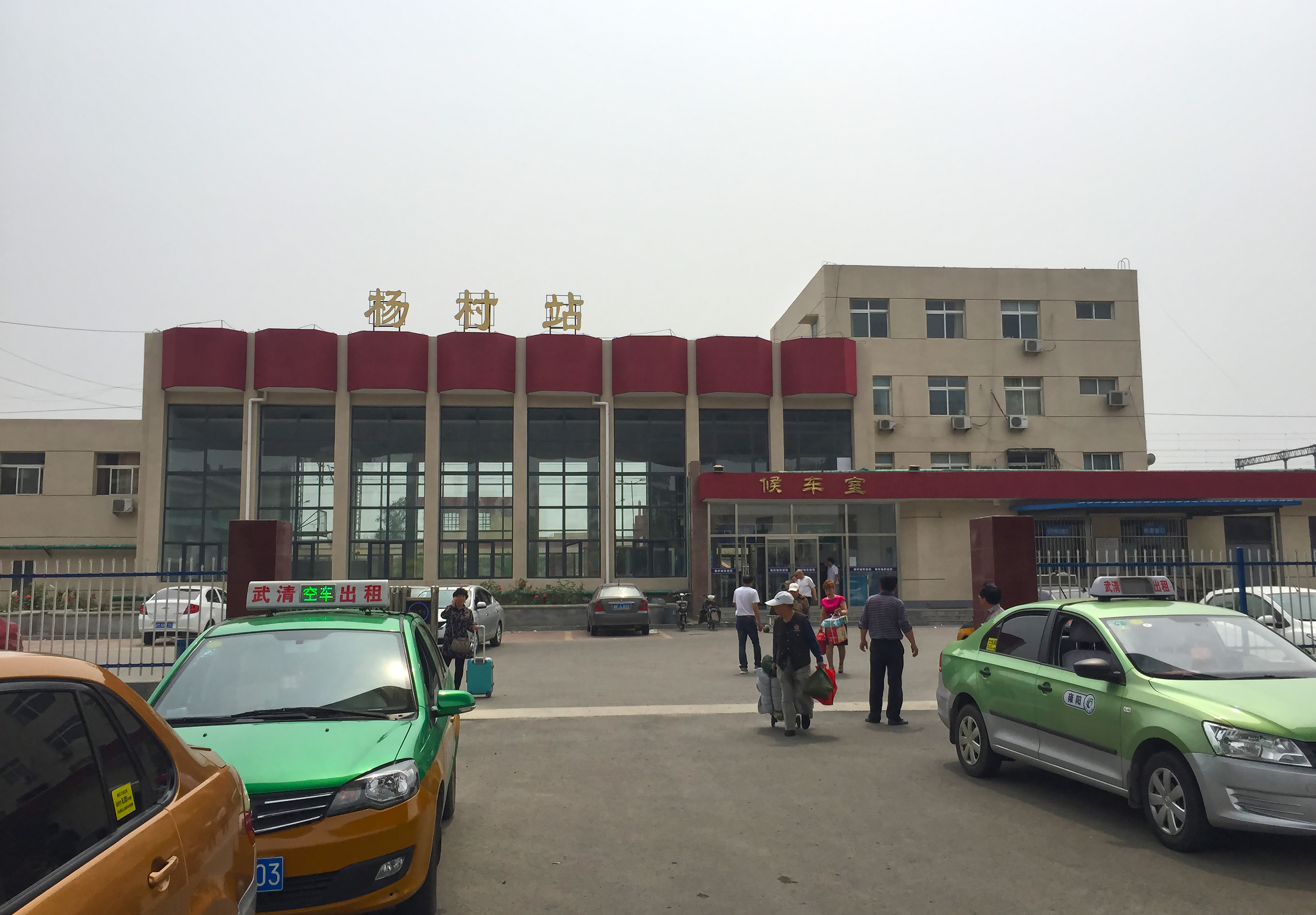
Yangcun Railway Station on the south of the subdistrict

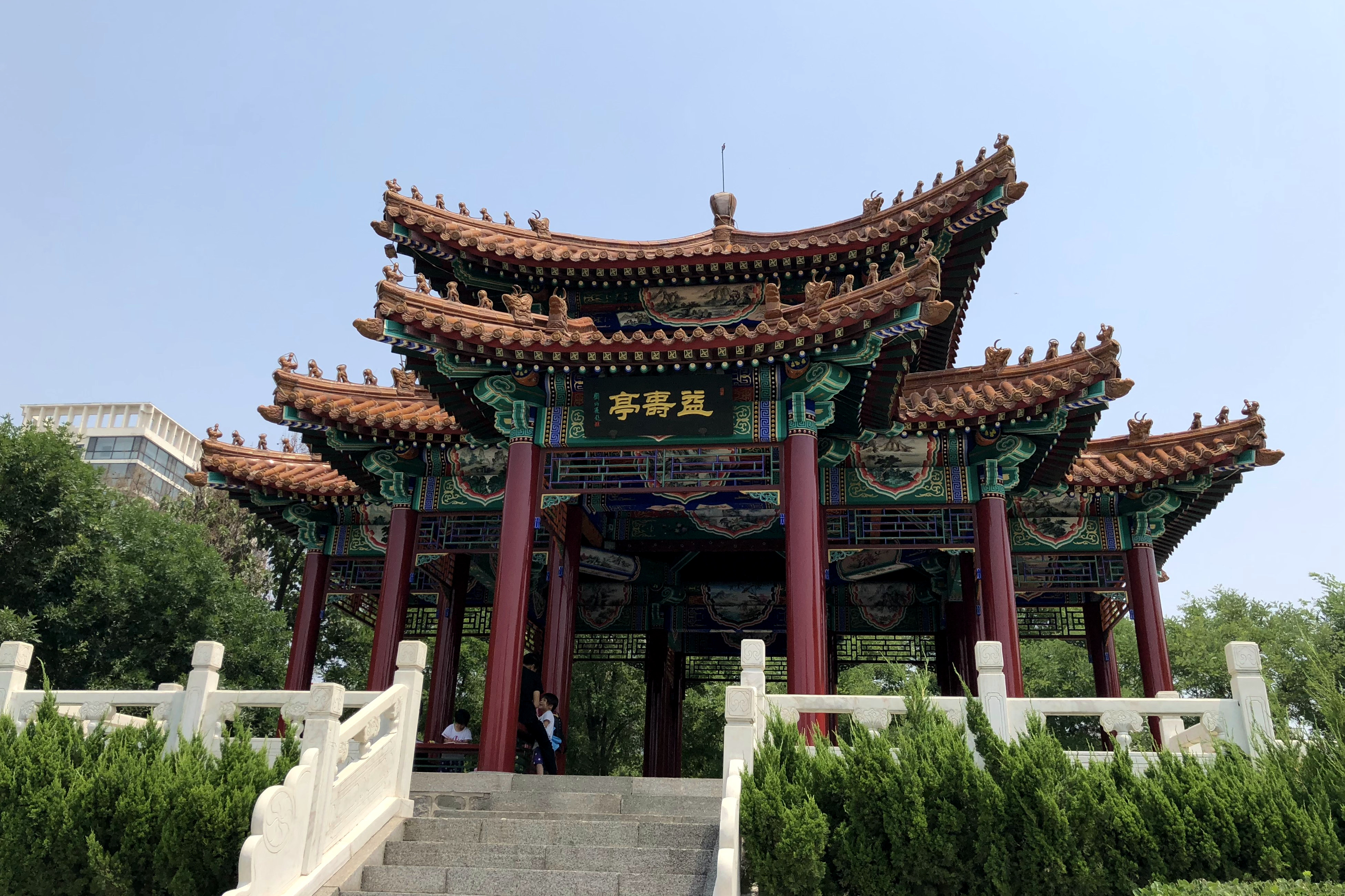
Yishou Pavilion

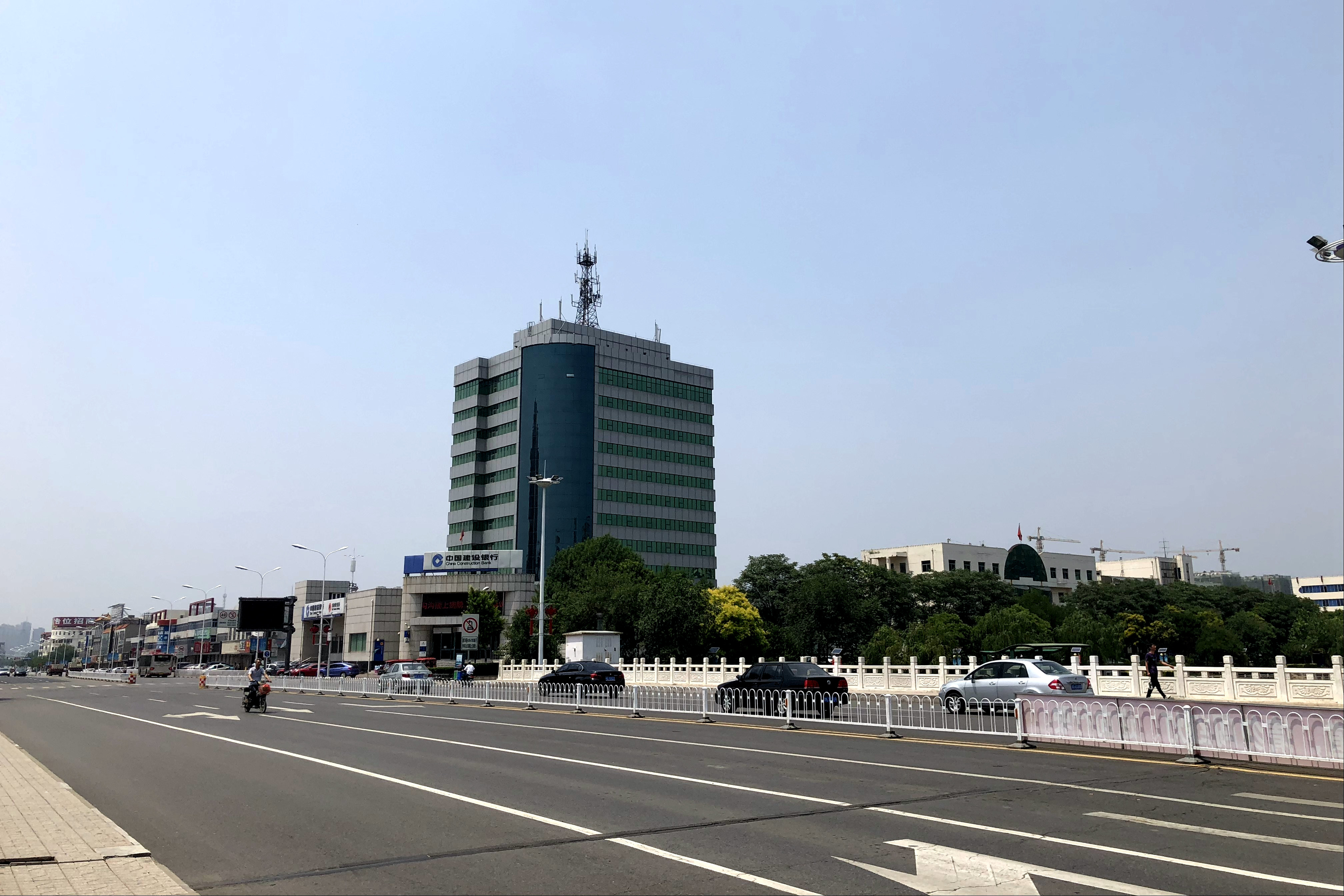
Yongyang Bridge across the Grand Canal

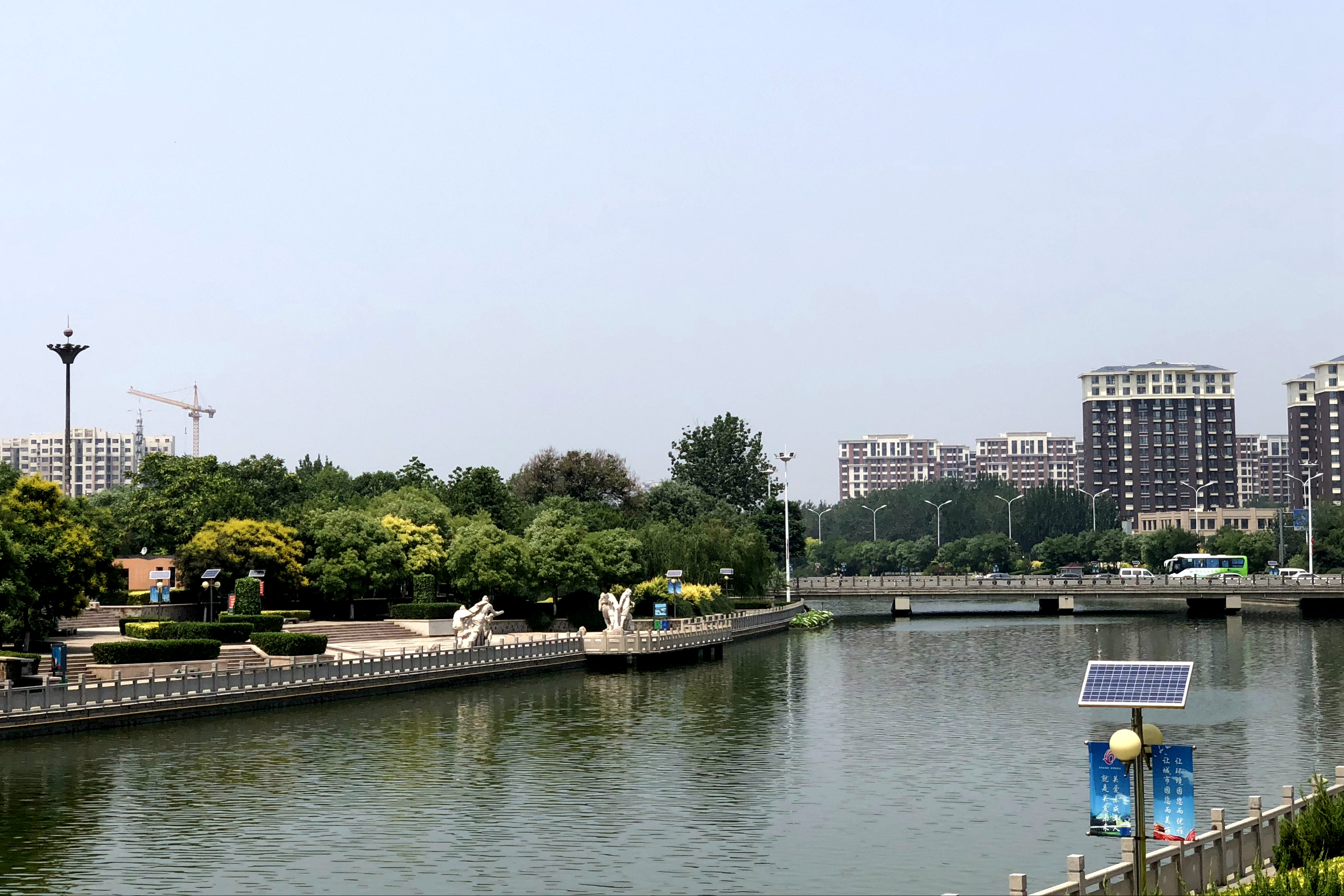
Section of the Grand Canal near Guangming Bridge

== See also ==
- List of township-level divisions of Tianjin
