= China National Highway 103 =

Road in China

National Highway 103
- 103国道

Route information
- Length: 162 km (101 mi)

Major junctions
- From: Tongzhou, Beijing
- To: Binhai, Tianjin

Location
- Country: China

Highway system
- National Trunk Highway System; Primary; Auxiliary
← G102	→ G104

China National Highway 103 (G103) is the main traffic corridor between Beijing and Tianjin. It goes from Tongzhou Beijing to Tianjin and then to the coastal area of Binhai on the outskirts of Tianjin, and runs to approximately 162 km.

This is the shortest China National Highway within those that start from 1.

== Route and distance ==
Route and distance

City	Distance (km)
Beijing, Beijing	0
Tongzhou, Beijing	22
Wuqing, Tianjin	88
Tianjin, Tianjin	109
Tanggu, Tianjin	149

== See also ==
- China National Highways
