= Daliang, Tianjin =

Town in Tianjin, China

Daliang Town 大良镇
- Town
- Location within Tianjin Location within China
- Coordinates: 39°32′30″N 117°05′20″E
- Country: China
- Municipality: Tianjin
- District: Wuqing
- Village-level Divisions: 2 communities 56 villages

Area
  - Total: 77.24 km^{2} (29.82 sq mi)
- Elevation: 8 m (26 ft)

Population (2010)
  - Total: 39,379
  - Density: 509.8/km^{2} (1,320/sq mi)
- Time zone: UTC+8 (CST)
- Postal code: 301703
- Area code: 022

Daliang Town (simplified Chinese: 大良镇; traditional Chinese: 大良鎮; pinyin: Dàliáng Zhèn) is a town located within Wuqing District, Tianjin, China. It borders Xiawuqi and Hebeitun Towns to its north, Cuihuangkou Town to its east, Nancaicun Town to its south, as well as Damengzhuang and Hexiwu Towns to its west. Its population was 39,379 in 2010.

The town's name Daliang (Chinese: 大良; lit. 'Great Excellence') came from Daliang Village, where the current town government is located in.

== Geography ==
Daliang Town is situated on the east of the Grand Canal. The Jingjin Expressway crosses the south of the town. Its average elevation is 8 meters above the sea level.

== History ==
Timeline of Daliang Town
Years	Status	Under
1958 - 1973	Daliang People's Commune	Wuqing County, Hebei
1973 - 1983	Daliang People's Commune	Wuqing County, Tianjin
1983 - 1990	Daliang Township	Wuqing County, Tianjin
1990 - 2000	Daliang Town	Wuqing County, Tianjin
2000 - present	Daliang Town	Wuqing District, Tianjin

== Administrative divisions ==
By 2022, Daliang Town oversees 57 subdivisions, including 2 residential community and 55 villages. They are listed as follows:

=== Residential communities ===
- Linyu Huayuan (林语花园)
- Muxiuyuan (木秀园)

=== Villages ===
- Daliang (大良)
- Nanyanzhuang (南闫庄)
- Xisuzhuang (西苏庄)
- Houjiazhuang (侯家庄)
- Qianshatuo (前沙坨)
- Houshatuo (后沙坨)
- Panggezhuang (庞各庄)
- Datiesu (打铁苏)
- Enjiazhuang (恩家庄)
- Liujiawu (刘家务)
- Maxinzhuang (马辛庄)
- Liqianhu (李千户)
- Xiaozhouzhuang (小周庄)
- Yingmenzhao (营门赵)
- Anjiawu (安家务)
- Tundizhuang (屯底庄)
- Xizhaozhuang (西赵庄)
- Jiantuzhuang (碱土庄)
- Houying (后营)
- Dongying (东营)
- Xiying (西营)
- Chaomizhuang (炒米庄)
- Yangchang (杨场)
- Dongcuizhuang (东崔庄)
- Beixiaoliang (北小良)
- Yangxinfang (杨辛房)
- Haiziwa (海自洼)
- Xiangyang (向阳)
- Beixiaoying (北小营)
- Beiyaoshang (北窑上)
- Huangxinzhuang (黄辛庄)
- Jinxinzhuang (金辛庄)
- Zhangzhuang (张庄)
- Huosi (霍寺)
- Qianganzhuang (前赶庄)
- Houganzhuang (后赶庄)
- Nanzhaozhuang (南赵庄)
- Qianyisi (前迤寺)
- Zhongyisi (中迤寺)
- Houyisi (后迤寺)
- Shuangshu (双树)
- Caigezhuang (蔡各庄)
- Xiaowangfu (小王甫)
- Fuguantun (富官屯)
- Mengcun (蒙村)
- Mengxinzhuang (蒙辛庄)
- Nansibaihu (南四百户)
- Xiaohe (小河)
- Baizhaozhuang (北赵庄)
- Xiaoshibaihu (小十百户)
- Dashibaihu (大十百户)
- Shangjiubaihu (上九百户)
- Erbaihu (二百户)
- Beisibaihu (北四百户)
- Tianshuipu (田水铺)

== See also ==
- List of township-level divisions of Tianjin
