= Dacheng =

Dacheng may refer to:

== Places ==
=== Mainland China ===
- Dacheng County, Hebei
- Dacheng Hill, a hill in Tangshan, Hebei
- Dacheng Subdistrict, Tianshui, Qinzhou District, Tianshui, Gansu
- Dacheng Subdistrict, Harbin, Nangang District, Harbin, Heilongjiang
- Dacheng, Jiangxi, a town in Gao'an
- Dacheng, Maoming, Xinyi, Guangdong
- Dacheng, Guangxi, Pubei County
- Dacheng, Hainan, Danzhou
- Dacheng, Sichuan, Xuanhan County

=== Taiwan ===
- Dacheng, Changhua, a township in Changhua County

== People ==
- Dacheng Ren (fl. 21st century), Chinese-born American biochemist and bioengineer
- Ruan Dacheng (c. 1587–1646), Chinese dramatist, poet and official
- Dacheng Tao (fl. 21st century), Australian computer scientist
- Wu Dacheng (1835–1902), Chinese politician, governor, author and artist

== Other uses ==
- Mahayana Buddhism, (Dàchéng or Dàshèng in Chinese)
- Dacheng Law Offices, an international law firm headquartered in Beijing
- Dacheng or Dazhou–Chengdu railway, Sichuan Province, China

== See also ==
- Dacheng quan or Yiquan, a Chinese martial art
