= Wenhua =

Wenhua may refer to:

== People ==
- Wang Wenhua (disambiguation)
- Pan Wenhua (潘文華; 1886–1950), Kuomintang general
- Wei Wenhua (魏文华; 1967–2008), general manager of Shuili Architectural Engineering
- Dong Wenhua (董文华; 1962– ), Chinese PLA singer
- Zhen Wenhua (甄文华; 1967– ), Chinese female shot put athlete

== Institutions ==
- Wenhua Film Company (文華影業公司), former privately owned Chinese filmmaking company
- Wenhua Qiaoliang Trilingual National School (文化桥梁三语国民学校) in Bali, Indonesia
- National Wen-Hua Senior High School (文華高中), in Taichung, Republic of China (Taiwan)
- The Culture Arts Review, also known as Wen Hwa or Wenhua, Shanghai magazine

== Places in the People's Republic of China ==
Wenhua Community (文化社区)

- Wenhua, Zhucheng, in Zhucheng Subdistrict, Xinzhou District, Wuhan, Hubei

Wenhua Subdistrict (文化街道)

- Wenhua Subdistrict, Harbin, in Nangang District, Harbin, Heilongjiang
- Wenhua Subdistrict, Qiqihar, in Jianhua District, Qiqihar, Heilongjiang
- Wenhua Subdistrict, Shangqiu, in Suiyang District, Shangqiu, Henan
- Wenhua Subdistrict, Helong, Jilin
- Wenhua Subdistrict, Songyuan, in Ningjiang District, Songyuan, Jilin
- Wenhua Subdistrict, Yantai, in Muping District, Yantai, Shandong

Wenhua Road Subdistrict (文化路街道)

- Wenhua Road Subdistrict, Qinhuangdao, in Haigang District, Qinhuangdao, Hebei
- Wenhua Road Subdistrict, Tangshan, in Lubei District, Tangshan, Hebei
- Wenhua Road Subdistrict, Zunhua, Hebei
- Wenhua Road Subdistrict, Zhengzhou, in Jinshui District, Zhengzhou, Henan
- Wenhua Road Subdistrict, Zaozhuang, in Shizhong District, Zaozhuang, Shandong
