= Xiaoshan Subdistrict =

Xiaoshan Subdistrict 小山街道
- Subdistrict

Chinese transcription(s)
- Location in Hebei
- Country: China
- Province: Hebei
- Prefecture: Tangshan

Area
  - Total: 4.7 km^{2} (1.8 sq mi)

Population (2020)
  - Total: 14,800
  - Density: 3,100/km^{2} (8,200/sq mi)
- Time zone: UTC+8 (China Standard Time)

Xiaoshan Subdistrict (Chinese: 小山街道; pinyin: Xiǎoshān Jiēdào) is a subdistrict of Lunan District, Tangshan, Hebei, China. The subdistrict spans an area of 4.7 square kilometres (1.8 mi^{2}), and has a hukou population of 14,800.

== History ==
Xiaoshan Subdistrict was a prominent early industrial center in Tangshan, dating back to the late 19th century. In 1877, the Qing dynasty government opened a mine in the southern portion of Qiaotun (Chinese: 乔屯; pinyin: Qiáotún), within present-day Xiaoshan Subdistrict. The area's industry propelled the area to become a major commercial hub within Tangshan prior to the Japanese invasion of China.

== Geography ==
The subdistrict is located within the eastern portion of Lunan District, adjacent to the Beijing–Shanhaiguan railway. The subdistrict's western border with Yonghongqiao Subdistrict is formed by Fuxing Road (Chinese: 复兴路). Xiaoshan Subdistrict is bordered to the east by Wenhuabeihou Street Subdistrict. The subdistrict's southern border with Nüzhizhai Township is formed by Jixiang Road (Chinese: 吉祥路).

== Administrative divisions ==
Xiaoshan Subdistrict administers the following seven residential communities (Chinese: 社区; pinyin: Shèqū):

- Shuangqiaoli Community (Chinese: 双桥里社区)
- Songnanli Community (Chinese: 宋南里社区)
- Xiaoshanlongyili Community (Chinese: 小山隆义里社区)
- Huayuanli Community (Chinese: 花园里社区)
- Lianheli Community (Chinese: 联合里社区)
- Nanchangxili Community (Chinese: 南厂西里社区)
- Nanchangdongli Community (Chinese: 南厂东里社区)

== See also ==
- List of township-level divisions of Hebei
