= Nüzhizhai Town =

Coordinates: 39.59624°N 118.2004°E

Nüzhizhai Town 女织寨镇
- Subdistrict

Chinese transcription(s)
- Interactive map of Nüzhizhai Town
- Country: China
- Province: Hebei
- Prefecture: Tangshan
- Time zone: UTC+8 (China Standard Time)

Nüzhizhai Township (Chinese: 女织寨镇) is a township-level division of Lunan District, Tangshan, Hebei, China.

== See also ==
- List of township-level divisions of Hebei
