= Youyi Subdistrict, Tangshan =

Coordinates: 39.61986°N 118.13131°E

Youyi Subdistrict 友谊街道
- Subdistrict

Chinese transcription(s)
- Interactive map of Youyi Subdistrict
- Country: China
- Province: Hebei
- Prefecture: Tangshan
- Time zone: UTC+8 (China Standard Time)

Youyi Subdistrict (Chinese: 友谊街道) is a township-level division of Lunan District, Tangshan, Hebei, China.

== See also ==
- List of township-level divisions of Hebei
