= Dongxincun Subdistrict =

Dongxincun Subdistrict 东新村街道
- Subdistrict
- Location in Hebei
- Coordinates: 39°38′34″N 118°13′37″E
- Country: People's Republic of China
- Province: Hebei
- Prefecture-level city: Tangshan
- District: Lubei
- Village-level divisions: 7 residential communities
- Elevation: 28 m (92 ft)
- Time zone: UTC+8 (China Standard)
- Area code: 0315

Dongxincun Subdistrict (simplified Chinese: 东新村街道; traditional Chinese: 東新村街道; pinyin: Dōngxīncūn Jiēdào; lit. 'east new village') is a subdistrict of Lubei District in the east of Tangshan, Hebei, People's Republic of China. As of 2011, it has 7 residential communities (社区) under its administration.

== See also ==
- List of township-level divisions of Hebei
