= Gangyao Subdistrict =

Gangyao Subdistrict 缸窑街道
- Subdistrict
- Location in Hebei
- Coordinates: 39°39′43″N 118°12′17″E
- Country: People's Republic of China
- Province: Hebei
- Prefecture-level city: Shijiazhuang
- District: Lubei
- Village-level divisions: 11 residential communities
- Elevation: 31 m (102 ft)
- Time zone: UTC+8 (China Standard)
- Area code: 0315

Gangyao Subdistrict (simplified Chinese: 缸窑街道; traditional Chinese: 缸窯街道; pinyin: Gāngyáo Jiēdào; lit. 'jar kiln') is a subdistrict of Lubei District, Tangshan, Hebei, People's Republic of China. As of 2011, it has 11 residential communities (居委会) under its administration.

== See also ==
- List of township-level divisions of Hebei
