= Jichang Road Subdistrict =

Jichang Road Subdistrict 机场路街道
- Subdistrict
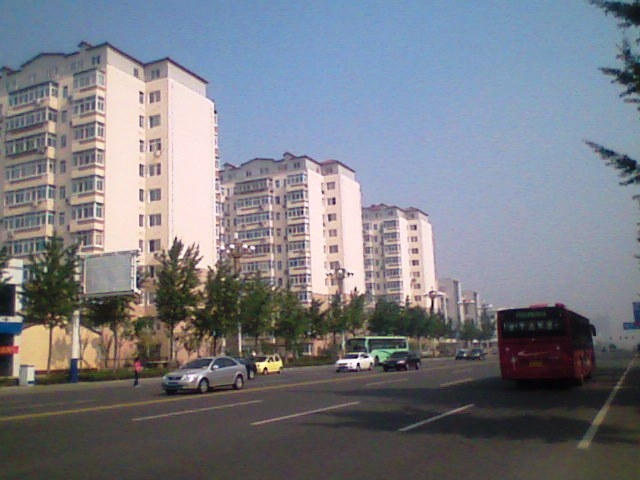
- Jichang District

- Location in Hebei
- Coordinates: 39°39′12″N 118°10′11″E
- Country: People's Republic of China
- Province: Hebei
- Prefecture-level city: Tangshan
- District: Lubei
- Village-level divisions: 17 residential communities
- Elevation: 32 m (105 ft)
- Time zone: UTC+8 (China Standard)
- Area code: 0315

Jichang Road Subdistrict (simplified Chinese: 机场路街道; traditional Chinese: 機場路街道; pinyin: Jīchǎng Lù Jiēdào) is a subdistrict of Lubei District, Tangshan, Hebei, People's Republic of China. As of 2018, it had 17 residential communities (社区) under its administration.

== See also ==
- List of township-level divisions of Hebei
