= Guangming Subdistrict, Tangshan =

Guangming Subdistrict 光明街道
- Subdistrict
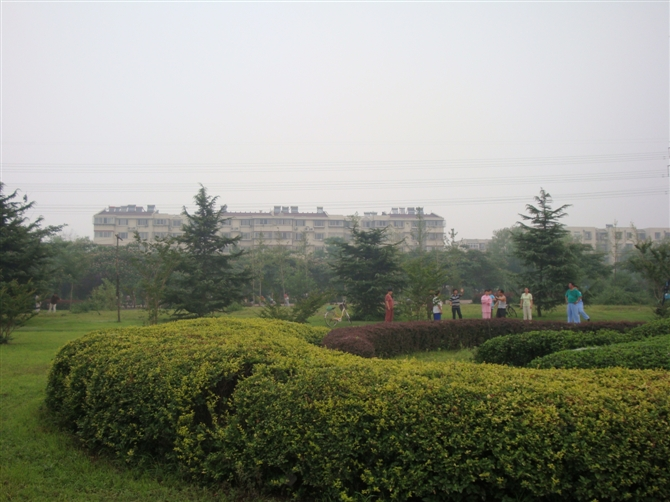
- Guangming

- Location in Hebei
- Coordinates: 39°37′34″N 118°07′26″E
- Country: People's Republic of China
- Province: Hebei
- Prefecture-level city: Tangshan
- District: Lubei
- Village-level divisions: 16 residential communities
- Elevation: 20 m (66 ft)
- Time zone: UTC+8 (China Standard)
- Postal code: 063000
- Area code: 0315

Guangming Subdistrict (Chinese: 光明街道; pinyin: Guāngmíng Jiēdào) is a subdistrict of Lubei District, in the heart of Tangshan, Hebei, People's Republic of China. As of 2011, it has 16 residential communities (社区) under its administration.

== See also ==
- List of township-level divisions of Hebei
