= Guoyuan, Hebei =

Guoyuan 果园镇
- Town
- Location in Hebei
- Coordinates: 39°37′45″N 118°07′23″E
- Country: China
- Province: Hebei
- Prefecture-level city: Tangshan
- District: Lubei
- Village-level divisions: 6 communities, 28 villages

Area
  - Total: 40.00 km^{2} (15.44 sq mi)
- Elevation: 23 m (75 ft)

Population (2018)
  - Total: 64,714
  - Density: 1,618/km^{2} (4,190/sq mi)
- Time zone: UTC+8 (China Standard)
- Postal code: 063000
- Area code: 0315

Guoyuan (simplified Chinese: 果园镇; traditional Chinese: 果園鎮; pinyin: Guǒyuán Zhèn) is a town in Lubei District, Tangshan, Hebei, China. The town extends into the western outskirts of the city. As of 2021, it had 6 residential communities (Chinese: 社区) and 28 administrative villages (Chinese: 行政村) under its administration. Guoyuan was upgraded from a township to a town in 2021. Guoyuan spans an area of 40 square kilometres (15 mi^{2}), and had a hukou population of 64,714 as of 2018.

== History ==
In early 2021, Guoyuan was upgraded from a township to a town.

In November 2021, the Lubei District People's Government announced that the urban village (Chinese: 城中村; pinyin: chéng zhōng cūn) of Songxuexinzhuang (simplified Chinese: 宋学新庄; traditional Chinese: 宋學新莊; pinyin: Sòngxuéxīnzhuāng) would be redeveloped, and its inhabitants would be resettled.

== Administrative divisions ==
Guoyuan administers 6 residential communities (Chinese: 社区) and 28 administrative villages (Chinese: 行政村).

The town's 6 residential communities are as follows:

- Leitai Center Community (Chinese: 勒泰中心社区)
- Bihuyuan Community (Chinese: 碧湖园社区)
- Jun'anyuan First Community (Chinese: 骏安园第一社区)
- Jun'anyuan Second Community (Chinese: 骏安园第二社区)
- Rui'anyuan First Community (Chinese: 瑞安园第一社区)
- Rui'anyuan Second Community (Chinese: 瑞安园第二社区)

The town's 28 villages are as follows:

- Beiziyuan Village (Chinese: 碑子院村)
- Caojiakou Village (Chinese: 曹家口村)
- Dingjiatun Village (Chinese: 丁家屯村)
- Zhouguantun Village (Chinese: 周官屯村)
- Majiaya Village (Chinese: 马家涯村)
- Liuhuoxinzhuang Village (Chinese: 刘火新庄村)
- Majuqiao Village (Chinese: 马驹桥村)
- Guojiazhuang Village (Chinese: 郭家庄村)
- Bashenzhuang Village (Chinese: 八神庄村)
- Yuanjiazhuang Village (Chinese: 袁家庄村)
- Liguantun Village (Chinese: 李官屯村)
- Lijiazhuang Village (Chinese: 李家庄村)
- Xugezhai Village (Chinese: 许各寨村)
- Weijiazhuang Village (Chinese: 卫家庄村)
- Shouwangzhuang Village (Chinese: 寿王庄村)
- Biangezhai One Village (Chinese: 边各寨一村村)
- Biangezhai Two Village (Chinese: 边各寨二村村)
- Biangezhai Three Village (Chinese: 边各寨三村村)
- Biangezhai Four Village (Chinese: 边各寨四村村)
- Xiejiazhuang Village (Chinese: 谢家庄村)
- Changgezhuang Village (Chinese: 常各庄村)
- Laiwangzhuang Village (Chinese: 赖旺庄村)
- Songxuexinzhuang Village (Chinese: 宋学新庄村)
- Daguanzhuang Village (Chinese: 大官庄村)
- Wujiazhuang Village (Chinese: 吴家庄村)
- Zhenjiazhuang Village (Chinese: 甄家庄村)
- Niangniangmiao Village (Chinese: 娘娘庙村)
- Yangjiakou Village (Chinese: 杨家口村)

== See also ==
- List of township-level divisions of Hebei
- Lubei District
- Urban village (China)
