= Longdong =

Longdong may refer to:

- Longdong Stream Salamander, species native to Sichuan

The following entries are written as "龙洞" unless otherwise noted:

- Longdong, Hunan, town in Xiangxiang
- Longdong Township, Chongqing, in Yunyang County
- Longdong Township, Sichuan, in Cangxi County
- Longdong Subdistrict, Guangzhou, in Tianhe District
- Longdong Subdistrict, Tangshan (龙东街道), in Lubei District, Tangshan, Hebei
- Longdong Subdistrict, Jiaozuo, in Zhongzhan District, Jiaozuo, Henan
- Longdong Subdistrict, Jinan, in Lixia District, Jinan, Shandong
