= Dali Subdistrict =

Dali Subdistrict 大里街道
- Subdistrict
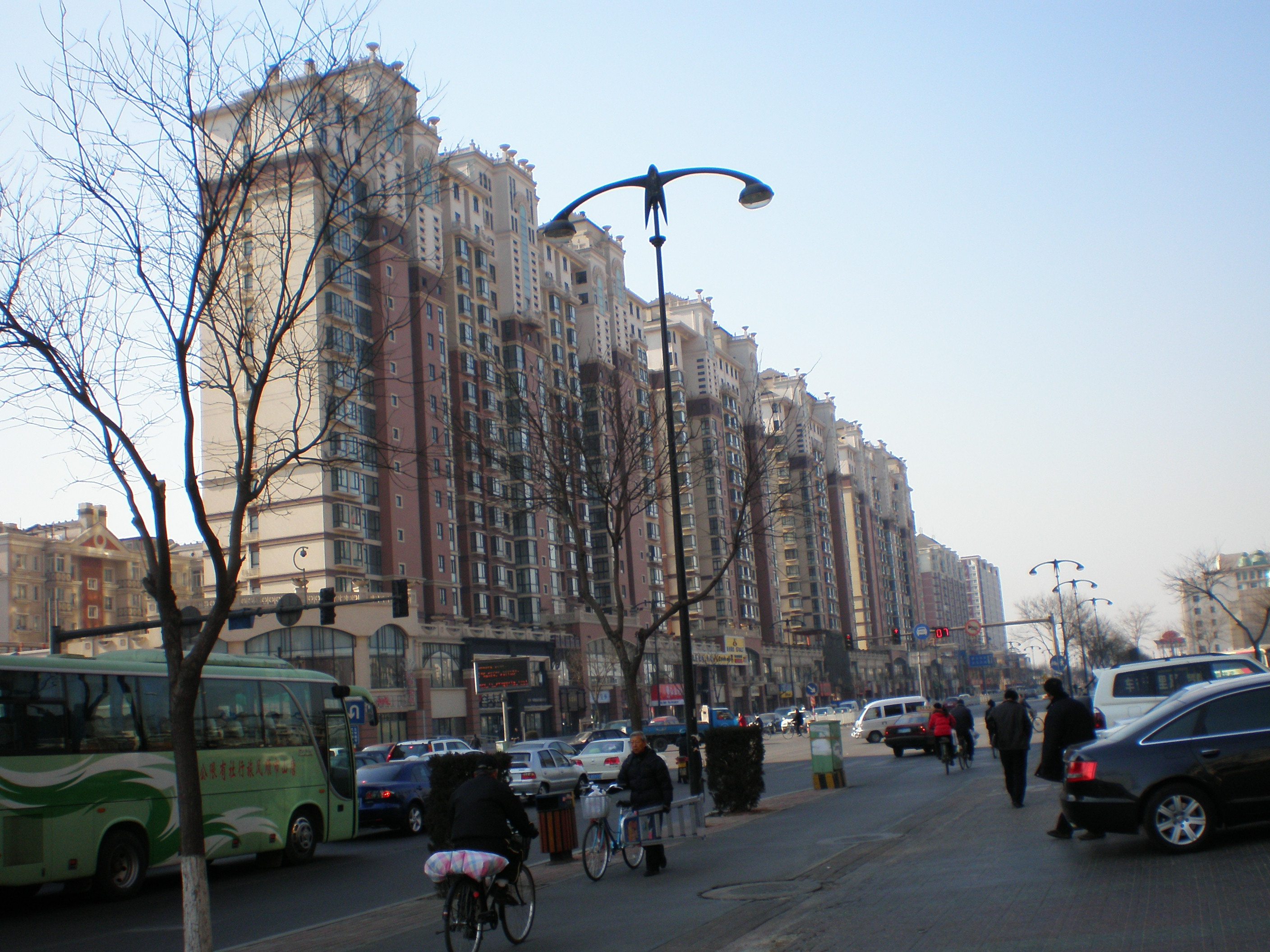
- Lijingqinyuan Community

- Location in Hebei
- Coordinates: 39°37′32″N 118°08′35″E
- Country: People's Republic of China
- Province: Hebei
- Prefecture-level city: Tangshan
- District: Lubei District
- Elevation: 23 m (75 ft)
- Time zone: UTC+8 (China Standard)
- Postal code: 063000
- Area code: 0315

Dali Subdistrict (Chinese: 大里街道; pinyin: Dàlǐ Jiēdào) is a subdistrict of Lubei District, in the heart of Tangshan, Hebei, People's Republic of China. As of 2020, it has 20 residential communities (社区) under its administration.

- Junxinli Community (军鑫里社区)
- Jun'anli Community (军安里社区)
- Dongdali Community (东大里社区)
- Huayulou Community (华育楼社区)
- Fenghuangyuan Community (凤凰园社区)
- Xingfuhuayuan Community (幸福花园社区)
- Jiankelou Community (建科楼社区)
- Changle Community (昌乐社区)
- Yin'anlou Community (银安楼社区)
- Qinyuanliyinhanglou Community (勤源里银行楼社区)
- Lijingqinyuan Community (丽景琴园社区)
- Jinsejiayuan Community (金色家园社区)
- Changchunyuan Community (畅春园社区)
- Shangzuohuayuan Community (尚座花园社区)
- Zhangdali Community (张大里社区)
- Zhangdalixincun Community (张大里新村社区)
- Xinglongzhuang Community (兴隆庄社区)
- Xinhuayuan Community (新华园社区)
- Maohuafu First Community (茂华府第一社区)
- Maohuafu Second Community (茂华府第二社区)

== See also ==
- List of township-level divisions of Hebei
