= Guangchang =

Guangchang may refer to the following locations in China:

- Guangchang County (广昌县), Fuzhou, Jiangxi
- Guangchang Subdistrict, Tangshan (广场街道), in Lunan District, Tangshan, Hebei
- Guangchang Subdistrict, Xiaogan (广场街道), in Xiaonan District, Xiaogan, Hubei
- Guangchang Subdistrict, Xiangtan (广场街道), in Yuhu District, Xiangtan, Hunan
