= Tangshan New Technology Development Zone =

Tangshan New Technology Development Zone 唐山高新技术产业开发区
- Subdistrict

Chinese transcription(s)
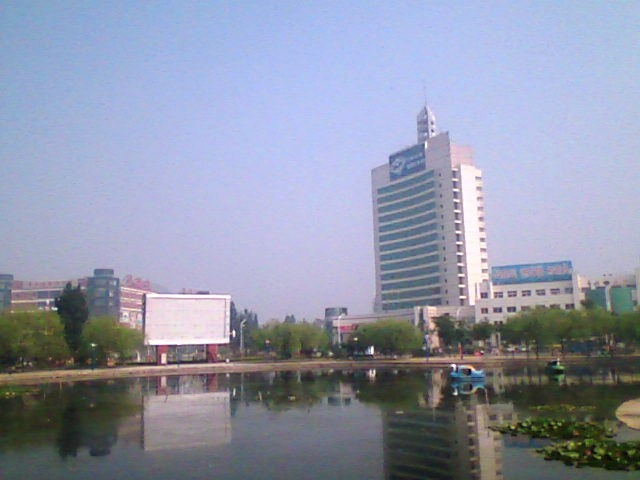
- Country: China
- Province: Hebei
- Prefecture: Tangshan
- Time zone: UTC+8 (China Standard Time)

Tangshan New Technology Development Zone (Chinese: 唐山高新技术产业开发区) is a township-level division of Lubei District, Tangshan, Hebei, China.

== See also ==
- List of township-level divisions of Hebei
