= Hebei Road Subdistrict =

Hebei Road Subdistrict 河北路街道
- Subdistrict
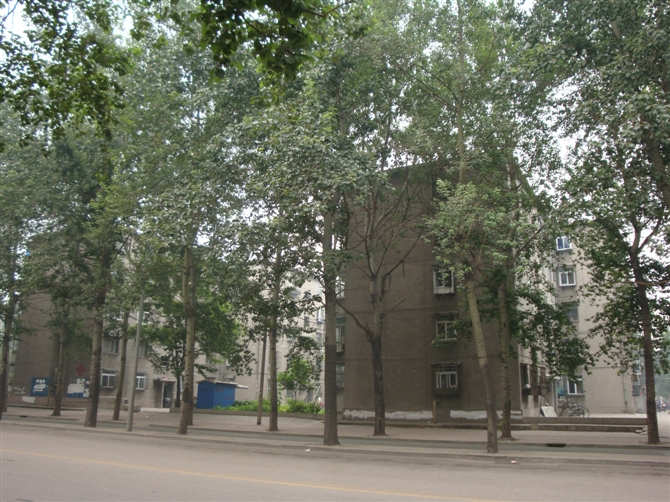

- Location in Hebei
- Coordinates: 39°41′24″N 118°11′54″E
- Country: People's Republic of China
- Province: Hebei
- Prefecture-level city: Tangshan
- District: Lubei
- Village-level divisions: 7 residential communities
- Elevation: 23 m (75 ft)
- Time zone: UTC+8 (China Standard)
- Postal code: 063020
- Area code: 0315

Hebei Road Subdistrict (Chinese: 河北路街道; pinyin: Héběi Lù Jiēdào) is a subdistrict and the seat of Lubei District, in the north of Tangshan, Hebei, People's Republic of China. As of 2011, it has 7 residential communities (社区) under its administration.

== See also ==
- List of township-level divisions of Hebei
