= Xiaoshan (disambiguation) =

Xiaoshan may refer to the following locations in China:

- Xiaoshan District (萧山区), Hangzhou
  - Hangzhou Xiaoshan International Airport (杭州萧山国际机场)
- Xiaoshan Subdistrict (小山街道), Lunan District, Tangshan, Hebei
- Xiaoshan Township, Tiandeng County (小山乡), Guangxi
- Xiaoshan Township, Haixing County (小山乡), Hebei
- Xiao Mountain (崤山), range in the west of Henan
