= Diaoyutai Subdistrict, Tangshan =

Diaoyutai Subdistrict 钓鱼台街道
- Subdistrict
- Location in Hebei
- Coordinates: 39°39′14″N 118°11′13″E
- Country: People's Republic of China
- Province: Hebei
- Prefecture-level city: Tangshan
- District: Lubei
- Village-level divisions: 14 residential communities
- Elevation: 20 m (66 ft)
- Time zone: UTC+8 (China Standard)
- Postal code: 063000
- Area code: 0315

Diaoyutai Subdistrict (simplified Chinese: 钓鱼台街道; traditional Chinese: 釣魚台街道; pinyin: Diàoyútái Jiēdào) is a subdistrict of Lubei District, in the heart of Tangshan, Hebei, People's Republic of China. As of 2011, it has 14 residential communities (社区) under its administration.

== See also ==
- List of township-level divisions of Hebei
