= Daodi =

Daodi 稻地镇
- Town
- Dàodì Zhèn
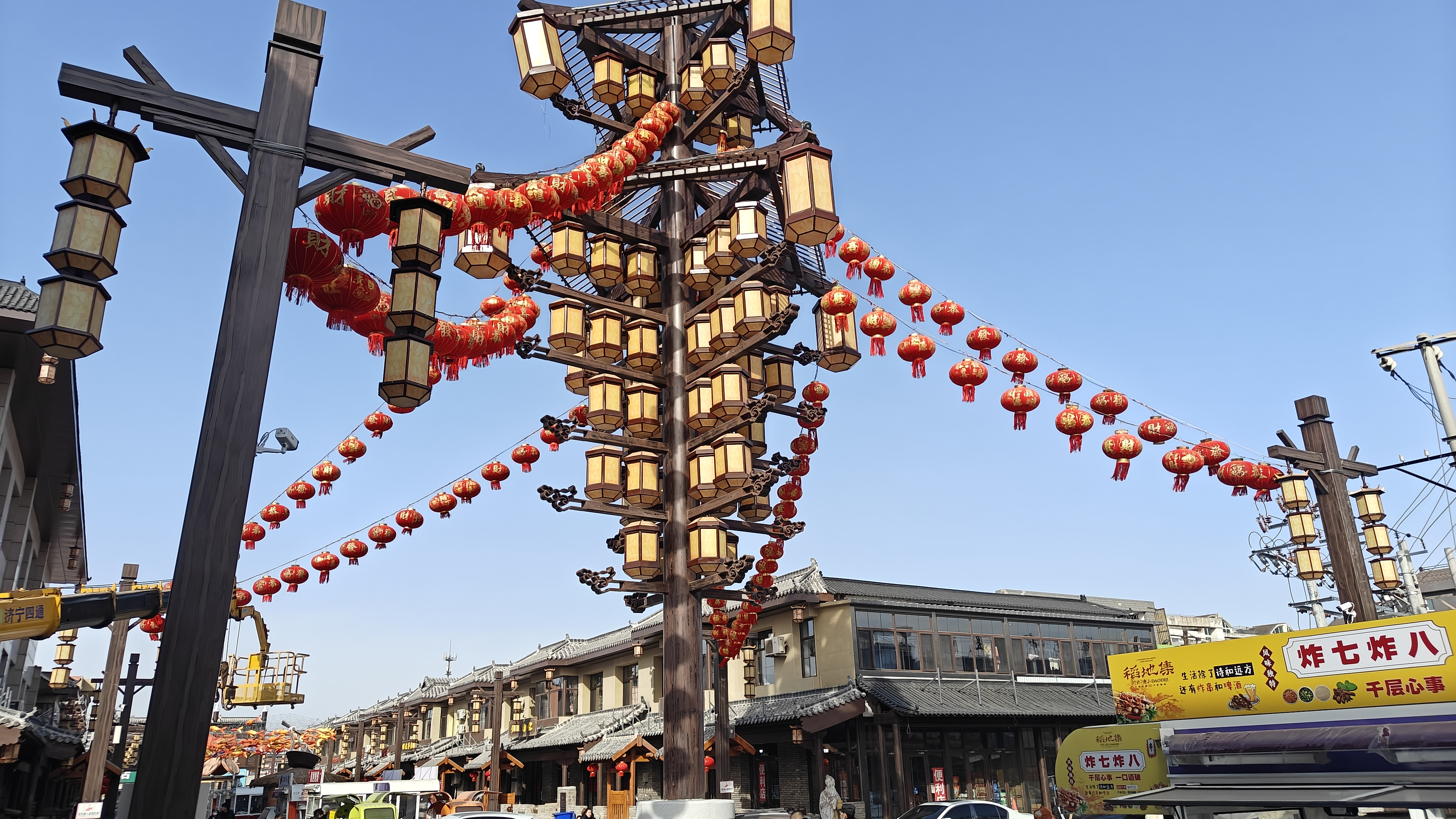
- Daodi market

- Location in Hebei Location in China
- Coordinates: 39°32′24″N 118°11′22″E
- Country: People's Republic of China
- Province: Hebei
- Prefecture-level city: Tangshan
- District: Lunan

Area
  - Total: 49.73 km^{2} (19.20 sq mi)

Population (2010)
  - Total: 32,921
  - Density: 662/km^{2} (1,710/sq mi)
- Time zone: UTC+8 (China Standard)

Daodi (Chinese: 稻地镇; pinyin: Dàodì Zhèn) is a town located in Lunan District, Tangshan, Hebei, China. According to the 2010 census, Daodi had a population of 32,921, including 16,695 males and 16,226 females. The population was distributed as follows: 3,957 people aged under 14, 26,078 people aged between 15 and 64, and 2,886 people aged over 65.

== See also ==
- List of township-level divisions of Hebei
