= Wenbei Subdistrict =

Coordinates: 39.61905°N 118.20795°E

Wenbei Subdistrict 文北街道
- Subdistrict

Chinese transcription(s)
- Interactive map of Wenbei Subdistrict
- Country: China
- Province: Hebei
- Prefecture: Tangshan
- Time zone: UTC+8 (China Standard Time)

Wenbei Subdistrict (Chinese: 文北街道) is a township-level division of Lunan District, Tangshan, Hebei, China.

== See also ==
- List of township-level divisions of Hebei
