= Longdong Subdistrict, Tangshan =

Longdong Subdistrict 龙东街道
- Subdistrict
- Location in Hebei
- Coordinates: 39°40′22″N 118°11′42″E
- Country: People's Republic of China
- Province: Hebei
- Prefecture-level city: Tangshan
- District: Lubei
- Village-level divisions: 11 residential communities
- Elevation: 22 m (72 ft)
- Time zone: UTC+8 (China Standard)
- Postal code: 063020
- Area code: 0315

Longdong Subdistrict (simplified Chinese: 龙东街道; traditional Chinese: 龍東街道; pinyin: Lóngdōng Jiēdào) is a subdistrict of Lubei District, in the north of Tangshan, Hebei, People's Republic of China. As of 2011, it has 11 residential communities (社区) under its administration.

== See also ==
- List of township-level divisions of Hebei
