= Wenhua Road Subdistrict, Tangshan =

Coordinates: 39.64497°N 118.1657°E

Wenhua Road Subdistrict, Tangshan 文化路街道
- Subdistrict

Chinese transcription(s)
- Interactive map of Wenhua Road Subdistrict, Tangshan
- Country: China
- Province: Hebei
- Prefecture: Tangshan
- Time zone: UTC+8 (China Standard Time)

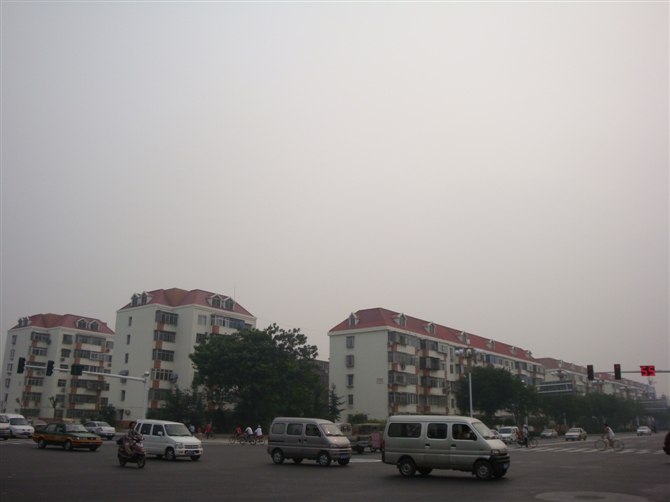
Northeast Fuqiang Building, Weiguo Intersection

Wenhua Road Subdistrict, Tangshan (Chinese: 文化路街道) is a township-level division of Lubei District, Tangshan, Hebei, China.

== See also ==
- List of township-level divisions of Hebei
