= South Xueyuan Road Subdistrict =

Coordinates: 39°37′18″N 118°08′49″E

South Xueyuan Road Subdistrict 学院南路街道
- Subdistrict

Chinese transcription(s)
- Interactive map of South Xueyuan Road Subdistrict
- Country: China
- Province: Hebei
- Prefecture: Tangshan
- Time zone: UTC+8 (China Standard Time)

South Xueyuan Road Subdistrict (Chinese: 学院南路街道, literally 'South College Road Subdistrict') is a township-level division of Lunan District, Tangshan, Hebei, China.

== See also ==
- List of township-level divisions of Hebei
