= Lubei, Tangshan =

Lubei 路北区
- District
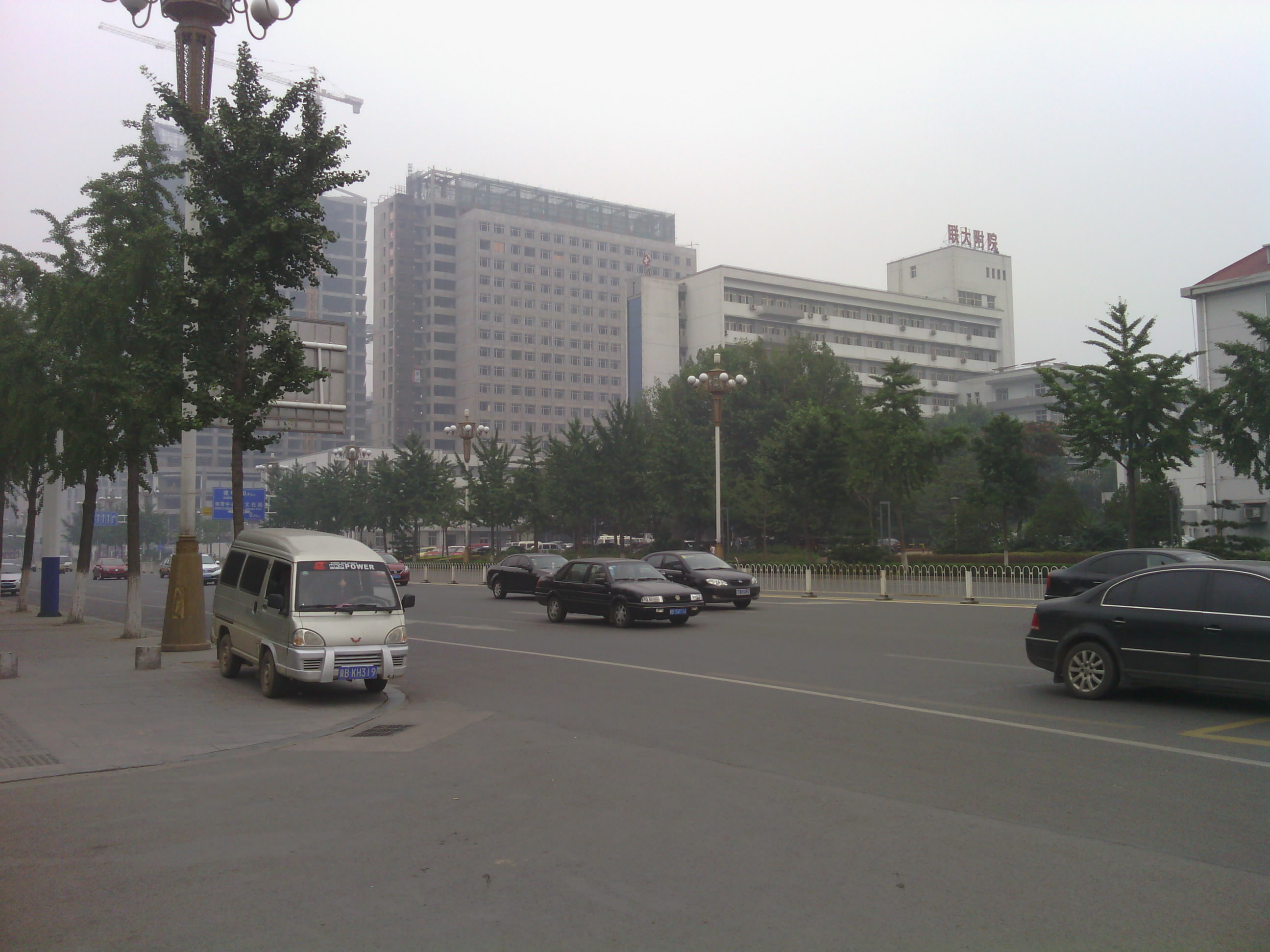

- Location in Hebei
- Coordinates: 39°37′26″N 118°12′04″E
- Country: China
- Province: Hebei
- Prefecture-level city: Tangshan
- District seat: Qiaotun Subdistrict

Area
  - Total: 123.95 km^{2} (47.86 sq mi)

Population (2020 census)
  - Total: 784,667
  - Density: 6,330.5/km^{2} (16,396/sq mi)
- Time zone: UTC+8 (China Standard)
- Website: www.tslb.gov.cn

Lubei District (simplified Chinese: 路北区; traditional Chinese: 路北區; pinyin: Lùběi Qū; lit. 'North of the road') is a district of the city of Tangshan, Hebei, China. The district's population totaled 743,504 as of 2010.

== History ==
Lubei District was first established in 1955, but was merged into Lunan District and the now-defunct Gangyao District the following year. Lubei District was re-established in 1963.

In July 2013, the town of Hancheng was transferred from Fengrun District to Lubei District.

In February 2021, the Hebei Provincial Government upgraded Guoyuan from a township to a town, reflecting the area's increased urbanization.

== Administrative divisions ==
Lubei District administers 11 subdistricts and 2 towns.

The district's 11 subdistricts are Qiaotun Subdistrict (乔屯街道), Wenhua Road Subdistrict (文化路街道), Diaoyutai Subdistrict (钓鱼台街道), Dongxincun Subdistrict (东新村街道), Gangyao Subdistrict (缸窑街道), Jichang Road Subdistrict (机场路街道), Hebei Road Subdistrict (河北路街道), Longdong Subdistrict (龙东街道), Dali Subdistrict (大里街道), Guangming Subdistrict (光明街道), and Xiangyundao Subdistrict (翔云道街道).

The district's 2 towns are Hancheng (韩城镇) and Guoyuan (果园镇).

== Demographics ==
In recent decades, the population of Lubei District has steadily increased. The 2010 Chinese Census reported the district's population to be 743,504, up significantly from the 567,476 reported in the 2000 Chinese Census. A 1996 estimate put the district's population at about 472,000.

== Economy ==
Tangsteel Group is headquartered in Lubei District. The district is home to the Tangshan New Technology Development Zone (唐山市高新技术开发区).

== Culture ==
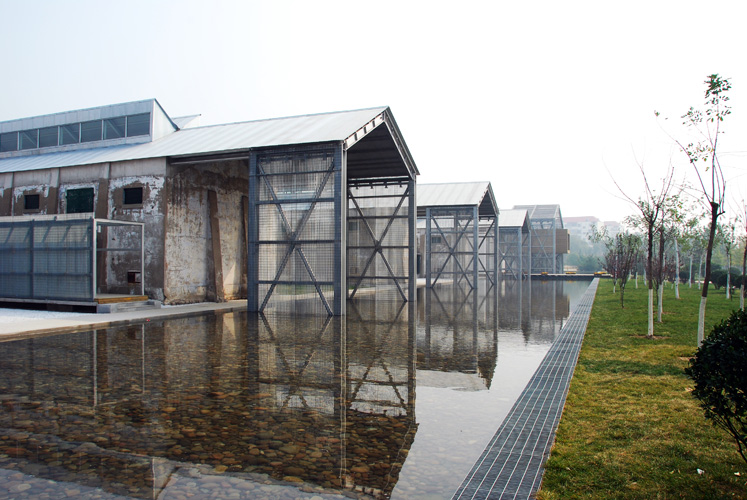
An exhibition hall at the China Tangshan Industrial Museum

The China Tangshan Industrial Museum, a museum commemorating Tangshan's industrial history, is located in Lubei District.
