= Yonghongqiao Subdistrict =

Coordinates: 39°36′44″N 118°11′09″E

Yonghongqiao Subdistrict 永红桥街道
- Subdistrict

Chinese transcription(s)
- Interactive map of Yonghongqiao Subdistrict
- Country: China
- Province: Hebei
- Prefecture: Tangshan
- Time zone: UTC+8 (China Standard Time)

Yonghongqiao Subdistrict (Chinese: 永红桥街道) is a township-level division of Lunan District, Tangshan, Hebei, China.

== See also ==
- List of township-level divisions of Hebei
