= Guangchang Subdistrict, Tangshan =

Guangchang Subdistrict 广场街道
- Subdistrict
- Location in Hebei
- Coordinates: 39°37′11″N 118°09′42″E
- Country: People's Republic of China
- Province: Hebei
- Prefecture-level city: Tangshan
- District: Lunan
- Village-level divisions: 12 residential communities
- Elevation: 37 m (121 ft)
- Time zone: UTC+8 (China Standard)
- Postal code: 063000
- Area code: 0315

Guangchang Subdistrict (simplified Chinese: 广场街道; traditional Chinese: 廣場街道; pinyin: Guǎngchǎng Jiēdào) is a subdistrict of Lunan District, in the heart of Tangshan, Hebei, People's Republic of China. As of 2011, it has 12 residential communities (居委会) under its administration.

== See also ==
- List of township-level divisions of Hebei
