= Qiaotun Subdistrict =

Coordinates: 39.62542°N 118.19894°E

Qiaotun Subdistrict 乔屯街道
- Subdistrict

Chinese transcription(s)
- Interactive map of Qiaotun Subdistrict
- Country: China
- Province: Hebei
- Prefecture: Tangshan
- Time zone: UTC+8 (China Standard Time)

Qiaotun Subdistrict (Chinese: 乔屯街道) is a township-level division of Lubei District, Tangshan, Hebei, China.

== See also ==
- List of township-level divisions of Hebei
