= Dacheng Ren =

American scientist

- Citizenship: American
- Education: Cornell University; University of Connecticut; Tianjin University; Shanghai Jiao Tong
- Known for: Biofilms; Persister cells surface science Antimicrobials
- Awards: AIMBE Fellow (2022)
- Scientific career
- Fields: Biotechnology
- Workplaces: Syracuse University
- Thesis: Inhibition of bacterial multicellular behavior by natural brominated furanones (2003)
- Doctoral advisor: Thomas K Wood
- Other academic advisors: Kelvin H. Lee
- Website: renlab.syr.edu

Dacheng Ren is the Stevenson-endowed professor in the Department of Biomedical and Chemical Engineering at Syracuse University. He also serves as the director for the Syracuse Biomaterials Institute. Ren is known for research on biofilm growth and work on inhibition of bacterial growth on medical devices.

== Biography ==
Ren earned his B.E. in applied chemistry and electrical engineering from the Shanghai Jiao Tong University in 1996. He earned his Master of Engineering in chemical engineering from Tianjin University, China in 1999. Ren came to the United States in 1999 as a graduate student at University of Connecticut, where he worked under Thomas K Wood. His 2003 PhD thesis was titled "Inhibition of bacterial multicellular behavior by natural brominated furanones". He was a postdoctoral associate, working with Kelvin H. Lee, in the chemical engineering department at Cornell University from 2003 until 2005.

After his finishing his post-doctoral appointment at Cornell in 2006, Ren began his career as professor of at Syracuse University. He was awarded tenure in May 2011 and became a full professor in May 2016. Ren has published over 100 papers and books on biofilm related topics and holds 11 U.S. patents.

Ren serves on the editorial board of Elsevier's Biofilm journals.

In July 2009, Ren received an Early Career Translational Research Award in Biomedical Engineering from the Wallace H. Coulter Foundation. In 2010, he was named the College Technology Educator of the Year by the Technology Alliance of Central New York . In 2011, he received the NSF-CAREER award.

In 2022, he was elected as Fellow at the American Institute for Medical and Biological Engineering.
