= Anti-Seismic Monument =

Coordinates: 39°36′12″N 116°23′30″E

- Simplified Chinese: 唐山抗震纪念碑
- Traditional Chinese: 唐山抗震紀念碑
Transcriptions
Standard Mandarin
- Hanyu Pinyin: Tangshan Kangzhen Jinianbei

The Anti-Seismic Monument or Tangshan Earthquake Monument is located in the eastern part of the center square in Tangshan City, and the Tangshan Earthquake Memorial Hall museum is on the western part of the square. In order to always remember July 28, 1976, Tangshan, Fengnan, a strong earthquake of magnitude 7.8 occurred in the area of this huge natural disaster, to commemorate the people of Tangshan earthquake relief, reconstruction of the glorious achievements of the people of Tangshan, in memory of compatriots killed in the earthquake and to save people's lives and property and sacrificed martyrs, the Tangshan Municipal People's Government has decided to establish a monument square. The square began construction in June 1985. On the eve of the 10th anniversary of the earthquake in July 1986, the square was completed.

== Description ==
The Monument Square measures 320 m long from east to west and 170 m wide from south to north, covering an area of 5.4 hectares. It is a monument to the city's dauntless spirit.

The Anti-Seismic Monument is composed of main monument and a secondary monument. The main monument tells the heroic stories of earthquake relief. The secondary monument describes the history of the Tangshan earthquake in the form of ruins. The monument's pedestal is 3 m high and the body is 30 m high.

The body is composed by four trapezoidal pillars. The pillars symbolize the buildings which collapsed during the earthquake and the new architecture which soars above the horizon. The top of the pillars resembles four huge hands reaching the sky and symbolizing that "Mankind Can Conquer Nature." The four sides of monument's body include eight engravings which symbolize the support Tangshan received from other parts of China. The monument body is reinforced concrete, and the surface is granite. In the center is a frontispiece with the words "Tangshan Earthquake Monument," written by Hu Yaobang.
