= Dacheng Hill =

Hill in central Tangshan, China

- Interactive map of Dacheng Hill
- Type: Urban park
- Location: Tangshan, China
- Coordinates: 39°36′2″N 118°10′26″E
- Area: 1.18 km^{2} (0.46 sq mi)

Dacheng Hill (Chinese: 大城山; pinyin: Dàchéngshān; lit. 'Big City Hill') is a hill in central Tangshan, Hebei. Covering an area of more than 1,180,000 m^{2}, Dacheng HIll is north of the Phoenix Peak. Dacheng Hill was previously called Tangshan Hill.
