= Lunan, Tangshan =

Lunan 路南区
- District
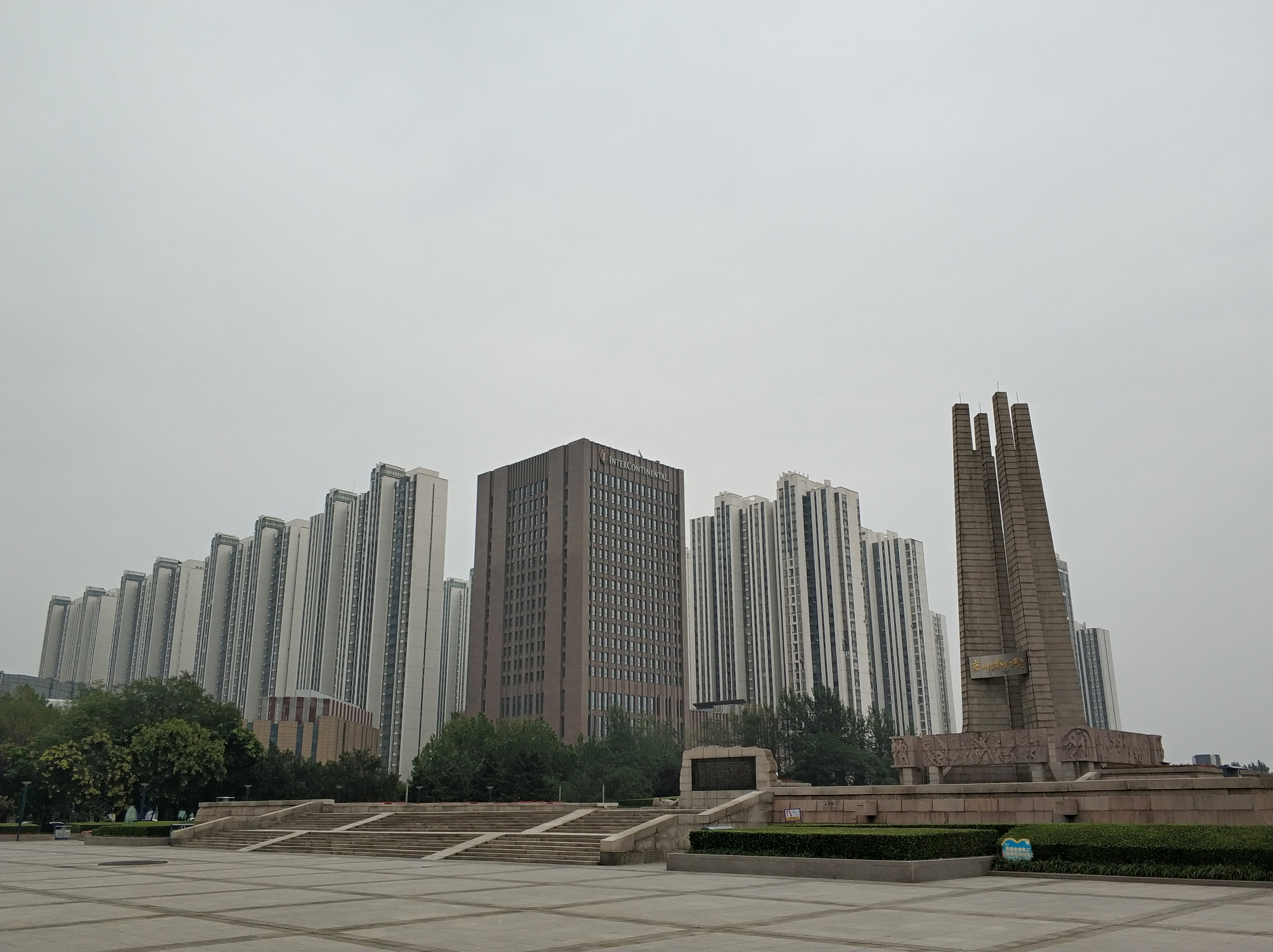
- A view of the Tangshan Earthquake Monument Square

- Location of Lunan District in Hebei
- Country: People's Republic of China
- Province: Hebei
- Prefecture-level city: Tangshan

Area
  - District: 110.92 km^{2} (42.83 sq mi)

Population (2020)
  - District: 430,312
  - Density: 3,879.5/km^{2} (10,048/sq mi)
  - Urban: 374,912
- Time zone: UTC+8 (China Standard)

Lunan District (simplified Chinese: 路南区; traditional Chinese: 路南區; pinyin: Lùnán Qū; lit. 'South of the Road') is a district of the city of Tangshan, Hebei province, China. The district spans an area of 110.92 square kilometres (42.83 mi^{2}), and has a population of 430,312 per the 2020 government census.

== Toponymy ==
Lunan District derives its name from its location to the south of the Beijing–Shanhaiguan railway.

== History ==
Much of Tangshan's early industry was concentrated in the area, especially in present-day Xiaoshan Subdistrict. According to the Lunan District government, the area of the present-day district was the site of China's first mechanized mine, first standard gauge railway, first steam locomotive, and mainland China's first university professor.

Lunan District was established in 1952.

== Geography ==
The Dou River and the Qinglong river (Chinese: 青龙河) both flow through the district.

== Administrative divisions ==
Lunan District administers nine subdistricts, one town, and one township.

=== Subdistricts ===
The district's nine subdistricts are South Xueyuan Road Subdistrict (学院南路街道), Youyi Subdistrict (友谊街道), Guangchang Subdistrict (广场街道), Yonghongqiao Subdistrict (永红桥街道), Xiaoshan Subdistrict (小山街道), Wenhuabeihou Street Subdistrict (文化北后街街道), Qianjiaying Mining Area Subdistrict (钱家营矿区街道), Huimindao Subdistrict (惠民道街道), and Liangjiatun Road Subdistrict (梁家屯路街道).

=== Towns ===
The district's sole town is Daodi (稻地镇).

=== Townships ===
The district's sole township is Nüzhizhai Township (女织寨乡).
