= Tangshan =

Tangshan 唐山市
- Prefecture-level city
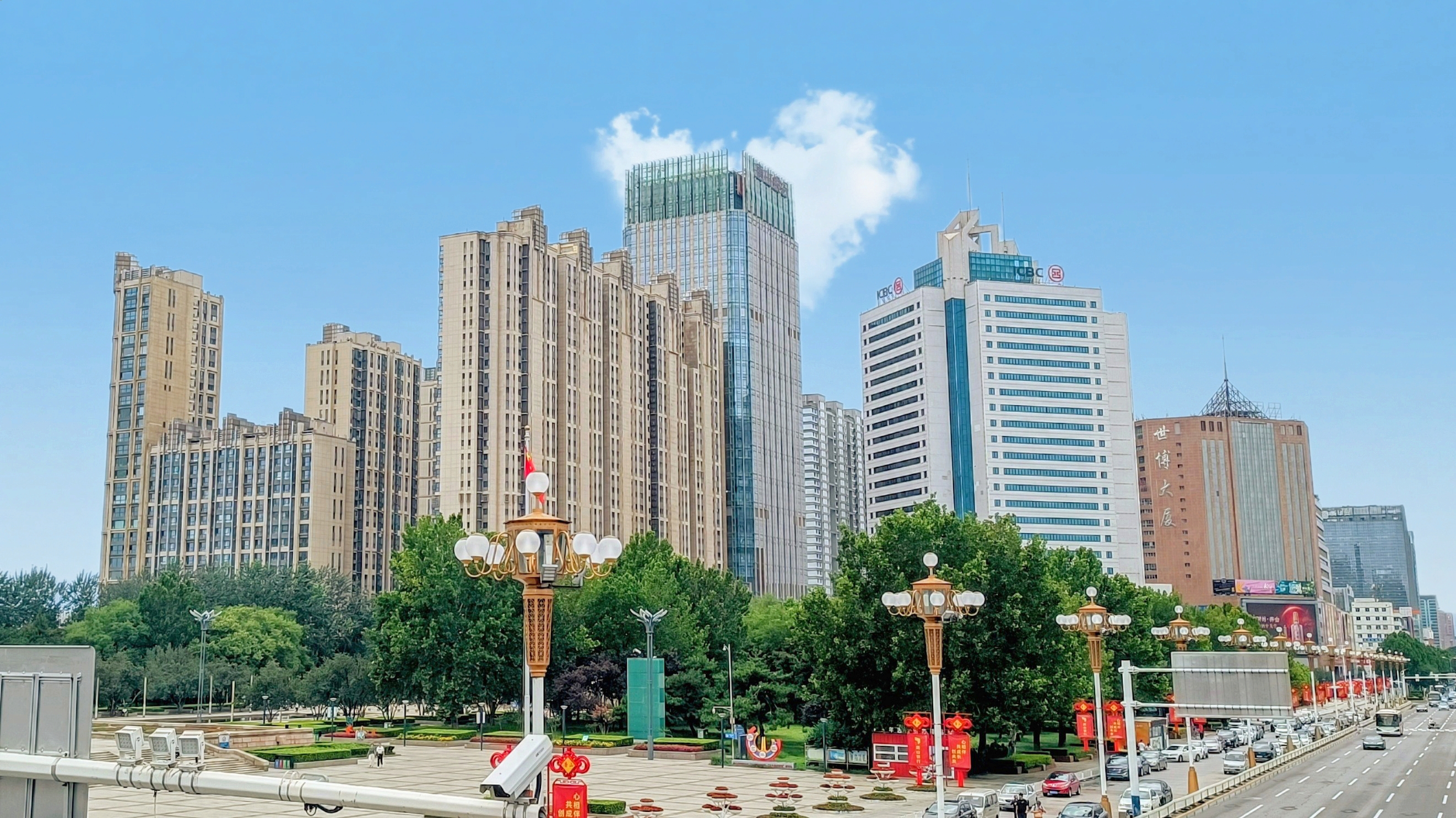
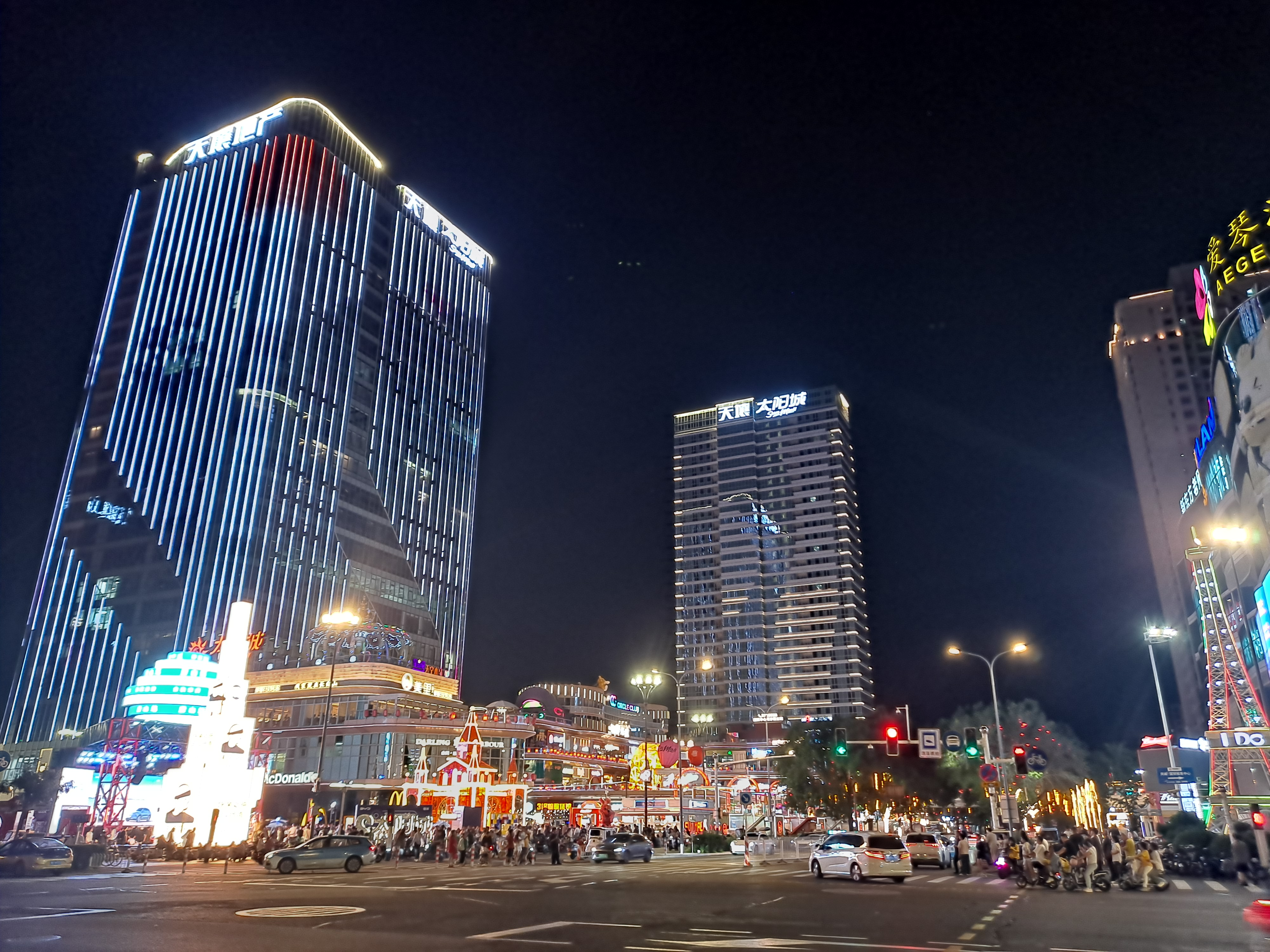
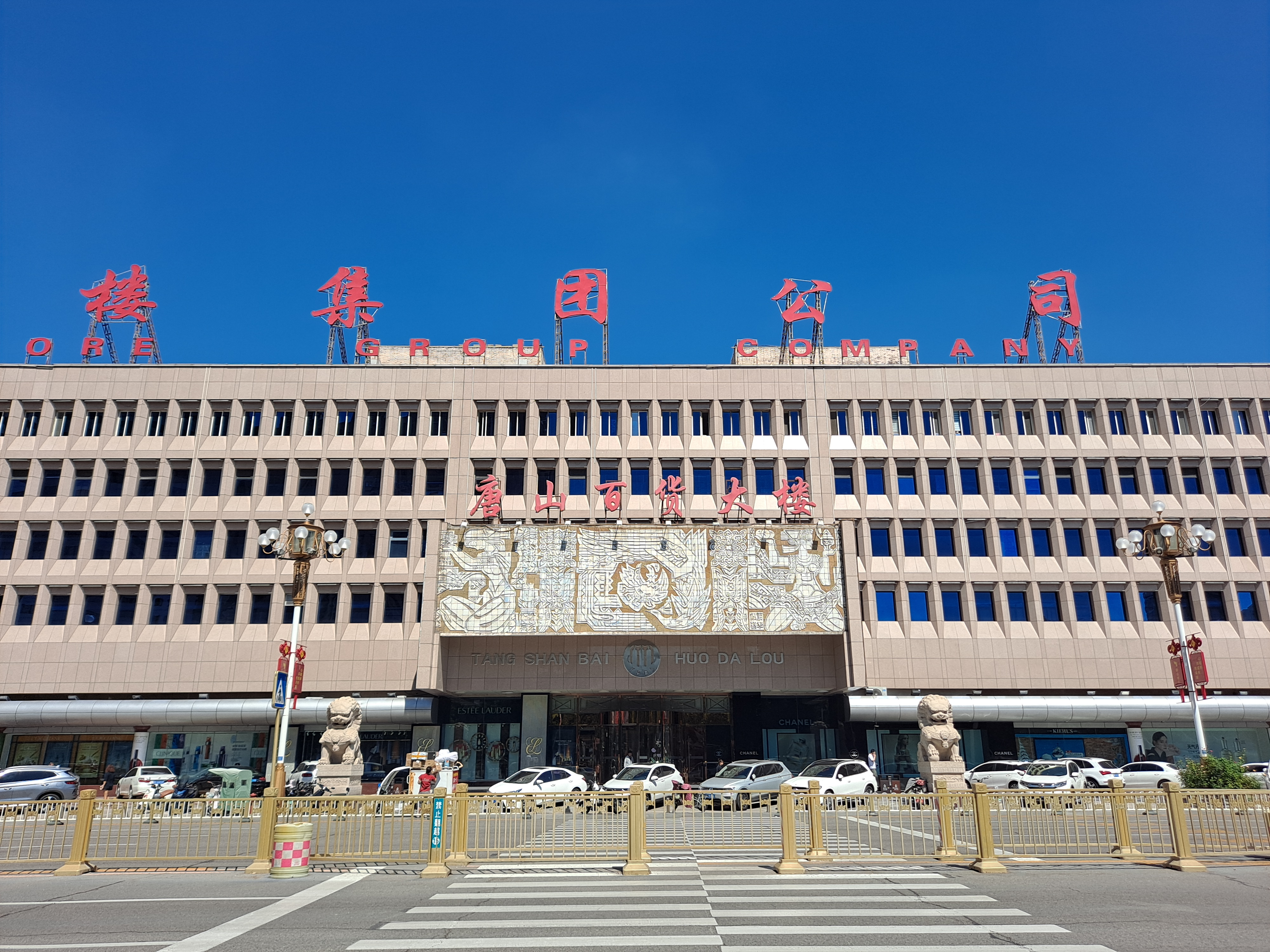
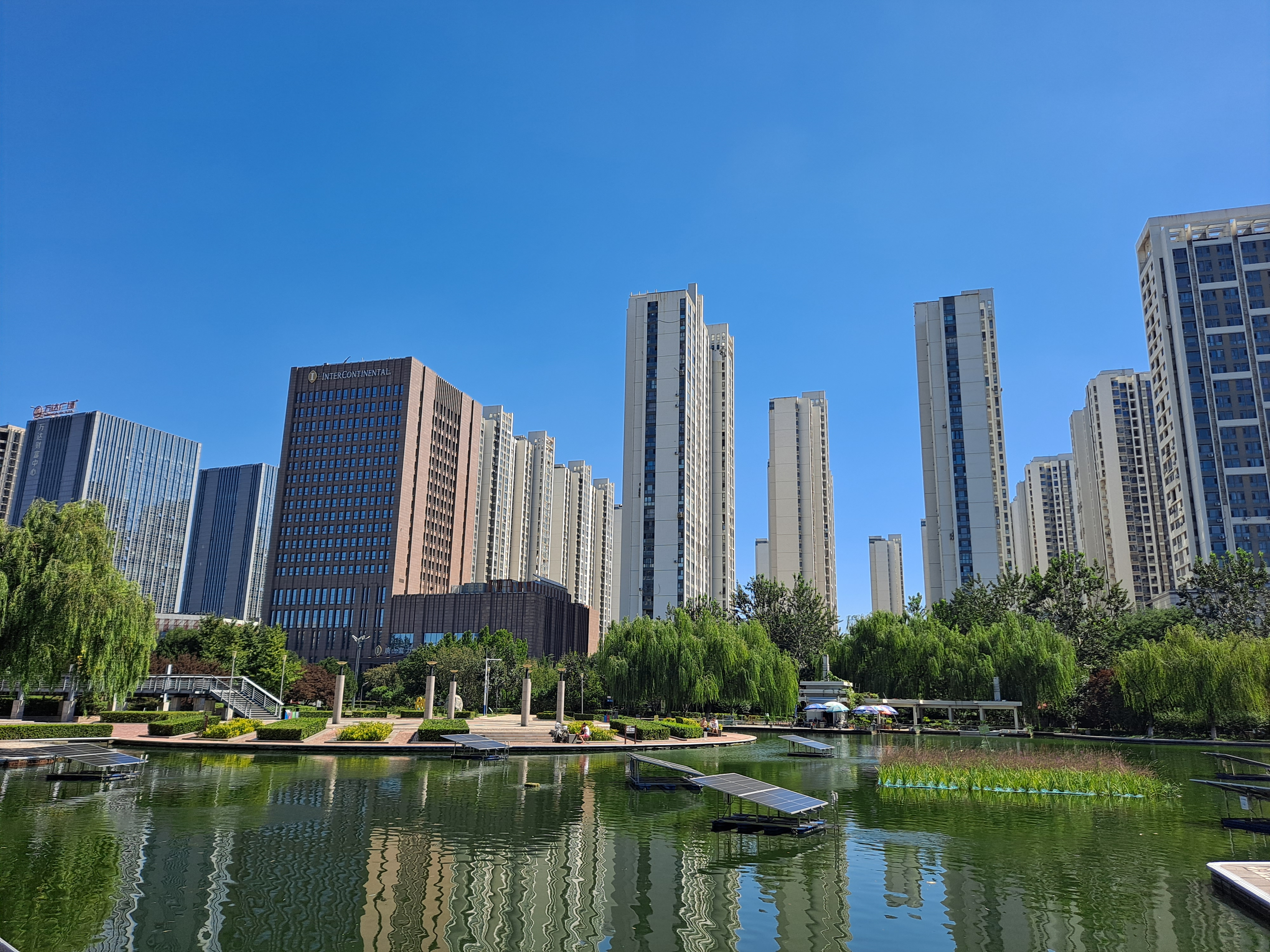
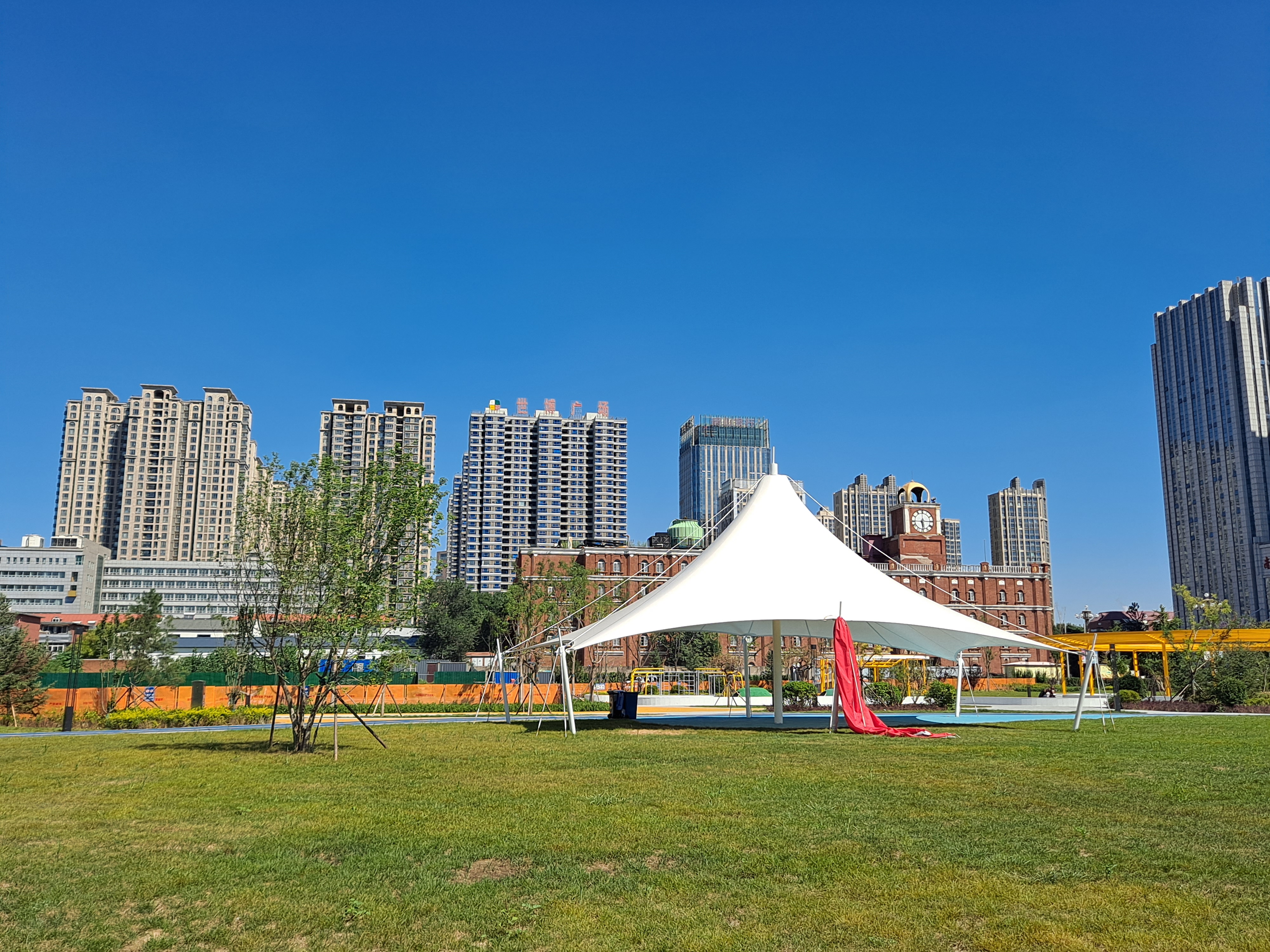
- Tangshan skyline Sun Mall commercial complex Tangshan Department Store Dazhao Park Xiaonan Park (urban green space)
- Nickname: Phoenix City (凤凰城)
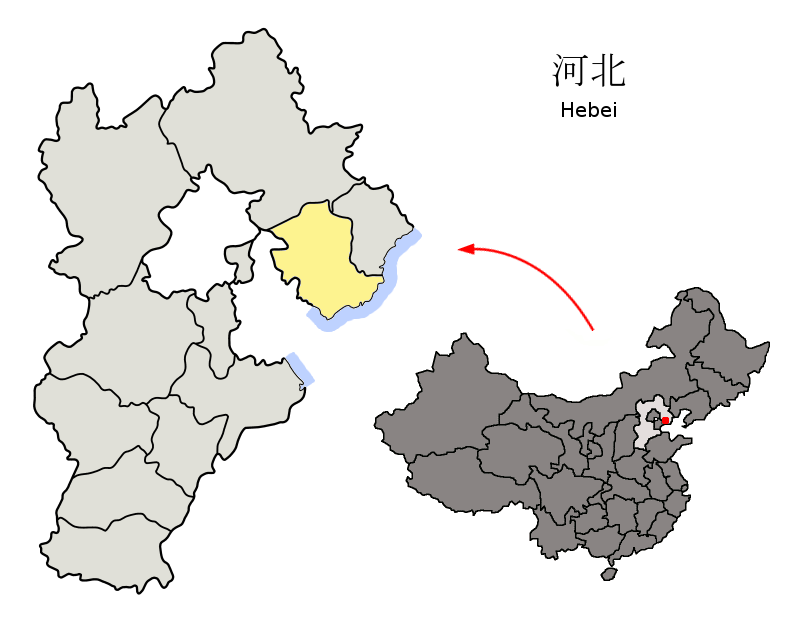
- Location of Tangshan City jurisdiction in Hebei

- Location of the city centre in Hebei Tangshan (Northern China) Tangshan (China)
- Coordinates (Tangshan government): 39°37′46″N 118°10′26″E
- Country: People's Republic of China
- Province: Hebei
- Established: January 28, 1938
- Municipal seat: Lubei District

Government
  - Party Secretary: Chang Bin (常斌)
  - Mayor: Tian Guoliang (田国良)

Area
  - Prefecture-level city: 13,472 km^{2} (5,202 sq mi)
  - Metro: 3,874 km^{2} (1,496 sq mi)

Population (2020 census)
  - Prefecture-level city: 7,717,983
  - Density: 572.89/km^{2} (1,483.8/sq mi)
  - Urban: 4,963,907
  - Metro: 3,687,607
  - Metro density: 951.9/km^{2} (2,465/sq mi)

GDP
  - Prefecture-level city: CN¥ 891 billion US$ 100 billion
  - Per capita: CN¥ 86,667; US$ 12,563
- Time zone: UTC+8 (China Standard)
- Postal code: 063000
- Area code: 315
- ISO 3166 code: CN-HE-02
- License Plate Prefix: 冀B
- Website: tangshan.gov.cn

Tangshan
- Chinese: 唐山
- Literal meaning: "Mountain of Tang" (Dacheng Hill)
Transcriptions
Standard Mandarin
- Hanyu Pinyin: Tángshān
- Wade–Giles: T'ang^{2}-shan^{1}
- IPA: [tʰǎŋ.ʂán]
Yue: Cantonese
- Yale Romanization: Tòhng-sāan
- Jyutping: Tong^{4}-saan^{1}
- IPA: [tʰɔŋ˩.san˥]

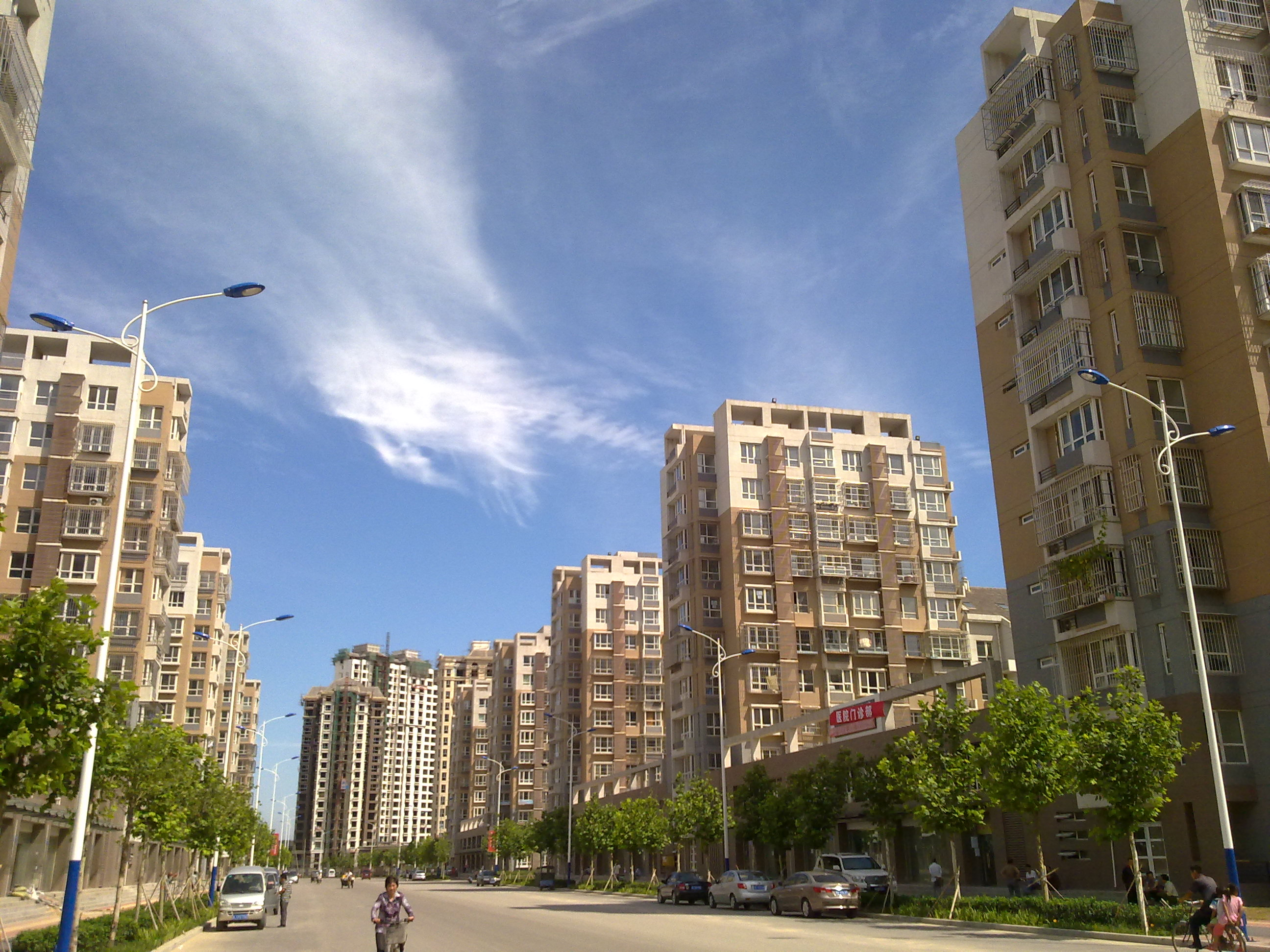
Huimin Yuan Apartments, Zhengtai Li, in Lunan District

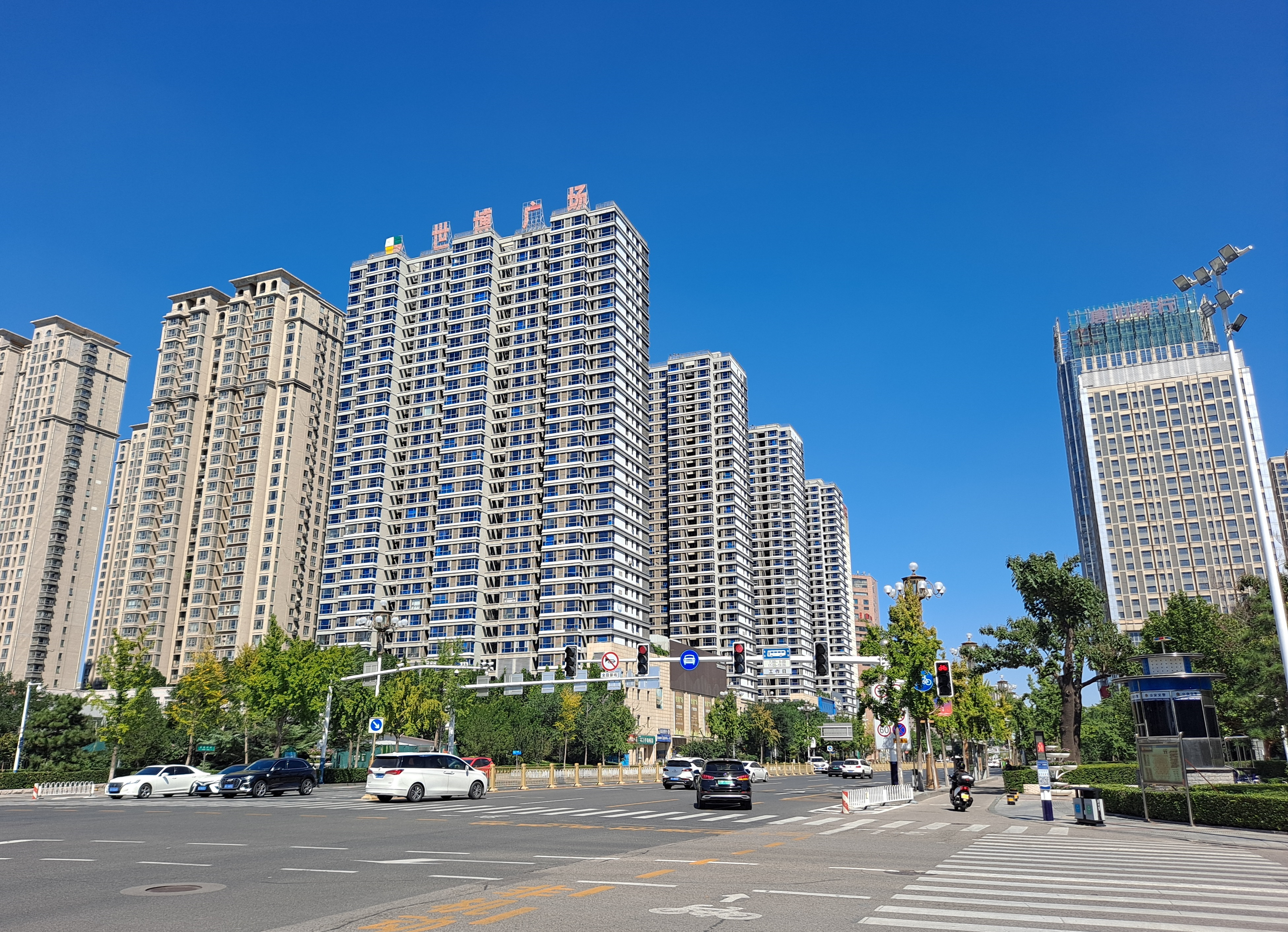
Jianshe South Road in Tangshan

Tangshan (Chinese: 唐山; pinyin: Tángshān) is a coastal, industrial prefecture-level city in the northeast of Hebei province. It is located in the eastern part of Hebei Province and the northeastern part of the North China Plain. It is located in the central area of the Bohai Rim and serves as the main traffic corridor to the Northeast. The city faces the Bohai Sea in the south, the Yan Mountains in the north, Qinhuangdao across the Luan River to the east, and Tianjin to the west.

Much of the city's development is thanks to the industrialization, beginning in 1870, when Kailuan Group established coal mines in the region. It is the birthplace of China's first standard-gauge railway, the first railway plant, the first steam locomotive, and the first cement factory. It was hailed as China's "cradle of industrialization". Even today, Tangshan is a hub of steel, energy, chemical, and ceramics production. Ping opera, which originated from the city's Luanzhou county, is one of the five most popular Chinese operas.

The city has also become known for an earthquake in 1976 which measured 7.8 on the Richter scale. It flattened much of the city and killed at least 255,000 residents according to official estimates. The city has since been rebuilt, has become a tourist attraction, and is among the 10 largest ports in China.

The city of Tangshan is approximately 149 km (93 mi) east by southeast of Beijing and 110 km (68 mi) northeast of Tianjin. Tangshan's prefecture population was 7,717,983 at the 2020 census, with 3,687,607 in the built-up (or metro) area made of the 7 urban core districts. At the end of 2024, the city's resident population was 7,722,800, an increase of 3,300 over the end of the previous year, including 5,182 million urban population.

== Etymology ==
Tangshan is named after Dacheng Hill (大城山), which was formerly called Mount Tang (唐山) and is located in the middle of the city.

In A.D. 645, Li Shimin, an emperor of Tang dynasty, with his army, was stationed at Dacheng Hill on his way back from the Korean Peninsula. Unfortunately, Caofei, his beloved concubine, died there. In order to commemorate her, he named the mountain after the name of the empire, Tang. Later, the city took the name of the mountain.

== History ==
=== Early history ===
Tangshan has a long history, with ancient humans living in the area as early as 4,000 years ago. It fell within the territory of the Guzhu Kingdom (1600 BC) at the time of the Shang dynasty and later became a part of the State of Yan, one of the seven Warring States (403 – 221 BC). During the Han dynasty (206 BC – 220 AD) it became part of the ancient province of Youzhou. It was under the jurisdiction of Zhili province and Zunhua State successively during the Qing dynasty.

=== Tang, Ming and Qing dynasties ===
Tangshan was a village at the time of the Tang dynasty (619–907) and developed further in agriculture, oil exploitation and ceramics during the Ming dynasty (1368–1644).

During the Hundred Days' Reform in the late Qing dynasty, the Kaiping Mining Administration was established in the third year of the Guangxu Emperor (1877). In 1878, Qiaotun town was established at Tangshan and renamed Tangshan Town in 1889. In 1938, Tangshan City was formally founded. The administrative system of Tangshan during the Republic of China Republican era continued to follow the Qing system. In 1929, Zhili Province changed its name to Hebei Province. On January 28, 1939, because of Tangshan's special economic and political position, the East Hebei Autonomous Government established Tangshan City which was initially called “Tangshan Municipal Government” and later changed to “Tangshan Municipal Office”. After Japan surrendered in 1945, the Chinese Nationalist Party in Peking (now known as Beijing) took over the political control of Tangshan from Japan and set up an Administration Inspectors Office. In April 1946, it was decided at the 132nd Meeting of the Chinese Communist Party Hebei Provincial Committee to set up Tangshan City and on May 5 of the same year, the Tangshan Municipal government was founded.

=== People's Republic ===
After the establishment of the People's Republic of China on October 1, 1949, Tangshan remained a provincially administered municipality with 12 areas under its jurisdiction. In March 1955, it was decided at the 2nd session of the first People's Congress of Tangshan City to change Tangshan Municipal people's government to Tangshan people's committee without changing its administration areas.

On April 28, 1958, the State Council approved the establishment of Tangshan prefecture. On August 29, 1958, it was decided at the Seventh Session of the first People's Congress of Hebei Province to move the Tangshan Commissioner Office from Changli County to Tangshan City.

The CPC Central Committee decided to designate Tangshan city as one of the 45 cities open to the world on June 3, 1959. On June 8, 1959, the CPC Hebei Provincial Committee and the Hebei Provincial People's Congress decided to combine the Tangshan Commissioners Office and the Tangshan People's Committee into the Tangshan People's Committee. On April 2, 1960, the State Council officially approved the abolition of Tangshan prefecture. Qinhuangdao city, Qian'an, Changli, Laoting, Baodi, Yutian, Jixian County and Zunhua which were formerly administered by Tangshan Prefecture were incorporated into the Tangshan Municipality. Luanxian County, Fengrun County (formerly a district) and Baigezhuang Farm were also incorporated into Tangshan Municipality. Meanwhile, Tangshan became a provincially administered municipality.

On May 23, 1961, the State Council approved the reinstatement of Tangshan prefecture, which was adopted at the 14th Meeting of the Hebei Provincial People's Committee on June 3, 1959. Tangshan prefecture and Tangshan municipality were separated again and Tangshan turned into a specially administered municipality.

The Tangshan Municipal Revolutionary Committee affiliated to the Revolutionary Committee of Tangshan Region was set up on January 6, 1968. On March 11, 1978, Tangshan turned to be a provincially administered municipality.

In October 1982, it was decided at the Seventh People's Congress of Tangshan city to abolish the Tangshan Municipal Revolutionary Committee and set up the Tangshan Municipal People's Government.

The State Council approved the move on March 3, 1983, and thereafter implemented the city-governing-county system. On May 13, 1983, the Hebei Provincial People's Government announced the cancellation of the Civic Administration office of Tangshan region, which ceased operation on May 15, 1983.

On December 15, 1984, the State Council approved Tangshan city as one of 13 national “comparatively big” cities.

=== 1976 Tangshan earthquake ===
Tangshan suffered an earthquake of magnitude 7.8 (7.5 according to official reports) at 3:42 am on July 28, 1976, which resulted in many casualties. The official death toll was 255,000, but many experts believe that the actual number of fatalities was two to three times that number, making it the most destructive earthquake in modern history. As a result of the earthquake, most of the town had to be rebuilt. The earthquake was depicted in the 2010 movie Aftershock.

== Geography ==
Tangshan is located in the central section of the Bohai Economic Rim, facing the Bohai Sea to the south. Lying on the North China Plain, Tangshan is adjacent to the Yan Mountains to the north, borders the Luan River and Qinhuangdao to the east, and to the west and southwest borders Tianjin. Because of its location in the northeast of Hebei, it is a strategic area and a corridor linking two China's north and northeast regions. The largest river in the prefecture is the Luan River.

=== Climate ===
Tangshan has a monsoon-influenced, humid continental climate (Köppen Dwa), with cold and very dry winters, and hot, rainy summers. Spring and autumn are short with some rainfall. The monthly 24-hour average temperature in January is −3.6 °C (25.5 °F), and 26.9 °C (80.4 °F) in July, and the annual mean is 12.8 °C (55.0 °F). Close to 60% of the annual precipitation of 590 mm (23.2 in) falls in July and August alone. The frost-free period lasts 180–190 days, and the area receives 2,600–2,900 hours of sunshine annually.

Climate data for Tangshan, elevation 23 m (75 ft), (1991–2020 normals, extremes 1971–present)
Month	Jan	Feb	Mar	Apr	May	Jun	Jul	Aug	Sep	Oct	Nov	Dec	Year
Record high °C (°F)	12.9 (55.2)	19.5 (67.1)	28.3 (82.9)	32.8 (91.0)	38.8 (101.8)	39.6 (103.3)	40.1 (104.2)	36.3 (97.3)	35.3 (95.5)	31.4 (88.5)	22.7 (72.9)	13.2 (55.8)	40.1 (104.2)
Mean daily maximum °C (°F)	1.5 (34.7)	5.4 (41.7)	12.3 (54.1)	20.2 (68.4)	26.3 (79.3)	29.8 (85.6)	31.1 (88.0)	30.2 (86.4)	26.5 (79.7)	19.3 (66.7)	10.0 (50.0)	2.9 (37.2)	18.0 (64.3)
Daily mean °C (°F)	−4.6 (23.7)	−1.0 (30.2)	5.9 (42.6)	13.8 (56.8)	20.0 (68.0)	24.1 (75.4)	26.4 (79.5)	25.4 (77.7)	20.6 (69.1)	13.0 (55.4)	4.2 (39.6)	−2.6 (27.3)	12.1 (53.8)
Mean daily minimum °C (°F)	−9.5 (14.9)	−6.2 (20.8)	0.2 (32.4)	7.7 (45.9)	13.9 (57.0)	19.1 (66.4)	22.4 (72.3)	21.3 (70.3)	15.5 (59.9)	7.6 (45.7)	−0.6 (30.9)	−7.1 (19.2)	7.0 (44.6)
Record low °C (°F)	−25.2 (−13.4)	−19.8 (−3.6)	−14.6 (5.7)	−4.7 (23.5)	3.5 (38.3)	9.4 (48.9)	14.6 (58.3)	10.4 (50.7)	4.7 (40.5)	−5.6 (21.9)	−14.5 (5.9)	−17.0 (1.4)	−25.2 (−13.4)
Average precipitation mm (inches)	2.7 (0.11)	4.9 (0.19)	7.0 (0.28)	22.8 (0.90)	40.8 (1.61)	79.2 (3.12)	158.7 (6.25)	140.0 (5.51)	49.0 (1.93)	31.7 (1.25)	12.8 (0.50)	3.6 (0.14)	553.2 (21.79)
Average precipitation days (≥ 0.1 mm)	1.7	2.3	2.7	4.9	6.5	9.1	11.2	9.7	5.8	4.5	3.1	2.3	63.8
Average snowy days	2.9	2.4	1.0	0.2	0	0	0	0	0	0	1.7	2.9	11.1
Average relative humidity (%)	55	53	49	49	53	64	75	77	70	65	62	58	61
Mean monthly sunshine hours	178.2	186.5	233.8	246.9	270.0	230.5	190.3	204.4	214.0	202.6	166.5	167.9	2,491.6
Percentage possible sunshine	59	61	63	62	61	52	42	49	58	59	56	58	57
Source 1: China Meteorological Administration all-time extreme temperatureall-time August high
Source 2: Weather China

=== Air pollution ===
As air pollution in China has worsened in recent years, reports suggest cities in Hebei among the most polluted in the country, with Tangshan being no exception. According to a survey made by "Global voices China" in February 2013, 7 cities in Hebei including Xingtai, Shijiazhuang, Baoding, Handan, Langfang, Hengshui and Tangshan, are among China's 10 most polluted cities.

== Economy ==
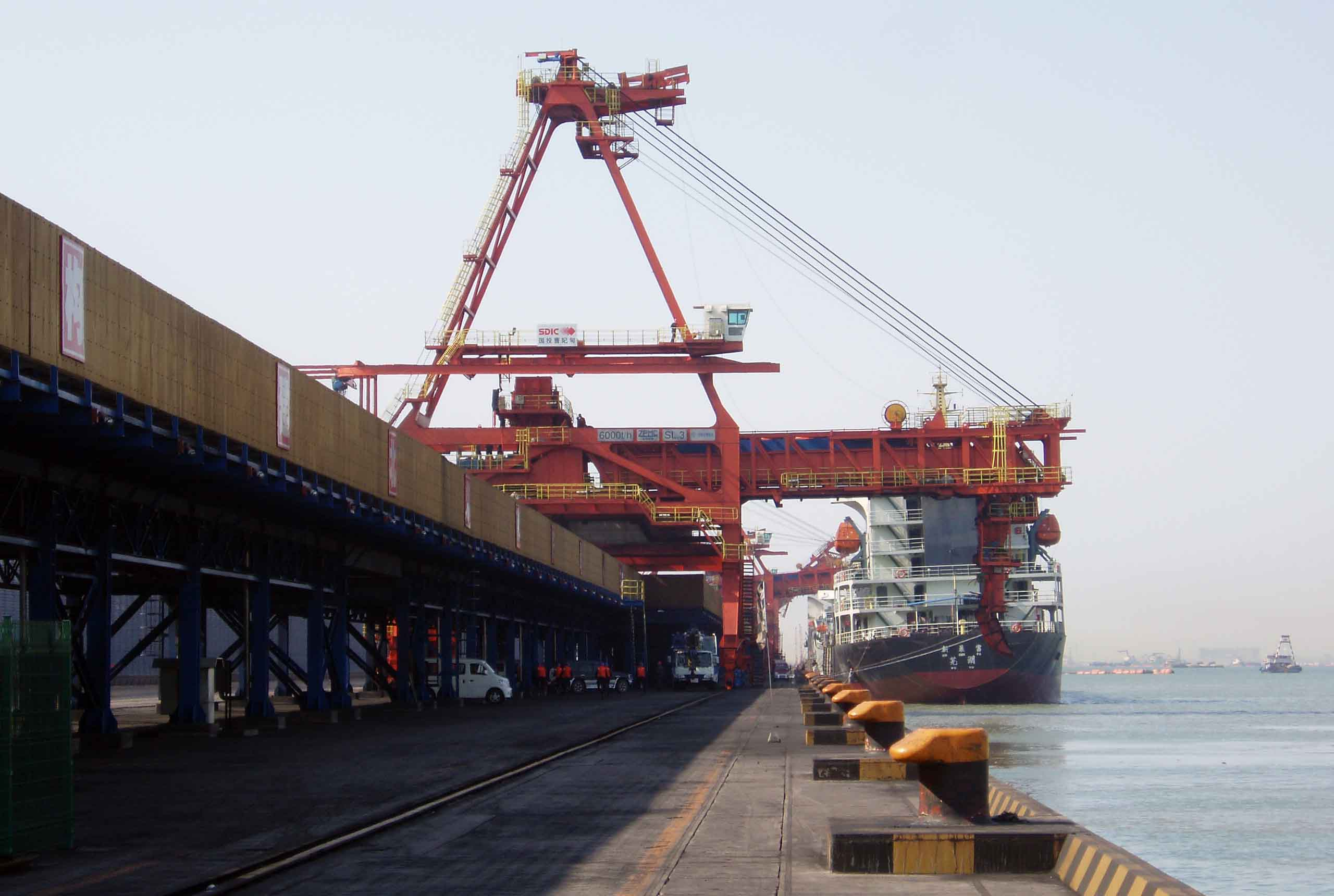
The Caofeidian Port

Tangshan is an important heavy industrial city in North China. Its output include machinery, motor vehicles, chemicals, textiles, glass, petroleum products, and cement. It has been a coal-mining center since late Qing dynasty, as Guangdong merchant Tong King-sing opened the first coal mine using modern techniques in Kaiping in 1877. Since the construction of the Caofeidian Project, it has hosted large iron and steel plants, chemical projects, and electricity plants. It is China's largest steel-producing city. Tangshan is also called the "porcelain capital of North China."

Modern industry in China first arose in Tangshan. The second railway in China – after the abortive Woosung Railway in Shanghai – was the six-mile track laid between Hsukochuang and Tangshan which opened in 1881; this eventually grew into the Imperial Railroad of North China and China's modern Jingshan and Jingha Railways. The first fire-resistant material manufactory and the first and largest cement manufactory were constructed in Tangshan as well.

Tangshan has experienced near-constant GDP growth in recent years, but has slowed down in the latter-half of the 2010s. In 2008, the GDP of Tangshan was ¥353.747 billion, which nearly doubled to ¥612.121 billion by 2013, and grew further to ¥695.500 billion in 2018. Tangshan's GDP was ranked the 26th largest among Chinese cities according to data from 2017. The city's exports were valued at $7.109 billion in 2016. Government figures for 2017 show that the city's economy was largely dominated by the secondary industry, contributing ¥408.14 billion to the city's economy.

=== Industrial zone ===
- Caofeidian New Zone.

== Demographics ==
Government data from 2017 shows that 7.897 million people live in Tangshan, of which, 61.64% live in an urban area. The city's residents had a mean disposable income of ¥27,786, which was ¥36,415 among urban residents.

=== Ethnic composition ===
Tangshan, like many other locations in China, is largely Han Chinese, who account for 95.25% of the city's population. In Zunhua City, there are 3 ethnic townships and ethnic towns. The following table shows the city's ethnic breakdown:

Tangshan ethnic composition (2017)
Ethnic group	Population (total)	Population (percent)
Han Chinese	7,194,200	95.25%
Manchu	287,700	3.81%
Hui	32,800	0.43%
Mongol	14,100	0.19%
Zhuang	12,900	0.17%
Other	13,700	0.18%

== Administration ==
The prefecture-level city of Tangshan administers 14 county-level divisions including 7 districts, 4 counties and 3 county-level cities.

Map
Name	Hanzi	Hanyu Pinyin	Population (2010 census)	Area (km^{2})	Density (/km^{2})	Seat
Lubei District	路北区	Lùběi Qū	743,504	112	6,638	Qiaotun Subdistrict
Lunan District	路南区	Lùnán Qū	311,076	355	876	South Xueyuan Road Subdistrict
↳Hangu Administration Zone*	汉沽管理区	Hàngū Guǎnlǐqū				
↳Lutai Economic Development Zone*	芦台经济技术开发区	Lútái Jīngjì Jìshù Kāifāqū				
Guye District	古冶区	Gǔyě Qū	358,461	253	1,417	Jinghua Subdistrict
Kaiping District	开平区	Kāipíng Qū	262,571	252	1,042	Kaiping Subdistrict
Fengrun District	丰润区	Fēngrùn Qū	916,092	1,334	687	Taiping Road Subdistrict
Fengnan District	丰南区	Fēngnán Qū	595,467	1,568	380	Qingnian Road Subdistrict
Built-up area			3,187,171	3,874	823	
Caofeidian District	曹妃甸区	Cáofēidiān Qū	184,931	700	264	Tanghai Town
Zunhua City	遵化市	Zūnhuà Shì	737,011	1,521	485	Wenhua Road Subdistrict
Qian'an City	迁安市	Qiān'ān Shì	728,160	1,208	603	Yongshun Subdistrict
Luanzhou City	滦州市	Luánzhōu Shì	554,315	999	555	Luanhe Subdistrict
Luannan County	滦南县	Luánnán Xiàn	584,518	1,270	460	Youyilu Subdistrict
Laoting County	乐亭县	Làotíng Xiàn	526,222	1,308	402	Lean Subdistrict
Qianxi County	迁西县	Qiānxī Xiàn	390,128	1,439	271	Lixiang Subdistrict
Yutian County	玉田县	Yùtián Xiàn	684,833	1,165	588	Wuzhong Subdistrict
*Hangu Administration Zone and Lutai Economic Development Zone is subordinate to Lunan District but formally part of Binhai New Area or Ninghe District in Tianjin.

== Education ==
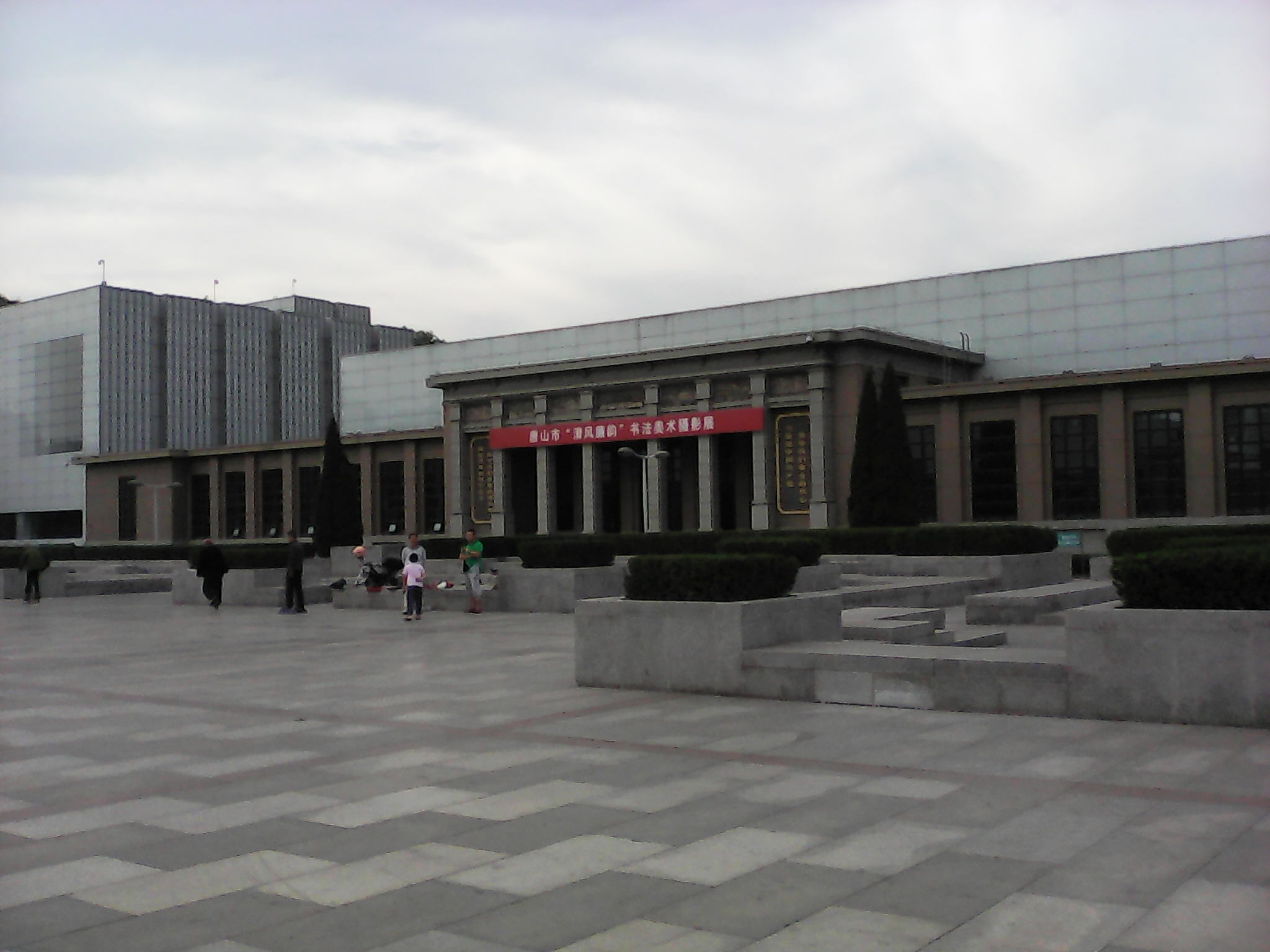
Tangshan Museum

=== Universities and colleges ===
- North China University of Science and Technology (formerly named Hebei United University), which was co-established by Hebei Polytechnic University and North China Coal Medical College in May 2010
- Tangshan Normal University
- Tangshan College
- Hebei University of Science and Technology Tangshan Branch

=== High schools ===
- Tangshan No.1 high school (founded 1902), one of the most famous high schools in China
- Hebei Tangshan Foreign Language School

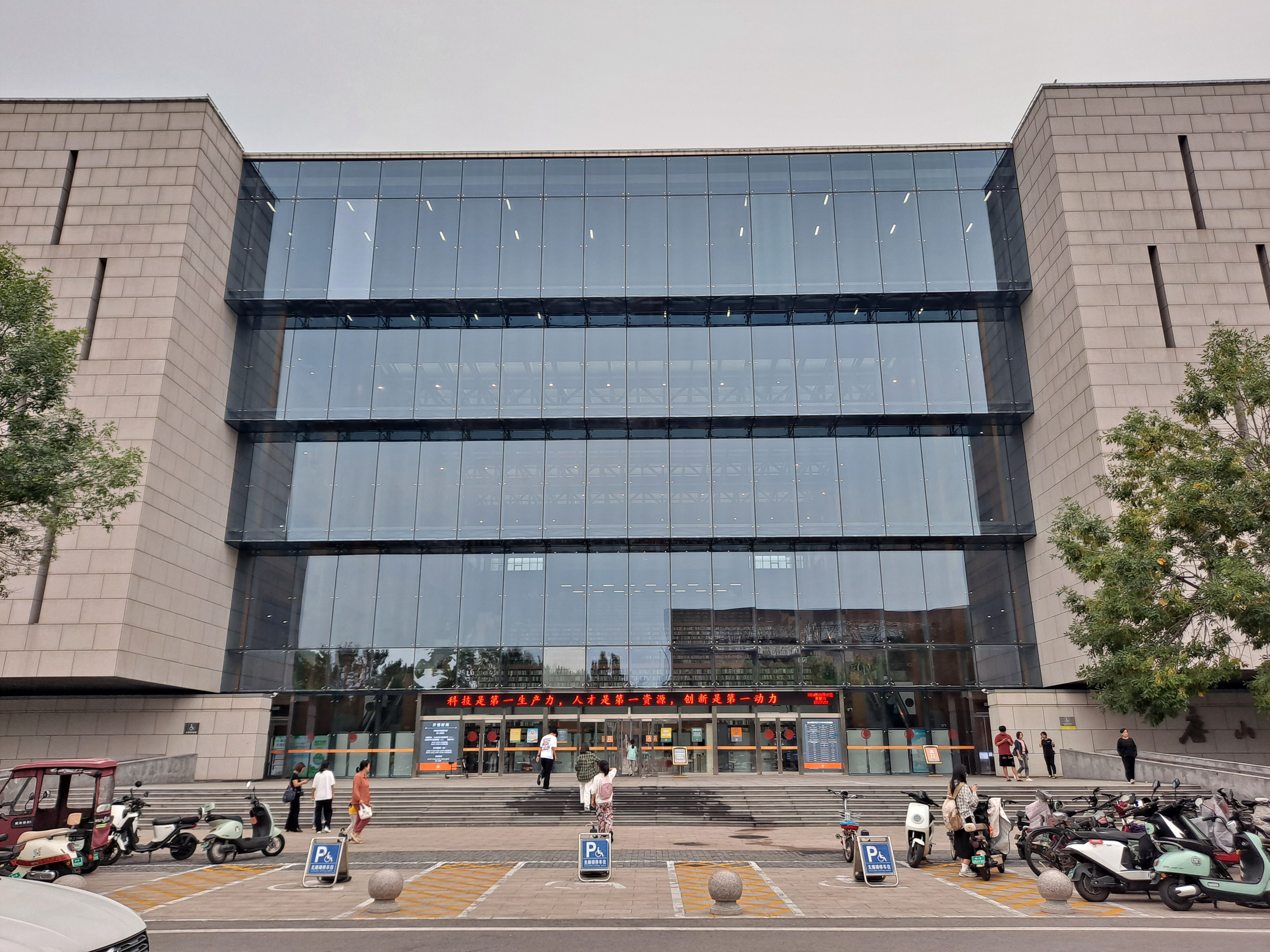
Tangshan Library in 2024

== Culture ==
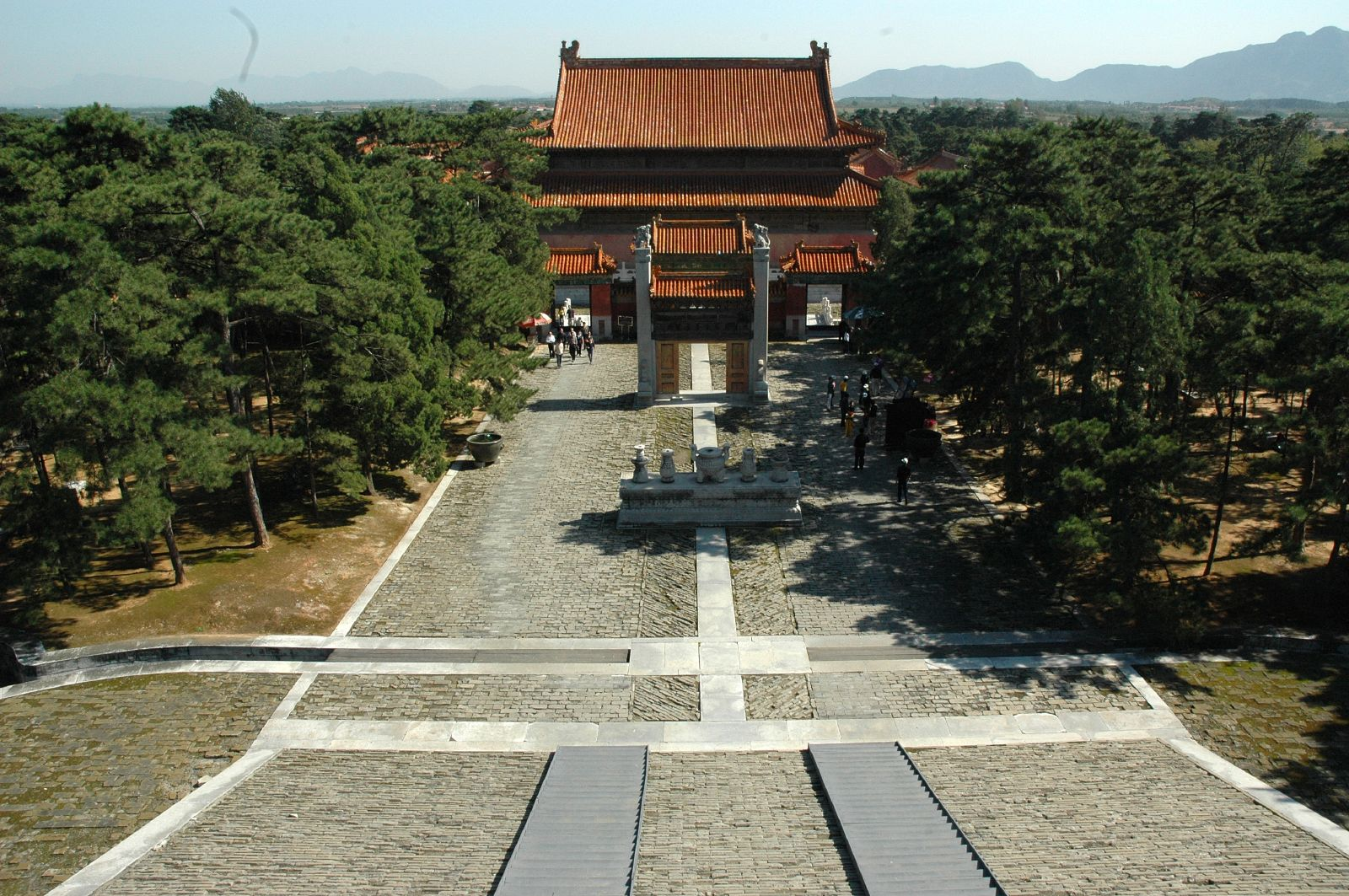
Eastern Qing tombs

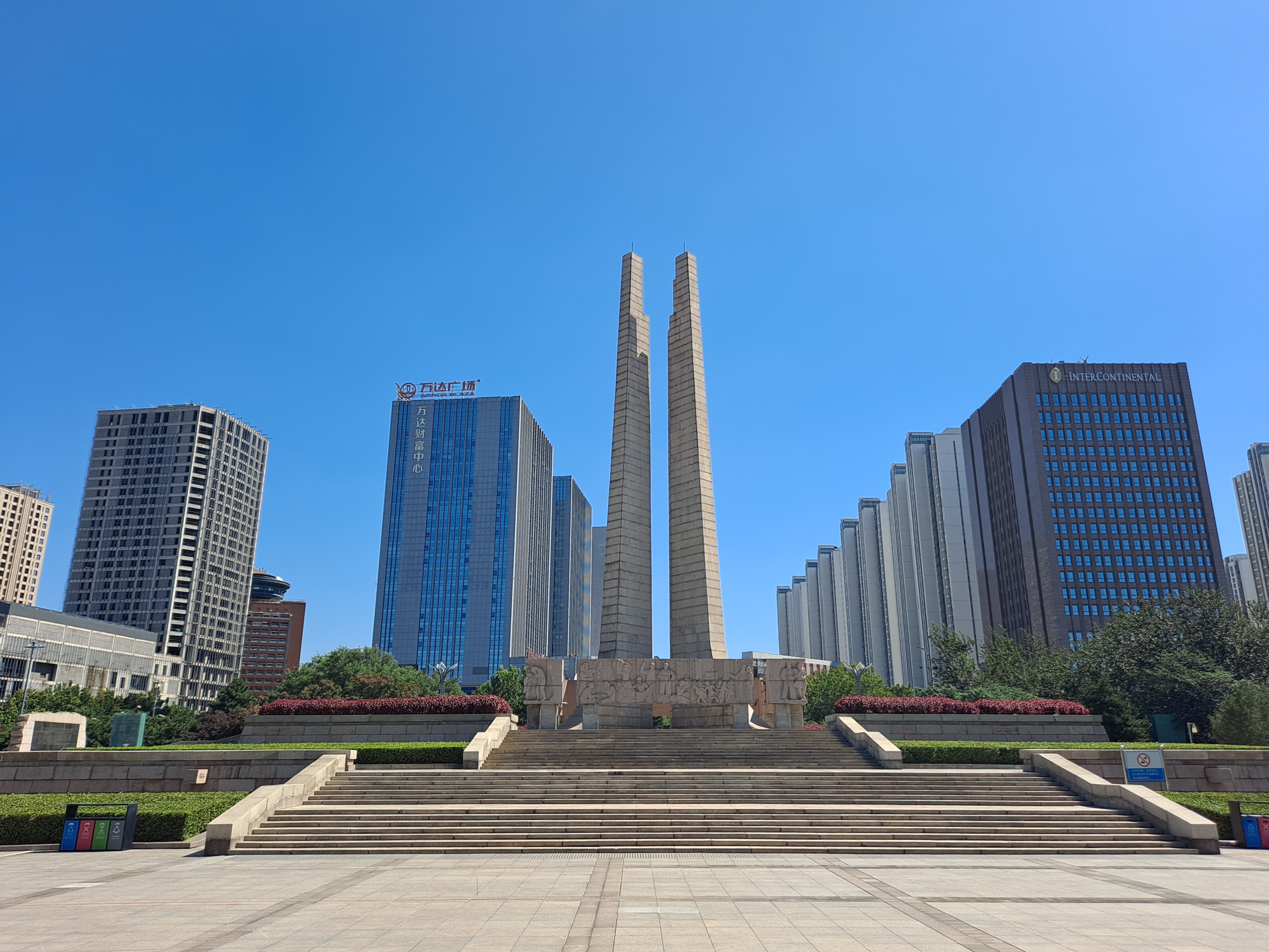
The Anti-seismic Monument

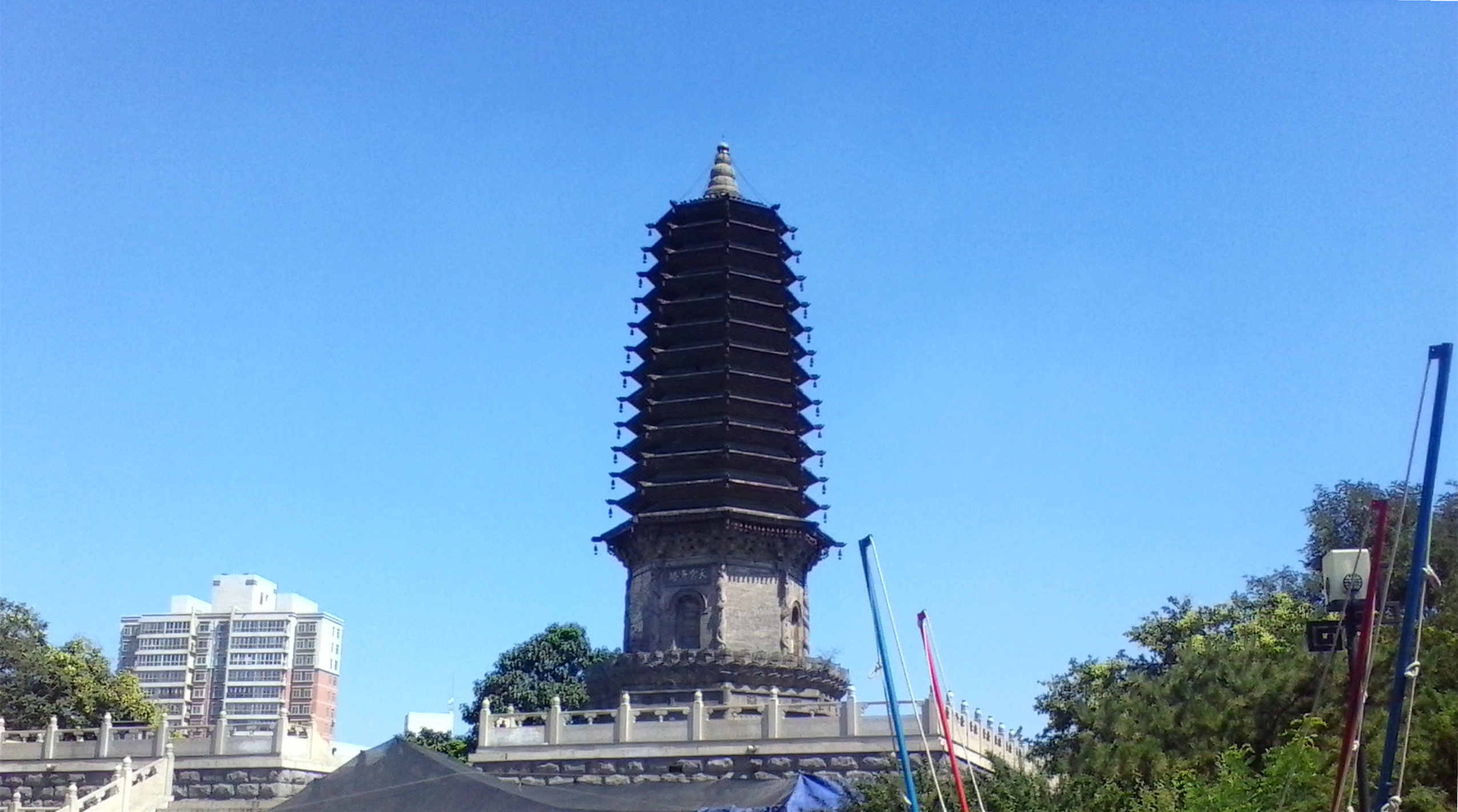
The Pagoda in the Site of Tiangong Temple

=== Food ===
- Diet
  - Wanlixiang roast chicken (萬里香燒雞)
  - Chessboard pancake (棋子燒餠)
  - Honey sugar candy (蜂蜜麻糖)
  - Peanut crisp (花生酥糖)
  - Big gezhe (大格摺)
  - Small gezhe (小格摺)
- Dried fruits
  - Chinese chestnut (板栗)
  - Walnut

=== Traditional arts ===
- Ping opera, or Pingju, one of the most popular operas in China
- Tangshan Shadow Play (唐山皮影)
- Laoting drums (樂亭大鼓)

=== Tourism ===
- Eastern Qing tombs
- Anti-Seismic Monument, located in Anti-Seismic Square
- Tangshan Nanhu Park (Lunan District)
- Kailuan National Mine Park (Lunan District)
- Tangshan science and Technology Museum (Lubei District)

=== Religion ===
- Datang Xingguo Chan Temple (大唐興國禪寺), a Buddhist temple
- Jingzhong Mountain, a joint religious shrine for the believers of Confucianism, Buddhism, and Taoism, respectively.
- Two Christian churches.

== Transport ==
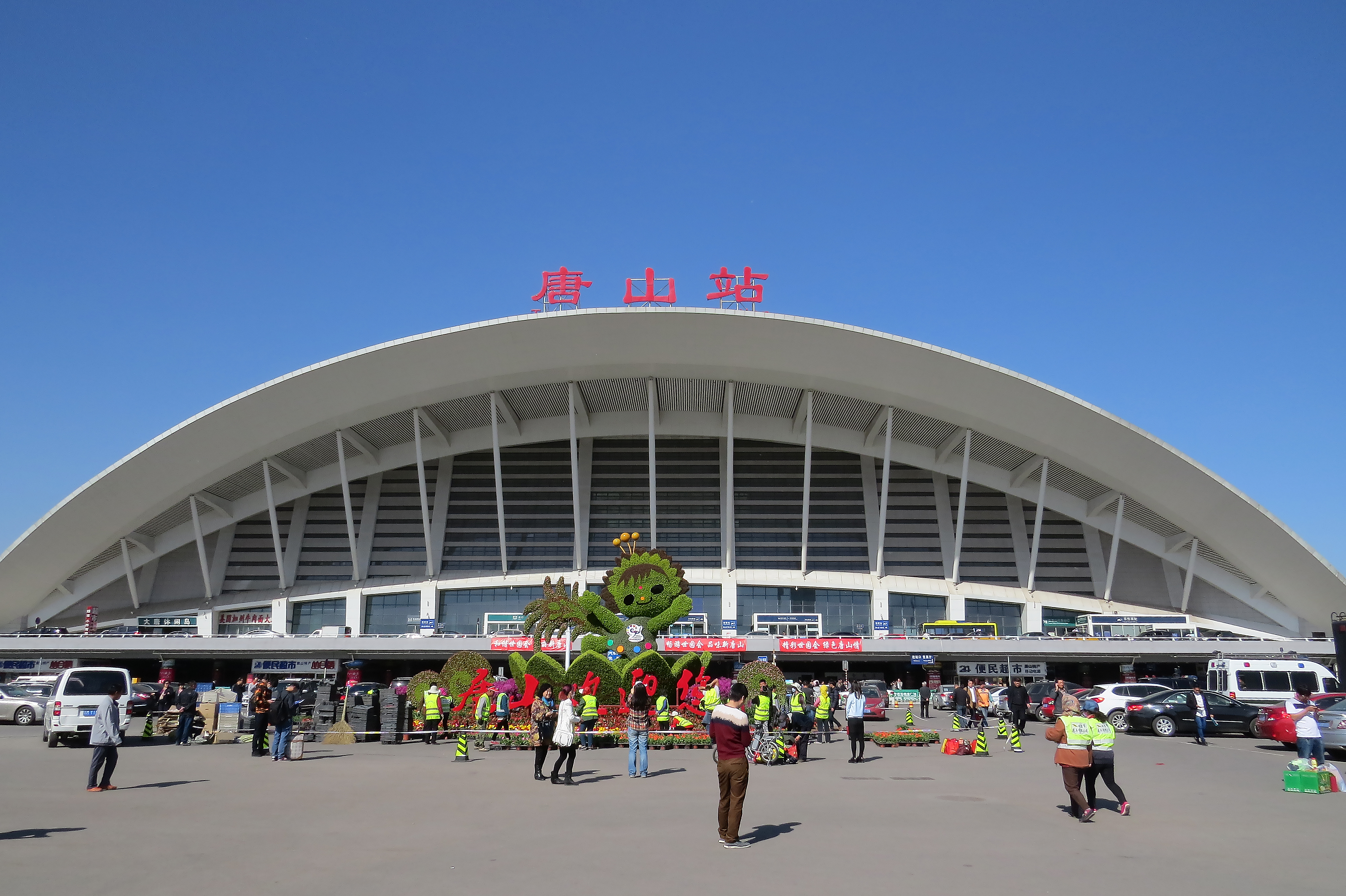
Tangshan Railway Station

As of 2017, Tangshan has 18,000 kilometers of roads, of which, 16,000 were in rural areas. The city's roads served 410 million tons of freight, and the city's port served 570 million tons. As of 2023, Tangshan is the largest city in China without an operating or planned metro system.

=== Air ===
- Tangshan Sannühe Airport, 20 kilometers (12 mi) from the city center, in Fengrun District

=== Rail ===
- Beijing–Harbin Railway
- Tianjin–Shanhaiguan Railway
- Beijing–Qinhuangdao Railway
- Tianjin–Shanxi Railway

=== Roads ===
- China National Highway 102, in the south of Fengrun District
- China National Highway 112, ring road encircling Beijing, traversing the west side of Tangshan's urban area
- China National Highway 205, which runs along the eastern and southern front of the urban area
- G1 Beijing–Harbin Expressway, on the northern side of the urban area
- G25 Changchun–Shenzhen Expressway, on the western side of the urban area

== Notable people ==
- Li Dazhao – early founder and leader of Chinese Communist Party
- Li Lu – Chinese-born American investor
- Jiang Wen – a contemporary director and actor
- Cao Xueqin – author of Dream of the Red Chamber
- Liu Wenjin – classical Chinese music composer
- Zhang Tielin – Chinese-born British actor
- Zhao Lijian – Chinese spokesman of the Ministry of Foreign Affairs
- Gao Yuanyuan – Chinese actress and model
- Tseng Cheng – businessman and philanthropist
- Wu Guiying – Chinese Communist Party Secretary of Changsha
- Zhang Xudong – general of the PLA and former commander of the Western Theater Command
- Fu Zhenghua – former politician and Minister of Justice

== See also ==
- List of twin towns and sister cities in China
- 1976 Tangshan earthquake
- 2022 Tangshan restaurant attack
