= Sun Lijun political clique =

- Simplified Chinese: 孙力军政治团伙
Transcriptions
Standard Mandarin
- Hanyu Pinyin: Sūnlìjūn zhèngzhì tuánhuǒ

Abbreviation
- Simplified Chinese: 孙力军团伙
Transcriptions
Standard Mandarin
- Hanyu Pinyin: Sūnlìjūn tuánhuǒ

The “Sun Lijun political clique” refers to the criminal group and political gang within the Chinese Communist Party (CCP) headed by Sun Lijun, former member of the Party Committee of the Ministry of Public Security and Vice Minister of Public Security, which was officially identified by the Chinese government and was destroyed in the process of the 19th Central Committee of the Chinese Communist Party with Xi Jinping as the core promoting the comprehensive and strict governance of the Party. The gang and the crimes involved were first exposed in the first episode of the special documentary “Zero Tolerance” broadcast by China Central Television on 15 January 2022.

== Members ==
At least eight members of the gang have been publicly identified:

1. Sun Lijun, male, Han ethnicity, from Qingdao, Shandong Province. Former member of the Party Committee of the Ministry of Public Security and Vice Minister of Public Security. In September 2021, he was expelled from the Party and dismissed from public office. The disciplinary notice used extremely harsh language, stating that he "betrayed the Two Upholds, lacked any sense of the Four Consciousnesses, had extremely inflated political ambitions, extremely poor political character, and extremely distorted views on power and performance." On 13 January 2022, the case of Sun Lijun, suspected of bribery, manipulating the securities market, and illegally possessing firearms, was investigated and concluded by the National Supervisory Commission and the Changchun Municipal Public Security Bureau, respectively. Upon designation by the Supreme People's Procuratorate, the Changchun Municipal People's Procuratorate of Jilin Province reviewed and prosecuted the case. On 23 September, the Changchun Intermediate People's Court of Jilin Province sentenced him to death with a two-year reprieve for bribery, manipulating the securities market, and illegally possessing firearms, deprived him of his political rights for life, and confiscated all his personal property. After the two-year reprieve period, his sentence will be commuted to life imprisonment without the possibility of parole or commutation.
2. Wang Like, male, Manchu ethnicity, from Beizhen, Liaoning Province. Former Standing Committee Member of the Jiangsu Provincial Committee of the Chinese Communist Party and Secretary of the Provincial Political and Legal Affairs Commission, and a representative to the 13th National People's Congress. Wang Like met Sun Lijun in 2008 and began bribing Sun Lijun in 2011. Through Sun Lijun's influence, Wang Like rose through the ranks to become a Standing Committee Member of the CCP Jiangsu Provincial Committee and Secretary of the Provincial Political and Legal Affairs Commission. Wang Like bribed Sun Lijun multiple times with United States dollar cash hidden in small seafood boxes, totaling over ¥90 million renminbi. In October 2020, Wang Like surrendered himself to the Central Commission for Discipline Inspection and the National Supervisory Commission. In February 2021, his qualification as a representative to the National People's Congress was suspended. In September, he was expelled from the Party and dismissed from public office. On 29 December, the case of Wang Like, suspected of bribery, offering bribes, harboring and condoning organized crime, and forging identity documents, was investigated and concluded by the National Supervisory Commission and the Changchun Municipal Public Security Bureau of Jilin Province. Upon designation by the Supreme People's Procuratorate, the Changchun Municipal People's Procuratorate of Jilin Province reviewed and prosecuted the case. On 22 September 2022, he was sentenced to death with a two-year reprieve by the Intermediate People's Court of Changchun City, Jilin Province, for bribery, offering bribes, harboring and condoning organized crime, and forging identity documents. He was also deprived of his political rights for life and all his personal property was confiscated. After the two-year reprieve period expires, his sentence will be commuted to life imprisonment in accordance with the law, and he will be imprisoned for life without the possibility of commutation or parole.
3. Gong Daoan, male, Han ethnicity, from Gong'an County, Hubei Province. Former Vice Mayor and Director of the Shanghai Municipal Public Security Bureau. In 2010, at a national training course for municipal public security bureau chiefs, Sun Lijun recruited Gong Daoan into his inner circle. Through Sun Lijun's active recommendation and manipulation, Gong Daoan was promoted to deputy director of the Technical Investigation Bureau of the Ministry of Public Security, and subsequently to Director of the Technical Investigation Bureau, Director of the Shanghai Municipal Public Security Bureau, and Vice Mayor of Shanghai. Sun Lijun used a large sum of money from his bribes to help Gong Daoan with various issues, such as housing for his children and employment for his relatives, and also gave "bonuses" to Gong Daoan's subordinates, incentivizing Gong Daoan to serve him wholeheartedly. In September 2020, he was removed from his positions as Vice Mayor of Shanghai and Director of the Shanghai Municipal Public Security Bureau. In February 2021, he was expelled from the Party and dismissed from public office. In March 2021, after the National Supervisory Commission concluded its investigation into Gong Daoan's suspected bribery case, it was transferred to the Supreme People's Procuratorate for review and prosecution. The Supreme People's Procuratorate designated the case to the Tangshan Municipal People's Procuratorate of Hebei Province for review and prosecution. On 21 September 2022, the Tangshan Intermediate People's Court of Hebei Province sentenced him to life imprisonment for bribery, deprived him of his political rights for life, and confiscated all of his personal property.
4. Deng Huilin, male, Han ethnicity, from Wuhan, Hubei Province. Former Vice Mayor and Director of the Public Security Bureau of Chongqing Municipality, and a delegate to the 19th National Congress of the Chinese Communist Party. While serving as Director of the Public Security Bureau of Yichang City, Hubei Province, Deng Huilin was introduced to Sun Lijun by Gong Daoan. Sun Lijun helped Deng Huilin successively become Director of the Office of the Central Political and Legal Affairs Commission, Director of the Public Security Bureau of Chongqing Municipality, and Vice Mayor of Chongqing Municipality. On 24 June 2020, he was removed from his positions as Vice Mayor of Chongqing Municipality and Director of the Public Security Bureau of Chongqing Municipality. In January 2021, he was expelled from the Party. On January 22 of the same year, the investigation into Deng Huilin's suspected bribery case was concluded by the National Supervisory Commission and transferred to the procuratorial organ for review and prosecution. The Supreme People's Procuratorate made a decision to arrest Deng Huilin on suspicion of bribery. In February, the Baoding Municipal People's Procuratorate filed a public prosecution against Deng Huilin with the Baoding Intermediate People's Court. On 21 September, he was sentenced to fifteen years imprisonment for bribery by the Baoding Intermediate People's Court of Hebei Province.
5. Liu Xinyun, male, Han ethnicity, from Zibo, Shandong Province, was the former Vice Governor of Shanxi Province and Director of the Shanxi Provincial Public Security Department. In 2014, during a meeting of the Ministry of Public Security in Jinan, Liu Xinyun, then Director of the Jinan Municipal Public Security Bureau, actively sought to curry favor with Sun Lijun. Through Sun Lijun's connections, in December 2014, Liu Xinyun was transferred to the position of Director of the Cybersecurity Bureau of the Ministry of Public Security. On 23 April 2021, he was removed from his positions as Vice Governor of Shanxi Province and Director of the Shanxi Provincial Public Security Department. On 16 August, he was expelled from the Party and dismissed from public office. On 9 October, the investigation into Liu Xinyun's suspected bribery and abuse of power was concluded by the National Supervisory Commission, and, upon designation by the Supreme People's Procuratorate, the Langfang Municipal People's Procuratorate of Hebei Province reviewed and prosecuted the case. On 21 September 2022, the Langfang Intermediate People's Court of Hebei Province sentenced him to fourteen years imprisonment for bribery and abuse of power.
6. Fu Zhenghua, male, Han ethnicity, from Luanxian County, Hebei Province, was the former Executive Vice Minister of Public Security and Deputy Secretary of the Party Group of the Ministry of Justice and the Minister of Justice. On 31 March 2022, he was expelled from the Party and dismissed from public office. In 2008, while working at the Beijing Municipal Public Security Bureau, Fu Zhenghua met Sun Lijun, then deputy director of the General Office of the Ministry of Public Security. On 21 September, he was sentenced to death with a two-year reprieve by the Changchun Intermediate People's Court for bribery and abuse of power, deprived of political rights for life, and all his personal property was confiscated. After the two-year reprieve period expired, his sentence was reduced to life imprisonment in accordance with the law, and he was imprisoned for life without the possibility of commutation or parole.
7. Liu Yanping, male, Han ethnicity, from Fengnan, Hebei Province, was the head of the Discipline Inspection and Supervision Group of the Central Commission for Discipline Inspection and the National Supervisory Commission stationed in the Ministry of State Security and a member of the Party Committee of the Ministry of State Security. He was expelled from the Party and removed from public office on 1 September 2022. He was accused of "completely degenerating politically, joining the political clique of Sun Lijun, engaging in political interest exchanges, speculating and currying favor, and manipulating power". On 10 January 2023, he was sentenced to death with a two-year reprieve by the Intermediate People's Court of Changchun City, Jilin Province for bribery, deprived of political rights for life, and all his personal property was confiscated. After the two-year reprieve period expired, his sentence was reduced to life imprisonment in accordance with the law, and he will be imprisoned for life without the possibility of commutation or parole.
8. Liu Leguo, male, Han ethnicity, born in February 1957, started working in December 1975, joined the Chinese Communist Party in November 1982, with a university degree. He once served as a member of the Party Committee and deputy director of the Liaoning Provincial Public Security Department, and Deputy Mayor and Director of the Public Security Bureau of Dalian Municipal Government. He retired in March 2019. In May 2022, he was subject to disciplinary review and supervisory investigation by the Liaoning Provincial Commission for Discipline Inspection and Supervision. In December 2022, he was expelled from the Party. He was accused of "illegally storing classified materials and ammunition, and attaching himself to the political gang of Sun Lijun". In January 2023, he was prosecuted by the Shenyang Municipal People's Procuratorate.

== Reactions ==
The China Central Television described it as a typical case of “political and economic problems intertwined, violating the Party’s original mission, shaking the Party’s ruling foundation, and affecting the political security of the Party and the country”. It continued “The problems of Sun Lijun’s gang mostly occurred after the 18th or even 19th National Congress of the Chinese Communist Party. They did not restrain themselves and even intensified their actions, abusing law enforcement and judicial power and colluding deeply with businessmen. Sun Lijun and others received huge amounts of money by providing assistance to others in matters such as job promotion, business operation, and project contracting. Among them, Sun Lijun and Wang Like received hundreds of millions of renminbi, and others received tens of millions to more than ¥100 million renminbi.”

Gu Hui, a staff member of the Central Commission for Discipline Inspection and the National Supervisory Commission, commented that Sun was “a typical example of a person who was extremely corrupt and degenerate, with intertwined political and economic problems”, and that he “formed cliques, factions, and personal power, and created interest groups, which seriously endangered political security”. Sun Dongsheng, deputy director of the Case Review Office of the Central Commission for Discipline Inspection and the National Supervisory Commission, commented that “Sun Lijun’s case is a typical case involving both political and economic issues. In particular, these people defied the rules and regulations, broke the law, formed cliques and factions, and embezzled and bribed huge sums of money, which had a very bad influence. This is one of the most serious cases we have investigated since the 19th National Congress of the Chinese Communist Party, which reflects the Party Central Committee’s zero-tolerance attitude and determination towards corrupt elements and corrupt behavior ”

Sun Lijun was described as the main figure in this political gang, but there were members in the gang, such as Fu Zhenghua, who was of a higher rank than Sun Lijun, which led to the questioning of this characterization by overseas media. Some overseas media believed that the actual main figures of the "Sun Lijun gang" were Meng Jianzhu, former CCP Politburo member and Secretary of the Central Political and Legal Affairs Commission, who had served as Sun Lijun's secretary, and Guo Shengkun, who had held the same position.

== Investigation ==
The case is still under investigation.

On 24 January 2022, the Ministry of Public Security held a special meeting on eliminating the pernicious influence of Sun Lijun's political gang. Wang Xiaohong, Secretary of the Party Committee of the Ministry of Public Security and Vice Minister in charge of daily work, attended and delivered a speech. The meeting pointed out the harm of Sun Lijun's political gang and deployed relevant work in the future. The Party Committee of the Ministry of Public Security has established a special working group for eliminating the pernicious influence of Sun Lijun's political gang. Public security organs at all levels should establish corresponding leadership and working bodies as soon as possible, and under the leadership of the Party Committee and the government, strengthen communication and cooperation with discipline inspection and supervision, organization and personnel departments to ensure the elimination of the pernicious influence of Sun Lijun.
