= Shigezhuang =

Shigezhuang may refers to one of the following places in China:

- Shigezhuang Subdistrict, a subdistrict of Changping District, Beijing
- Shigezhuang, Wuqing, a town in Wuqing District, Tianjin
- Shigezhuang, Baodi, a town in Baodi District, Tianjin
- Shigezhuang, Tangshan, a town in Fengrun District, Tangshan, Hebei
- Shigezhuang, Langfang, a town in Wen'an County, Langfang, Hebei
