= Liu Yanping =

Chinese politician

- 刘彦平

Secretary of the Central Discipline Inspection Committee of the Ministry of State Security
- In office May 2015 – March 2022
- Minister: Chen Wenqing

Personal details
- Born: August 1955 (age 71) Fengnan County, Hebei, China
- Party: Chinese Communist Party (1979–2022; expelled)
- Education: China University of Political Science and Law

Chinese name
- Simplified Chinese: 刘彦平
- Traditional Chinese: 劉彥平
Transcriptions
Standard Mandarin
- Hanyu Pinyin: Liú Yànpíng

Liu Yanping (Chinese: 刘彦平; born August 1955) is a Chinese politician who served as vice minister of Public Security between 2013 and 2015. From 2015 onwards he served as the secretary of the Central Discipline Inspection Committee (a branch of the Central Discipline Inspection Commission (CCDI)) within the Ministry of State Security (MSS). In March 2022 Chinese state media reported that Liu had been placed under investigation by the CCDI for "violations of law and party discipline" (a euphemism for either political mistakes or corruption). He is the 12th high-ranking official in China to be targeted by China's top anticorruption watchdog in 2022. Liu crossed paths with Li Dongsheng, Meng Hongwei and Fu Zhenghua, and was known to be a close ally of Sun Lijun.

He was a delegate to the 9th National People's Congress and a member of the 13th National Committee of the Chinese People's Political Consultative Conference.

In January 2023, Liu was sentenced to death with reprieve for charges of bribery.

== Biography ==
Liu was born in Fengnan County (now Fengnan District of Tangshan), Hebei, in August 1955. He secondary studied at Beijing Huiwen School (北京汇文中学). In 1974, he became a sent-down youth in Tong County (now Tongzhou District, Beijing). He joined the Chinese Communist Party in December 1979.

After graduating from China University of Political Science and Law, he was assigned to the Beijing Municipal Public Security Bureau and later the MPS. In 2009, he was elevated to director of the Security Bureau of the Ministry of Public Security. He was assistant minister of Public Security in August 2011, and held that office until June 2013, when he was promoted again to become vice minister. In October 2015, he replaced Huang Dianzhong as secretary of the Discipline Inspection Committee of the MSS. In May 2017, he went to the United States to persuade Guo Wengui to return to China and turn himself in. In September 2019, he was made leader of the 14th Inspection Team of the 2nd Eound of the 19th Central Committee of the Chinese Communist Party.

=== Downfall ===
On 12 March 2022, he was put under investigation for alleged "serious violations of discipline and laws" by the CCDI, the party's internal disciplinary body, and the National Supervisory Commission, the highest anti-corruption agency of China. His colleagues, Sun Lijun and Fu Zhenghua were sacked for graft in 2021. On September 1, he was expelled from the CCP and removed from public office.

On November 17, he stood trial at the Intermediate People's Court of Changchun on charges of taking bribes. Prosecutors accused him of taking advantage of his different positions in the central government between 2001 and 2020 to seek profits for various companies and individuals in enterprise operation, case handling, work arrangement, license plate handling. In return, he accepted money and property worth over 234 million yuan (about 33.12 million U.S. dollars).

On 10 January 2023, Liu was found guilty of bribery and sentenced to death with reprieve, which can be commuted to life imprisonment without the possibility of parole if Liu maintained good behaviour in prison.

Government offices
Preceded by ?	Director of the Security Bureau of the Ministry of Public Security; 2009–2014	Succeeded by Zhang Zhiwen (张智文)
Party political offices
Preceded by Huang Dianzhong	Secretary of the Discipline Inspection Committee of the Ministry of State Security; 2015–2022	Succeeded by Position revoked
