= Fengrun, Tangshan =

Fengrun 丰润区
- District
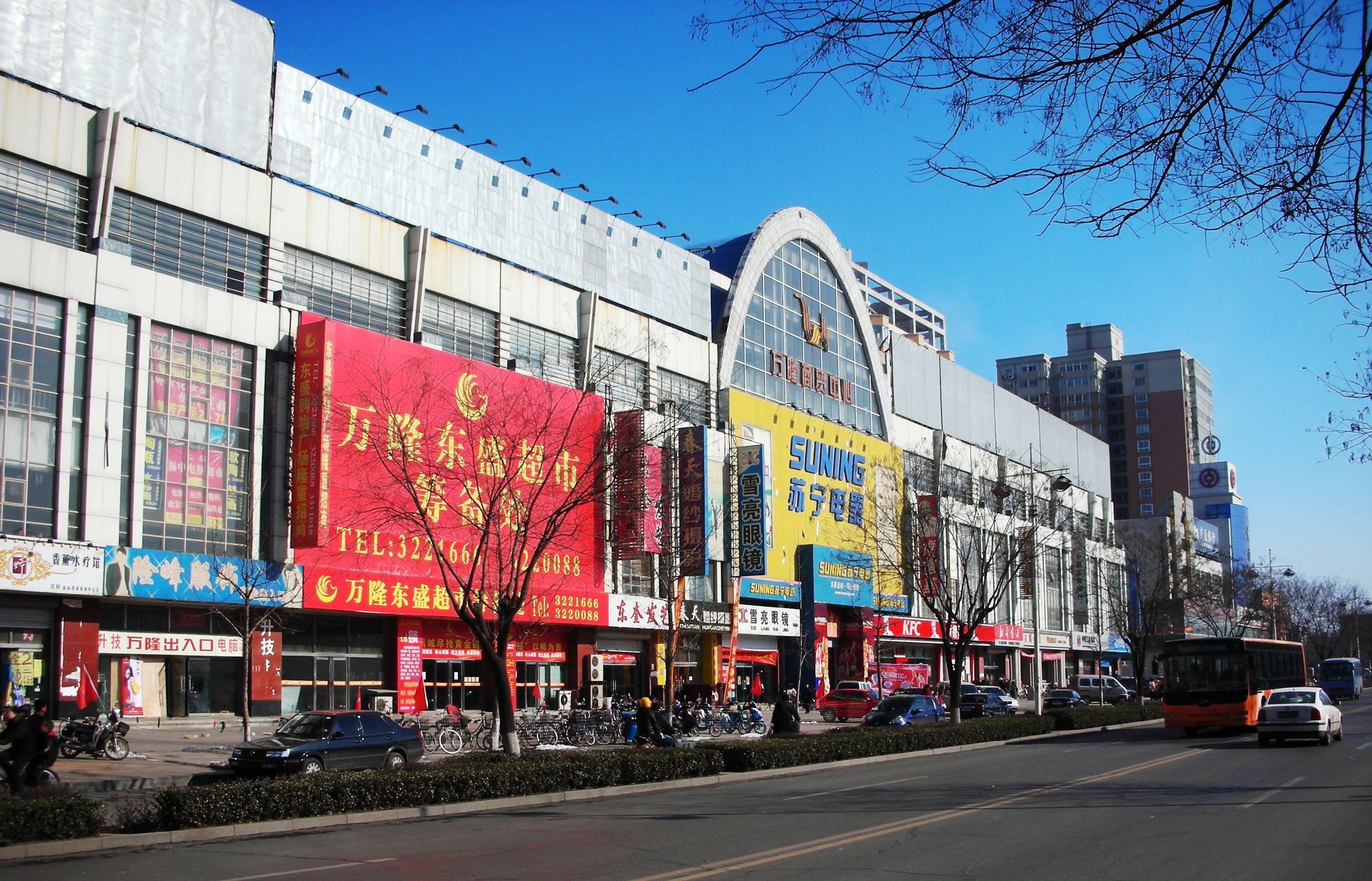
- A shopping mall in Fengrun

- Location in Hebei
- Coordinates: 39°49′57″N 118°09′44″E
- Country: People's Republic of China
- Province: Hebei
- Prefecture-level city: Tangshan

Area
  - Total: 1,219 km^{2} (471 sq mi)

Population (2020 census)
  - Total: 800,740
  - Density: 656.9/km^{2} (1,701/sq mi)
- Time zone: UTC+8 (China Standard)

Fengrun District (simplified Chinese: 丰润区; traditional Chinese: 豐潤區; pinyin: Fēngrùn Qū) is a district of the city of Tangshan, Hebei province, China. The district spans an area of 1,326 square kilometres (512 mi^{2}), and has a population of 800,740 as of 2020.

== History ==
During the Warring States period, the area of present-day Fengrun District belonged to the Yan State. In the Qin dynasty, the area was incorporated as part of the Youbeiping Commandery. During the Western Han dynasty, the area belonged to Tuyin County (土垠县; 土垠縣; Tǔyín Xiàn), Xuwu County (徐无县; 徐無縣; Xúwú Xiàn), and Changcheng County (昌城县; 昌城縣; Chāngchéng Xiàn). During the Northern Qi dynasty, Tuyin County was abolished, and merged into Wuzhong County (无终县; 無終縣; Wúzhōng Xiàn).

In 1187, during the Jin dynasty, the area was reorganized as Yongji County (永济县; 永濟縣; Yǒngjì Xiàn). In 1209, Yongji County was reorganized as Fengrun County, which it remains today, although some put the date of this change at 1368, during the Ming dynasty.

=== People's Republic of China ===
In 1983, Fengrun County was placed under the jurisdiction of Tangshan.

On February 1, 2002, Fengrun County was upgraded to a district, and absorbed the now-defunct Tangshan New Area (唐山市新区).

On January 28, 2011, three administrative villages from the town of Chahe were transferred from Fengrun District to the town of Fengnan (now Xugezhuang) in neighboring Fengnan District.

In June 2013, Tangshan's municipal government moved the town of Hancheng from Fengrun District to neighboring Lubei District, and the town of Laozhuangzi was moved under the jurisdiction of the Tangshan New Technology Development Zone. In December 2013, the municipal government moved the remainder of Chahe to Fengnan District.

== Geography ==
Fengrun District is located within the prefecture-level city of Tangshan, in the eastern part of Hebei province. The district is bordered by Tangshan's urban core to the south, and Ninghe District in Tianjin to the southwest.

The Yan Mountains lie to the north of the district, and the district's elevation generally decreases from the northeast to the southwest. Elevation within Fengrun District ranges from 1 metre (3.3 ft) to 648 metres (2,126 ft) above sea level. The Huanxiang River and the Dou River both run through the district.

=== Climate ===
Climate data for Fengrun, elevation 32 m (105 ft), (1991–2020 normals, extremes 1981–2010)
Month	Jan	Feb	Mar	Apr	May	Jun	Jul	Aug	Sep	Oct	Nov	Dec	Year
Record high °C (°F)	12.6 (54.7)	19.2 (66.6)	28.5 (83.3)	32.7 (90.9)	37.2 (99.0)	38.6 (101.5)	39.6 (103.3)	35.9 (96.6)	33.7 (92.7)	31.3 (88.3)	21.6 (70.9)	13.5 (56.3)	39.6 (103.3)
Mean daily maximum °C (°F)	1.5 (34.7)	5.4 (41.7)	12.4 (54.3)	20.1 (68.2)	26.4 (79.5)	29.9 (85.8)	31.1 (88.0)	30.2 (86.4)	26.4 (79.5)	19.2 (66.6)	9.9 (49.8)	2.8 (37.0)	17.9 (64.3)
Daily mean °C (°F)	−4.5 (23.9)	−1.0 (30.2)	5.9 (42.6)	13.7 (56.7)	20.0 (68.0)	24.1 (75.4)	26.3 (79.3)	25.2 (77.4)	20.4 (68.7)	13.0 (55.4)	4.3 (39.7)	−2.5 (27.5)	12.1 (53.7)
Mean daily minimum °C (°F)	−9.2 (15.4)	−6.0 (21.2)	0.5 (32.9)	7.8 (46.0)	13.9 (57.0)	19.0 (66.2)	22.3 (72.1)	21.2 (70.2)	15.4 (59.7)	7.8 (46.0)	−0.3 (31.5)	−6.8 (19.8)	7.1 (44.8)
Record low °C (°F)	−24.6 (−12.3)	−20.0 (−4.0)	−12.9 (8.8)	−3.5 (25.7)	3.5 (38.3)	9.5 (49.1)	15.4 (59.7)	11.9 (53.4)	2.5 (36.5)	−5.1 (22.8)	−13.6 (7.5)	−17.7 (0.1)	−24.6 (−12.3)
Average precipitation mm (inches)	2.7 (0.11)	4.6 (0.18)	7.3 (0.29)	24.7 (0.97)	42.1 (1.66)	94.4 (3.72)	180.6 (7.11)	139.1 (5.48)	56.8 (2.24)	31.5 (1.24)	13.8 (0.54)	3.5 (0.14)	601.1 (23.68)
Average precipitation days (≥ 0.1 mm)	1.9	2.4	2.9	4.7	6.7	9.6	12.4	10.2	6.1	5.1	3.3	2.7	68
Average snowy days	3.1	2.5	0.9	0.2	0	0	0	0	0	0.1	1.8	3.2	11.8
Average relative humidity (%)	51	50	46	48	54	64	75	78	70	63	59	55	59
Mean monthly sunshine hours	171.7	178.4	225.3	239.5	269.0	218.4	185.5	202.2	211.4	198.6	162.8	164.9	2,427.7
Percentage possible sunshine	57	59	60	60	60	49	41	48	57	58	55	57	55
Source: China Meteorological Administration

== Administrative divisions ==
Fengrun District administers 3 subdistricts, 18 towns, and 2 townships.

=== Subdistricts ===
Fengrun District's 3 subdistricts are Taiping Road Subdistrict, Yanshan Road Subdistrict, and Gengyang Subdistrict.

=== Towns ===
Fengrun District's 17 towns are Fengrun, Rengezhuang, Zuojiawu, Quanhetou, Wangguanying, Huoshiying, Xinjuntun, Xiaozhanggezhuang, Fengdengwu, Lizhaozhuang, Baiguantun, Shigezhuang, Shaliuhe, Qishuzhuang, Yangguanlin, Yinchengpu, Changzhuang, and Jiangjiaying.

=== Townships ===
Fengrun District's 2 townships are Huanxizhuang Township and Liujiaying Township.

=== Former administrative divisions ===
Former administrative divisions that are now defunct include the towns of Laozhuangzi, Hancheng, and Chahe.

== Demographics ==
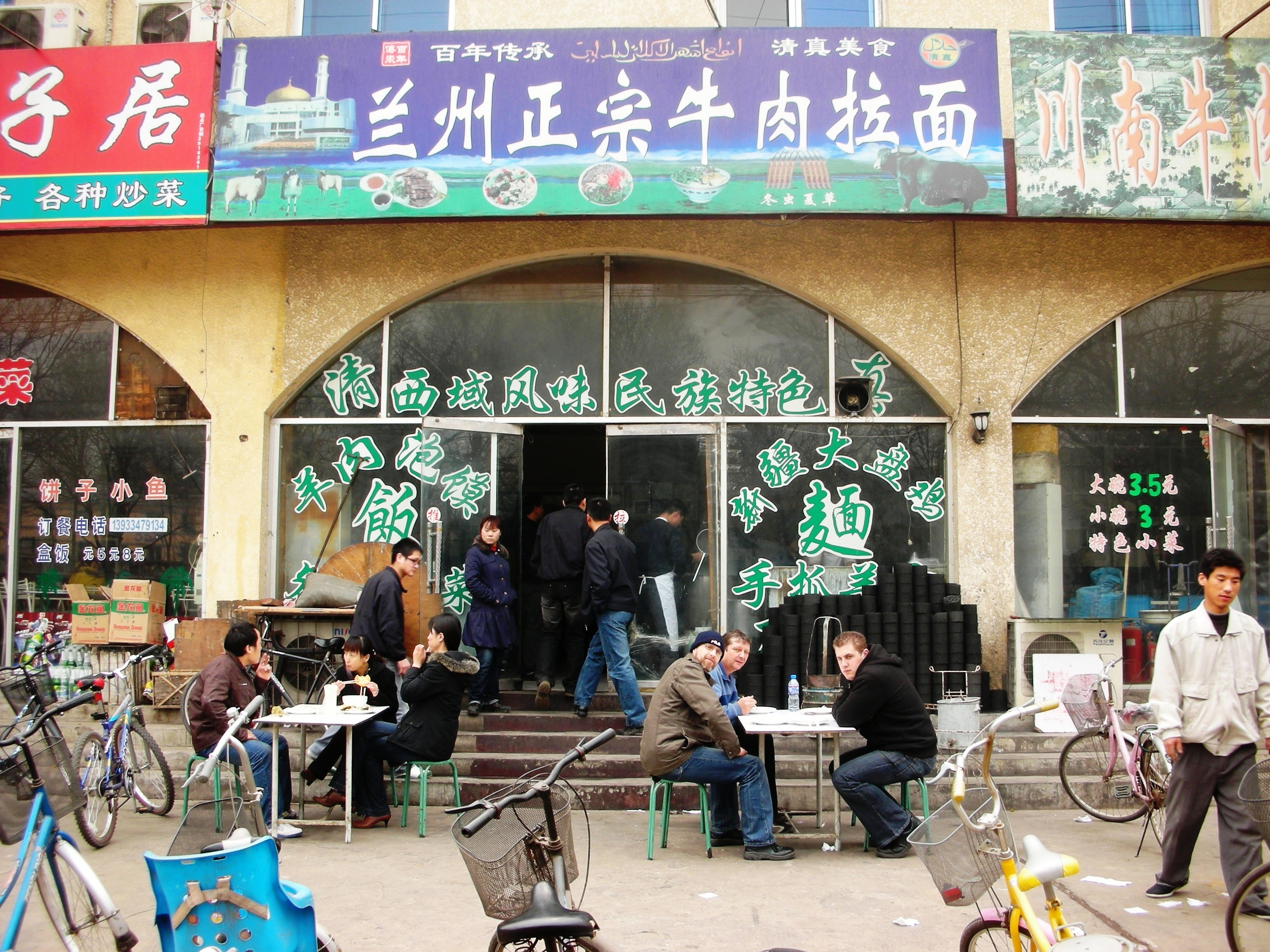
A Lanzhou-style halal restaurant in Fengrun District

Per the 2010 Chinese Census, Fengrun District has a population of 916,092. This is up significantly from the 2000 Chinese Census, when it had a recorded population of 715,835. This sharp increase can partially be attributed to annexation of additional land by Fengrun District in 2002, between the two censuses. Since 2010, the district has ceded part of its area in 2011, and again in 2013. A 2012 estimate put the district's population at 930,000. A 1996 estimate put Fengrun District's population at 689,000.

== Economy ==
CRRC Tangshan, a subsidiary of CRRC producing rolling stock, is headquartered in Fengrun District.

== Culture ==
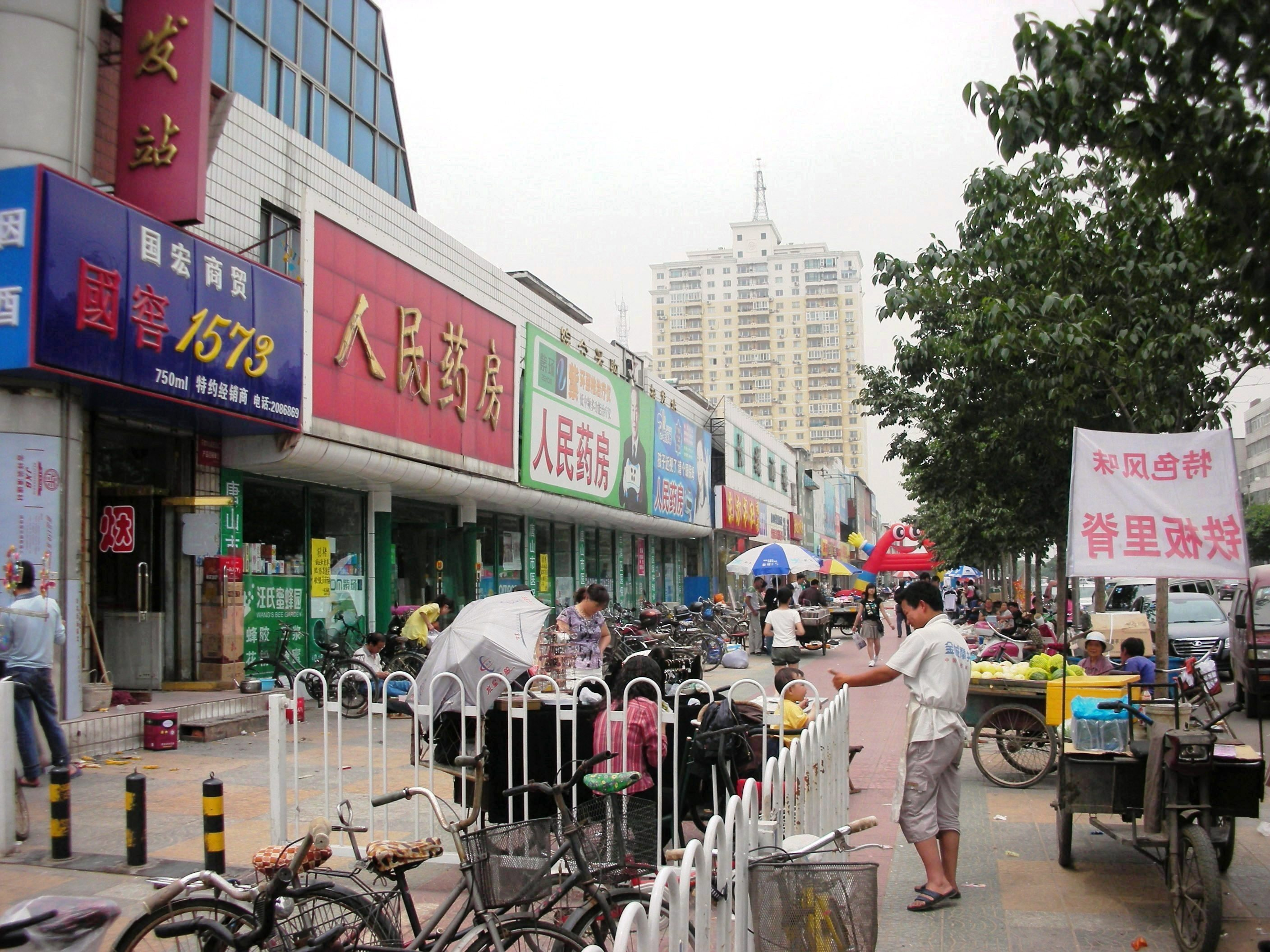
A street scene in Fengrun District

Major attractions within Fengrun District include the following:

- Tuyin City Ruins (土垠城遗址), which dates back to the time of the Han dynasty
- Dinghui Temple (定慧寺), which dates back to the Jin dynasty
- Tiangong Temple Pagoda, which dates back to the Liao dynasty
- Chezhou Mountain (车轴山)
- Panjiayu Revolution Memorial Hall (潘家峪革命纪念馆)

== Transportation ==
Major railways in Fengrun District include the Beijing–Qinhuangdao railway and the Tangshan–Zunhua railway (唐遵铁路; Táng Zūn Tiělù). National Highway 101 and National Highway 112 both run through Fengrun District.

== Notable people ==
- Liu Heqiao, a lieutenant general in the People's Liberation Army Air Forcewho served as commander of the Guangzhou Military Region Air Force from 1987 to 1993.
