= Douzhangzhuang =

Town in Wuqing District, Tianjin, China

Douzhangzhuang Town 豆张庄镇
- Town
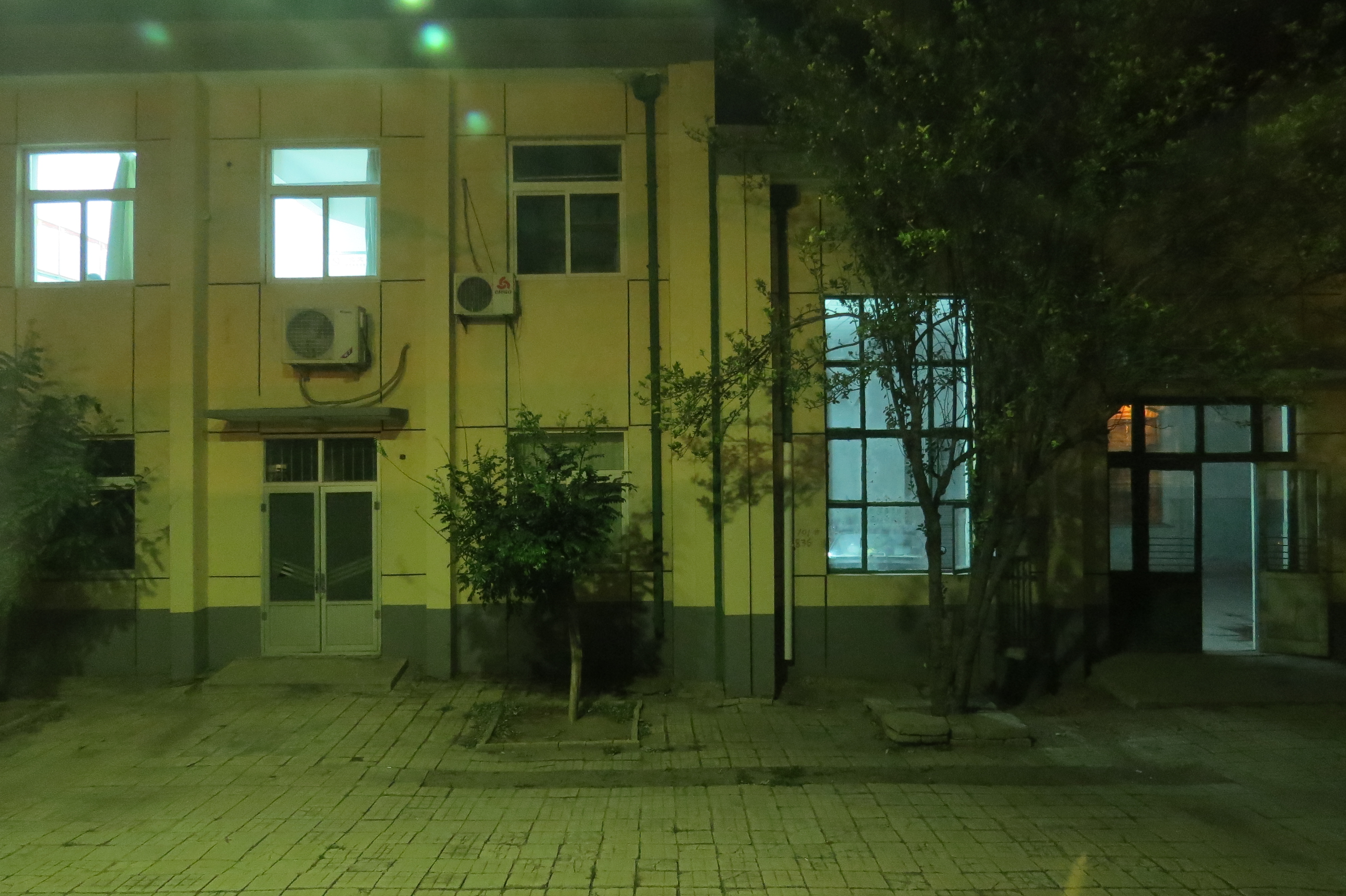
- Douzhangzhuang Railway Station within the town

- Location within Tianjin Location within China
- Coordinates: 39°23′55″N 116°56′30″E
- Country: China
- Municipality: Tianjin
- District: Wuqing
- Village-level Divisions: 1 community 18 villages

Area
  - Total: 69.79 km^{2} (26.95 sq mi)
- Elevation: 8 m (26 ft)

Population (2010)
  - Total: 23,421
  - Density: 335.6/km^{2} (869.2/sq mi)
- Time zone: UTC+8 (CST)
- Postal code: 301707
- Area code: 022

Douzhangzhuang Town (simplified Chinese: 豆张庄镇; traditional Chinese: 豆張莊鎮; pinyin: Dòuzhāngzhuāng Zhèn) is a town situated at the west side of Wuqing District, Tianjin, China. It shares border with Dongmaquan and Sicundian Towns in its north, Dongpuwa and Huangzhuang Subdistricts in its east, Chenzui and Huanghuadian Towns in its south, and Luofa Town in its west. In 2010, the town had 23,421 residents within its boundaries.

During the Ming Dynasty, the area was settled by a family with the surname Zhang, who specialized in the production of beans and vegetables. The settlement took the name Doujiaozhangzhuang (Chinese: 豆角张庄; lit. 'Bean Pod Zhang's Villa'), which was later simplified to Douzhangzhuang.

== Geography ==
Douzhangzhuang Town is situated along the Beijing–Shanghai Railway, at an altitude of 8 meters above the sea level.

== History ==
Timetable of Douzhangzhuang Town
Year	Status	Belong to
1961 - 1968	Douzhangzhuang People's Commune	Wuqing County, Hebei
1968 - 1973	Siyisi People's Commune	Wuqing County, Hebei
1973 - 1982	Siyisi People's Commune	Wuqing County, Tianjin
1982 - 1983	Douzhangzhuang People's Commune	Wuqing County, Tianjin
1983 - 2000	Douzhangzhuang Township	Wuqing County, Tianjin
2000 - 2013	Douzhangzhuang Township	Wuqing District, Tianjin
2013–present	Douzhangzhuang Town	Wuqing District, Tianjin

== Administrative divisions ==
As of 2022, Douzhangzhuang Town consisted of 19 subdivisions, including the following 1 residential community and 18 villages:

=== Residential community ===
- Xiangshuli (香墅里)

=== Villages ===
- Douzhangzhuang (豆张庄)
- Dongxinzhuang (东辛庄)
- Xixinzhuang (西辛庄)
- Gaochang (高场)
- Gongjiazhuang (龚家庄)
- Beichang (北场)
- Xiliuhang (西柳行)
- Xinanhang (西南行)
- Xizhou (西洲)
- Cizhou (茨洲)
- Laijiazhuang (来家庄)
- Juanzi (眷兹)
- Nanshuangmiao (南双庙)
- Zhongshuangmiao (中双庙)
- Beishuangmiao (北双庙)
- Zhouliying (周立营)
- Qingtuo (青坨)
- Shuanghe (双河)

== See also ==
- List of township-level divisions of Tianjin
