= Chenzui =

Town in Wuqing District, Tianjin, China

Chenzui Town 陈咀镇 Chenju Town
- Town
- Location within Tianjin Location within China
- Coordinates: 39°17′31″N 117°00′07″E
- Country: China
- Municipality: Tianjin
- District: Wuqing
- Village-level Divisions: 1 community 14 villages

Area
  - Total: 60.76 km^{2} (23.46 sq mi)
- Elevation: 9 m (30 ft)

Population (2010)
  - Total: 30,193
  - Density: 496.9/km^{2} (1,287/sq mi)
- Time zone: UTC+8 (CST)
- Postal code: 301741
- Area code: 022

Chenzui Town (simplified Chinese: 陈咀镇; traditional Chinese: 陳咀鎮; pinyin: Chénzuǐ Zhèn), or Chenju Town, is a town located in southern Wuqing District, Tianjin, China. It borders Douzhangzhuang and Huanghuadian Towns in its north, Huangzhuang Subdistrict in its east, Shuangjie Town in its south, as well as Chagugang and Shigezhuang Towns in its west. In the year 2010, It had a total of 30,193 inhabitants.

This town's name Chenzui (Chinese: 陈咀; lit. 'Chen's Mouth') refers to the Chen family that settled this area in the late Yuan Dynasty, and its location at the mouth of a river.

== Geography ==
Chenzui Town is located at the crossroad of Binhai-Baoding Expressway and Wujing Highway. The average elevation in Chenzui is 9 meters above the sea level.

== History ==
Chronology of Chenzui Town
Year	Status	Belong to
1958 - 1973	Chenzui People's Commune	Wuqing County, Hebei
1973 - 1983	Chenzui People's Commune	Wuqing County, Tianjin
1983 - 2000	Chenzui Township	Wuqing County, Tianjin
2000 - 2001	Chenzui Township	Wuqing District, Tianjin
2001–present	Chenzui Town	Wuqing District, Tianjin

== Administrative divisions ==
By the end of 2022, Chenzui Town was made up of 15 subdivisions, including 1 residential community and 14 villages. They are listed below:

=== Residential community ===
- Shengshi Haoting (盛世豪庭)

=== Villages ===
- Chenzui (陈咀)
- Yubakou Yicun
  (渔坝口一村)
- Yubakou Di'er
  (渔坝口第二)
- Yubakou Disan
  (渔坝口第三)
- Yubakou Disi
  (渔坝口第四)
- Dongxiaozhuang (东肖庄)
- Pangzhuang (庞庄)
- Aipuzhuang Diyi
  (艾蒲庄第一)
- Aipuzhuang Di'er
  (艾薄庄第二)
- Aipuzhuang Disan
  (艾薄庄第三)
- Lichang (李场)
- Xiaowang (小王村)
- Yangzhuang (杨庄)
- Dawangcun (大旺村)

== See also ==
- List of township-level divisions of Tianjin
