= Dawangguzhuang =

Town in Wuqing District, Tianjin, China

Dawangguzhuang Town 大王古庄镇
- Town
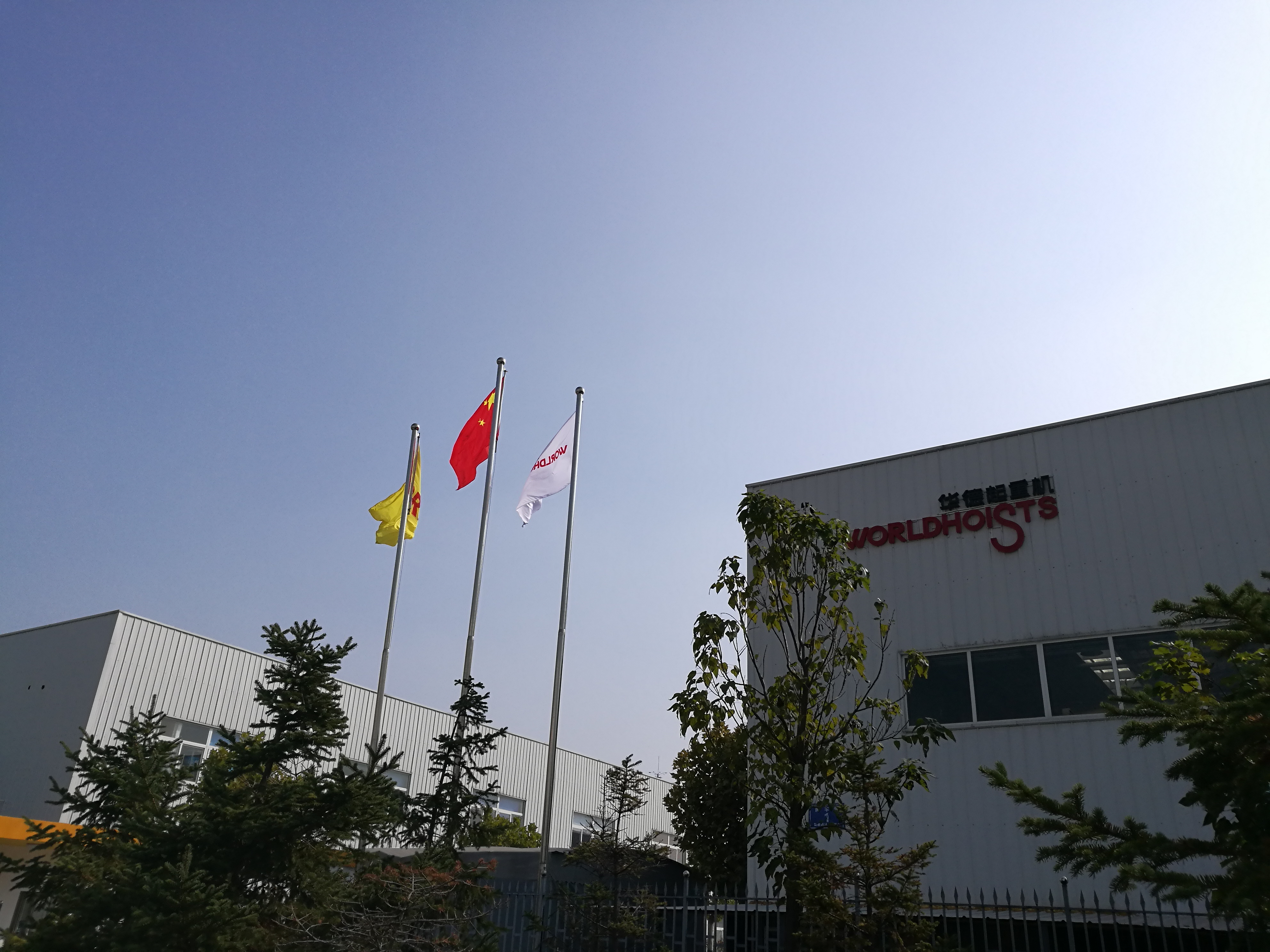
- Orit Cranes Factory within Dawangguzhuang

- Location within Tianjin Location within China
- Coordinates: 39°34′13″N 116°49′13″E
- Country: China
- Municipality: Tianjin
- District: Wuqing
- Village-level Divisions: 2 communities 15 villages

Area
  - Total: 48.75 km^{2} (18.82 sq mi)
- Elevation: 12 m (39 ft)

Population (2010)
  - Total: 25,061
  - Density: 514.1/km^{2} (1,331/sq mi)
- Time zone: UTC+8 (CST)
- Postal code: 301739
- Area code: 022

Dawangguzhuang Town (simplified Chinese: 大王古庄镇; traditional Chinese: 大王古莊鎮; pinyin: Dàwánggǔzhuāng Zhèn) is a town located inside of Wuqing District, Tianjin, China. It borders Yongledian and Gaocun Towns in the north, Baigutun Town in the east, Chengguan and Beiwang Towns in the south, and Yaohualu Subdistrict in the west. In 2010, the population of the town was 25,061.

In the early years of the Tang Dynasty, a local rebellion force constructed a fortified village named Wangguzhuang (Chinese: 王固庄; lit. 'Wang's Stronghold Villa') in the area. During the Qing Dynasty, the settlement was split into two village, with the larger settlement becoming Dawangguzhuang.

== Geography ==
Dawangguzhuang Town is situated on the south of Fenghe River, with the Beijing–Shanghai Expressway traversing through it. The average elevation of the town is 12 meters above the sea level.

== History ==
Timeline of Dawangguzhuang Town
Year	Status	Within
1958 - 1961	Part of Chengguan Hongqi People's Commune	Wuqing County, Hebei
1961 - 1973	Dawangguzhuang People's Commune	Wuqing County, Hebei
1973 - 1983	Dawangguzhuang People's Commune	Wuqing County, Tianjin
1983 - 2000	Dawangguzhuang Township	Wuqing County, Tianjin
2000 - 2001	Dawangguzhuang Township	Wuqing District, Tianjin
2001 - present	Dawangguzhuang Town	Wuqing District, Tianjin

== Administrative divisions ==
In 2022, Dawangguzhuang Town was made up of 2 residential communities and 15 villages. They are as follows:

=== Residential communities ===
- Taiyuandao (泰元道)
- Taifeng Jiayuan (泰丰家园)

=== Villages ===
- Songjiachang (宋家场)
- Zhangjiachang (张家场)
- Dongjiazhuang (董家庄)
- Qianhoushang (前侯尚)
- Lishangtun (利尚屯)
- Shuihuopu (水活铺)
- Niexinzhuang (聂辛庄)
- Daying (大营)
- Chengezhuang (陈各庄)
- Juchengbao (距城堡)
- Dingxinzhuang (丁辛庄)
- Nieying (聂营)
- Hangzhihuiying (韩指挥营)
- Zaolin (枣林)
- Beiliuzhuang (北刘庄)

== See also ==
- List of township-level divisions of Tianjin
