= Huanghuadian, Tianjin =

Town in Tianjin, China

Huanghuadian Town 黄花店镇
- Town
- Location within Tianjin Location within China
- Coordinates: 39°21′35″N 116°53′53″E
- Country: China
- Municipality: Tianjin
- District: Wuqing
- Village-level Divisions: 22 villages

Area
  - Total: 42.55 km^{2} (16.43 sq mi)
- Elevation: 10 m (33 ft)

Population (2010)
  - Total: 24,100
  - Density: 566/km^{2} (1,470/sq mi)
- Time zone: UTC+8 (CST)
- Postal code: 301708
- Area code: 022

Huanghuadian Town (simplified Chinese: 黄花店镇; traditional Chinese: 黃花店鎮; pinyin: Huánghuādiàn Zhèn) is a town situated on the west of Wuqing District, Tianjin, China. It shares border with Douzhangzhuang Town to its north, Chenzui Town to its east, Shigezhuang Town to its south, as well as Matou and Luofa Towns to its west. In 2010, Its population was 24,100.

The name Huanghuadian (Chinese: 黃花店; lit. 'Yellow Flowers Shop') is a corruption of Huanghoudian (Chinese: 皇后殿; lit. 'Queen Palace'), which refers to the palace in the area that served to imprison consorts who violated palace laws during the Liao Dynasty.

== Geography ==
Huanghuadian Town is mostly located on the southwestern bank of the Yongding River, at an altitude of 10 meters above the sea level.

== History ==
Timeline of Huanghuadian Town
Year	Status	Within
1940 - 1949	Huanghuadian Township	Wuqing County, Hebei
1949 - 1950	12th District	Wuqing County, Hebei
1950 - 1952	8th District	Wuqing County, Hebei
1952 - 1957	12th District	Wuqing County, Hebei
1957 - 1958	Huanghuadian Township	Wuqing County, Hebei
1958 - 1973	Huanghuadian People's Commune	Wuqing County, Hebei
1973 - 1983	Huanghuadian People's Commune	Wuqing County, Tianjin
1983 - 1999	Huanghuadian Township	Wuqing County, Tianjin
1999 - 2000	Huanghuadian Town	Wuqing County, Tianjin
2000 - present	Huanghuadian Town	Wuqing District, Tianjin

== Administrative divisions ==
At the end of 2022, Huanghuadian Town was divided into the following 22 villages:

- Yijie (一街)
- Erjie (二街)
- Sanjie (三街)
- Sijie (四街)
- Wujie (五街)
- Liuzhuang (刘庄)
- Yanzhuang (晏庄)
- Yushizhuang (鱼市庄)
- Xihouzhuang (西后庄)
- Xitianzhuang (西田庄)
- Dongtianzhuang (东田庄)
- Cuihuying (崔胡营)
- Jiying (冀营)
- Baoying (包营)
- Yangying (杨营)
- Huying (胡营)
- Zhenying (甄营)
- Baliqiao (八里桥)
- Shaoqidi (邵七堤)
- Luogupan (罗古判)
- Jiekou (解口)
- Maying (马营)

== See also ==
- List of township-level divisions of Tianjin
