= Chagugang =

Town in Wuqing District, Tianjin, China

Chagugang Town 汊沽港镇 Chagujiang Town
- Town
- Location within Tianjin Location within China
- Coordinates: 39°15′25″N 116°56′47″E
- Country: China
- Municipality: Tianjin
- District: Wuqing
- Village-level Divisions: 2 community 14 villages

Area
  - Total: 56.93 km^{2} (21.98 sq mi)
- Elevation: 11 m (36 ft)

Population (2010)
  - Total: 44,843
  - Density: 787.7/km^{2} (2,040/sq mi)
- Time zone: UTC+8 (CST)
- Postal code: 301721
- Area code: 022

Chagugang Town (simplified Chinese: 汊沽港镇; traditional Chinese: 汊沽港鎮; pinyin: Chàgūgǎng Zhèn), also known as Chagujiang Town by its locals, is a town located in western side of Wuqing District, Tianjin, China. It shares border with Shigezhuang Town to its north, Chenzui and Shuangkou Towns to its east, Wangqingtuo Town to its south, and Geyucheng Town to its west. The town's population is 44,843 as of 2010.

The name Chagugang (Chinese: 汊沽港; lit. 'Branching Creek Port') came from the river network within the town.

== Geography ==
Chagugang Town is located on the banks of Zhonghong Ancient Channel, with the Beijing–Shanghai Expressway and National Highway 104 running north–south through it. It reaches an average altitude of 11 meters above the sea level.

== History ==
History of Chagugang Town
Year	Status	Under
1939 - 1948	Part of 7th and 8th Districts	Wuqing County, Hebei
1948 - 1949	Part of 3rd and 4th Districts	Wuqing County, Hebei
1949 - 1950	Part of 10th and 9th Districts	Wuqing County, Hebei
1950 - 1952	Part of 9th District	Wuqing County, Hebei
1952 - 1957	Part of 13th District	Wuqing County, Hebei
1957 - 1958	Chagugang Township	Wuqing County, Hebei
1958 - 1973	Part of Wangqingtuo People's Commune	Wuqing County, Hebei
1973 - 1974	Part of Wangqingtuo People's Commune	Wuqing County, Tianjin
1974 - 1983	Chagugang People's Commune	Wuqing County, Tianjin
1983 - 1997	Chagugang Township	Wuqing County, Tianjin
1997 - 2000	Chagugang Town	Wuqing County, Tianjin
2000–present	Chagugang Town	Wuqing District, Tianjin

== Administrative divisions ==
As of the year 2022, Chagugang Town had direct jurisdiction over 16 subdivisions, of them 2 were residential communities and 14 were villages. Below is a list of the subdivisions:

=== Residential communities ===
- Xinyuan (新苑)
- Zhonghao Zhicheng (中浩智城)

=== Villages ===
- Xiaowangbu (小王堡)
- Lengjiabu (冷家堡)
- Xiaoliubu (小刘堡)
- Yuanjiabu (苑家堡)
- Beiliuzi (北柳子)
- Dongwangbu (东王堡)
- Dawangbu (大王堡)
- Yijie (一街)
- Erjie (二街)
- Sanjie (三街)
- Liudaokou (六道口)
- Daliubu (大刘堡)
- Huliuzi (胡柳子)
- Xixiaozhuang (西肖庄)

== See also ==
- List of township-level divisions of Tianjin
