= Daqigezhuang =

Daqigezhuang 大齐各庄镇
- Town
- Dàqí Gèzhuāng Zhèn
- Location in Hebei Location in China
- Coordinates: 39°33′36″N 118°17′15″E
- Country: People's Republic of China
- Province: Hebei
- Prefecture-level city: Tangshan
- District: Fengnan

Area
  - Total: 40.19 km^{2} (15.52 sq mi)

Population (2010)
  - Total: 13,581
  - Density: 337.9/km^{2} (875/sq mi)
- Time zone: UTC+8 (China Standard)

Daqigezhuang (Chinese: 大齐各庄镇; pinyin: Dàqí Gèzhuāng Zhèn) is a town located in Fengnan District, Tangshan, Hebei, China. According to the 2010 census, Daqigezhuang had a population of 13,581, including 6,974 males and 6,607 females. The population was distributed as follows: 1,947 people aged under 14, 10,341 people aged between 15 and 64, and 1,293 people aged over 65.

== See also ==
- List of township-level divisions of Hebei
