= Chengguan, Tianjin =

Town in Tianjin, China

Chengguan Town 城关镇
- Town
- Location within Tianjin Location within China
- Coordinates: 39°31′38″N 116°52′05″E
- Country: China
- Municipality: Tianjin
- District: Wuqing
- Village-level Divisions: 30 villages

Area
  - Total: 56.21 km^{2} (21.70 sq mi)
- Elevation: 10 m (33 ft)

Population (2010)
  - Total: 27,050
  - Density: 481.2/km^{2} (1,246/sq mi)
- Time zone: UTC+8 (CST)
- Postal code: 301712
- Area code: 022

Chengguan Town (simplified Chinese: 城关镇; traditional Chinese: 城關鎮; pinyin: Chéngguān Zhèn) is a town situated in the western side of Wuqing District, Tianjin, China. It shares border with Dawangguzhuang and Baigutun Towns in the north, Sicundian Town in the east, Dongmaquan Town in the south, and Beiwang Town in the west. As of 2010, it had a total population of 27,050.

The name Chengguan (Chinese: 城关; lit. 'City Pass') came from the town's historic location as the administrative center of Wuqing County during the Ming and Qing Dynasties.

== Geography ==
Chengguan Town lies on Tianjin's western border with Langfang, Hebei. Cuilang Highway runs east–west through it. The town has an average elevation of 10 meters above the sea level.

== History ==
Timeline of Chengguan Town
| Year | Status | Within |
|---|---|---|
| 1957 - 1973 | Chengguan Township | Wuqing County, Hebei |
| 1973 - 1988 | Chengguan Township | Wuqing County, Tianjin |
| 1988 - 2000 | Chengguan Town | Wuqing County, Tianjin |
| 2000–present | Chengguan Town | Wuqing District, Tianjin |

== Administrative divisions ==
By 2022, Chengguan Town was composed of the following 30 villages:

- Dongjie (东街)
- Beijie (北街)
- Xijie (西街)
- Lirenjie (里仁街)
- Xinanjie (西南街)
- Dongnanjie (东南街)
- Nanyuan (南园)
- Yangzhuang (杨庄)
- Lizhuang (李庄)
- Xuzhuang (许庄)
- Yinyao (尹窑)
- Tiangutun (田古屯)
- Caoci (草茨)
- Shazhuang (沙庄)
- Dongzhangying (东张营)
- Xizhangying (西张营)
- Houzhuang (后庄)
- Xiaotun (小屯)
- Wulidian (五里店)
- Liulintun (柳林屯)
- Xihangzhuang (西韩庄)
- Baozhuang (薄庄)
- Yuanxinzhuang (袁辛庄)
- Yangzhonghe (杨仲河)
- Wuliangmiao (无梁庙)
- Nantaoyuan (南桃园)
- Xiaotaoyuan (小桃园)
- Dataoyuan (大桃园)
- Balizhuang (八里庄)
- Shahetun (沙河屯)

== See also ==
- List of township-level divisions of Tianjin
