= Dongmaquan, Tianjin =

Town in Tianjin, China

Dongmaquan Town 东马圈镇
- Town
- Location within Tianjin Location within China
- Coordinates: 39°26′52″N 116°50′10″E
- Country: China
- Municipality: Tianjin
- District: Wuqing
- Village-level Divisions: 1 community 13 villages

Area
  - Total: 36.96 km^{2} (14.27 sq mi)
- Elevation: 9 m (30 ft)

Population (2010)
  - Total: 15,850
  - Density: 428.8/km^{2} (1,111/sq mi)
- Time zone: UTC+8 (CST)
- Postal code: 301717
- Area code: 022

Dongmaquan Town (simplified Chinese: 东马圈镇; traditional Chinese: 東馬圈鎮; pinyin: Dōngmǎquān Zhèn) is a town situated on the west edge of Wuqing District, Tianjin, China. It shares border with Beiwang Township and Chengguan Town to the north, Sicundian Town to the east, Douzhangzhuang Town to the south, and Luofa Town to the west. Its population was 15,850 in 2010.

Its name Dongmaquan (Chinese: 东马圈; lit. 'Eastern Stable') refers to its historical function as a place for raising horses during the Liao Dynasty.

== Geography ==
Dongmaquan Town is on Tianjin's western boundary with Hebei, at an altitude of 9 meters above the sea level. Dadong Highway crosses through it.

== History ==
History of Dongmaquan Town
Year	Status	Part of
1961 - 1973	Dongmaquan People's Commune	Wuqing County, Hebei
1973 - 1983	Dongmaquan People's Commune	Wuqing County, Tianjin
1983 - 1995	Dongmaquan Township	Wuqing County, Tianjin
1995 - 2000	Dongmaquan Town	Wuqing County, Tianjin
2000 - present	Dongmaquan Town	Wuqing District, Tianjin

== Administrative divisions ==
At the end of 2022, Dongmaquan Town had 14 subdivisions, consisting of the following one residential community and 13 villages:

=== Residential community ===
- Hejun Xinjiayuan (和骏新家园)

=== Villages ===
- Dongmaquan (东马圈)
- Ximafang (西马房)
- Damoutun (大谋屯)
- Xiaomoutun (小谋屯)
- Tianjiawu (田家务)
- Zhangbiaofa (张标垡)
- Bancheng (半城)
- Guangshan (广善)
- Changzhuang (常庄)
- Xiliuzhuang (西刘庄)
- Xiaonanwang (小南旺)
- Anbiaofa (安标垡)
- Dongbiaofa (董标垡)

== See also ==
- List of township-level divisions of Tianjin
