= Liushuquan =

Liushuquan 柳树𨟠镇
- Town
- Location in Hebei
- Coordinates: 39.352°N 118.111°E
- Country: China
- Province: Hebei
- Prefecture-level city: Tangshan
- District: Fengnan
- Established date: 1985
- Villages: 14

Area
  - Total: 105.3 km^{2} (40.7 sq mi)

Population (2009)
  - Total: 29,000
  - Density: 280/km^{2} (710/sq mi)
- Time zone: UTC+8 (China Standard)
- Postal code: 063306
- Website: http://www.fengnan.gov.cn/html/xwzx/xzdt/lsqzz/

Liushuquan
- Traditional Chinese: 柳樹𨟠鎮
- Simplified Chinese: 柳树𨟠镇
- Literal meaning: Willow Tree [Quan] Town
Transcriptions
Standard Mandarin
- Hanyu Pinyin: Liǔshùquān Zhèn

Liushuquan (simplified Chinese: 柳树𨟠镇; traditional Chinese: 柳樹𨟠鎮; pinyin: Liǔshùquān(quàn) Zhèn) is a town in Fengnan County, Tangshan, Hebei near the coast of the Bo Sea to the immediate northeast of the Port of Tianjin and the immediate northwest of the Port of Tangshan Caofeidian (曹妃甸港). Liushuquan Town is named after a village (which is now divided into three villages) founded in the northern part of the town in 1662. Liushuquan has a reputation as a "land of fish and rice where you can easily find a Holocentridae fish or a Tianjin Purple Crab".

== Overview ==
Liushuquan Town has advantageous geography, location, transportation and natural resources as well as a history of settlement stretching back to the Ming Dynasty. The town has a total cultivated land area of 75000 mu as well as 11000 mu of water-based agriculture. The town is located in the coastal plain of the Bo Sea, 24 km from Tangshan. The town is north of G0111 Qinhuangdao–Binzhou Expressway. Fengjian road (丰碱线) runs through the middle of the town from north to south. Hejian road, QiuLiu highways cross through the town. There are four rivers, Dadou River (大陡河), Sand River (沙河), Dongpaigan (东排干) and Xipaigan (西排干) which flow into the Bo Sea.

Due to the inconvenience involved in typing the character 𨟠 (quān), it is often rendered as its components '瞿阝' (a combination of 瞿 and 阝)('柳树瞿阝镇') or substituted by the homophonous character 酄('柳树酄镇') or 圈('柳树圈镇'). The town has been mentioned as an example of the usage of the character 𨟠 (瞿阝quān) in several editions of the Contemporary Chinese Dictionary. There are several sources which give the pronunciation quàn for this character.

== History ==
=== Ming Dynasty ===
==== Zhengde ====
In 1506 (the first year of the Zhengde era 正德元年), the Xihe (West River) village was established. The village is named after the shallow river to the west of the village. The West River itself is so named because it is west of the Dadou River. According to tradition, the West River was formerly a canal that reached Beijing. The village was originally named Xihedian (West River Store 西河店).

=== Qing Dynasty ===
==== Shunzhi ====
In 1644, the villages of Liu De Zhuang (刘德庄) and Xiaxin Zhuang (夏新庄) were established around the collapse of the Ming Dynasty. Liu De Zhuang takes its name from Liu De (刘德), a member of the Ming court who left the capital and took residence in the area. Xiaxin Zhuang was established in the same year to the south of Liu De Zhuang. Its name derives from reference to the depressed land around the Bo Sea.

In 1650, the village of Hanjiaquan (Han Family Quan) was established on the western bank of the Dadou River. Its name derives from settlers of the Han family, and reference to the geographical feature 'quan'. (该地为低洼滩草圈与水圈地带)

==== Kangxi ====
In 1662 (the first year of the Kangxi era 清康熙元年), the village of Liushuquan (Willow Tree Quan) for which the town of Liushuquan is named was established by migrants from Hangu, Tianjin (present-day Binhai) who planted willow trees on the border of their village. This village was later divided into Liushuquan Bei (North Liushuquan), Liushuquan Dong (East Liushuquan) and Liushuquan Qian.

In 1671 (the tenth year of the Kangxi era 康熙十年), Jimen (戟门) was established on the western bank of the Dadou River.

In 1682 (the twenty first year of the Kangxi era 康熙二十一年), Laopu (老铺) was established on the eastern bank of the Dadou River. Laopu's name references the old pu of settler Li Hongshen (李洪深).

==== Qianlong ====
In 1736 (the first year of the Qianlong era 清乾隆元年), Li Fu Zhuang (李富庄) was established to the southwest of Liu De Zhuang. The name of the village is derived from the Li family and the rich natural resources of the village.

In 1755 (the twentieth year of the Qianlong era 清乾隆二十年), Aoli (廒里 Áolǐ) was established south of Jimen on the Dadou River. The village's name is derived from the practice of boiling seawater (熬盐 áoyán) which is a homophone of áo 廒.

=== People's Republic of China ===
In 1954, Laopu Township (老铺乡) was established.

In August 1958, Laopu Township was made into a people's commune (老铺公社).

In 1968, Sangou (三沟 Third Channel) was established. The area was originally part of a marsh which was divided into four channels. Settlers from nearby Jimen migrated east to the former location of the third channel, and their new village used the name of the former channel.

In 1982, the name of Laopu Commune was changed to Liushuquan Commune (柳树瞿阝公社).

In 1984, Liushuquan Commune was changed into a township(乡).

In 1985, Liushuquan Township was elevated to a town (镇).

In 1997, it had a total area of 103 km2, a population of 25,000, and was made up of 18 village-level(村) divisions.

In 2005, Qianjin (Progress), Dongfeng (Eastern Wind), and Hongxing (Red Star) were combined into First West River Village. Xiangyang and Shengli were combined into Second West River Village. Hongqi and Yonghong were combined into Third West River Village.

== Geography ==
=== Administrative divisions ===
There are 14 (previously 18) villages (行政村) in Liushuquan:

Name	Chinese (S)	Hanyu Pinyin	Location
Liushuquanbei	柳树𨟠北村	Liǔshùquānběi Cūn	39.352°N 118.111°E
Liushuquandong	柳树𨟠东村	Liǔshùquāndōng Cūn	39.352°N 118.111°E
Liushuquanqian	柳树𨟠前村	Liǔshùquānqián Cūn	39.349°N 118.113°E
Lifuzhuang	李富庄村	Lǐfùzhuāng Cūn	39.297°N 118.066°E
Hanjiaquan	韩家𨟠村	Hánjiāquān Cūn	39.333°N 118.110°E
Liudezhuang	刘德庄村	Liúdézhuāng Cūn	39.308°N 118.085°E
Xiaxinzhuang	夏新庄村	Xiàxīnzhuāng Cūn	39.335°N 118.125°E
Aoli	廒里村	Áolǐ Cūn	39.292°N 118.102°E
Laopu	老铺村	Laopu	39.304°N 118.116°E
Jimen	戟门村	Jǐmén Cūn	39.301°N 118.104°E
Sangou	三沟村	Sāngōu Cūn	39.312°N 118.146°E
Xiheyicun	西河一村	Xīhéyīcūn	
-former Qianjin	前进	Qiánjìn	
-former Dongfeng	东风	Dōngfēng	39.342°N 118.057°E
-former Hongxing	红星	Hóngxīng	
Xihe'ercun	西河二村	Xīhé'èrcūn	
-former Xiangyang	向阳	Xiàngyáng	
-former Shengli	胜利	Shènglì	
Xihesancun	西河三村	Xīhésāncūn	39.345°N 118.052°E
-former Hongqi	红旗	Hóngqí	
-former Yonghong	永红	Yǒnghóng	

== Demographics ==
Historical population
Year	Pop.	±% p.a.
1997	25,000	—
2002	27,300	+1.78%
2009	29,000	+0.87%
2009
