= Liu Heqiao =

Chinese lieutenant general (1931–2022)

- 刘鹤翘

Commander of the Guangzhou Military Region Air Force
- In office February 1987 – January 1993
- Preceded by: Wu Jiyuan
- Succeeded by: Yang Zhenggang

Personal details
- Born: 1931 Fengrun County, Hebei, China
- Died: 2022 (aged 90–91) Guangzhou, Guangdong, China
- Party: Chinese Communist Party
- Education: PLA Air Force Command College

Military service
- Allegiance: People's Republic of China
- Branch/service: People's Liberation Army Air Force
- Years of service: 1948–1993
- Rank: Lieutenant general
- Battles/wars: Chinese Civil War

Chinese name
- Simplified Chinese: 刘鹤翘
- Traditional Chinese: 劉鶴翹
Transcriptions
Standard Mandarin
- Hanyu Pinyin: Liú Hèqiào

Liu Heqiao (Chinese: 刘鹤翘; 1931 – 22 December 2022) was a lieutenant general in the People's Liberation Army Air Force of China who served as commander of the Guangzhou Military Region Air Force from 1987 to 1993. He was a representative of the 13th and 14th National Congress of the Chinese Communist Party.

== Biography ==
Liu was born in Fengrun County (now Fengrun District of Tangshan), Hebei, in 1931.

Liu joined the Chinese Communist Party (CCP) in 1947, and enlisted in the People's Liberation Army (PLA) in 1948. He served in the Chinese Civil War and engaged in the Battle of Zunhua. After the establishment of the Communist State, he graduated from the People's Liberation Army Air Force Aviation School in 1952 and the PLA Air Force Command College in 1964, respectively. In October 1976, he became deputy commander of the Guangzhou Military Region, and held that office until October 1982. In February 1987, he was commissioned as commander of the Guangzhou Military Region Air Force, succeeding Wu Jiyuan. He attained the rank of lieutenant general (zhongjiang) in 1988.

On 22 December 2022, Liu died in Guangzhou, Guangdong, at the age of 91.

Military offices
Preceded by Wu Jiyuan	Commander of the Guangzhou Military Region Air Force; 1987–1993	Succeeded by Yang Zhenggang
