= Fengdengwu =

Fengdengwu 丰登坞镇
- Town
- Fēngdēngwù Zhèn
- Location in Hebei Location in China
- Coordinates: 39°41′57″N 117°54′58″E
- Country: People's Republic of China
- Province: Hebei
- Prefecture-level city: Tangshan
- District: Fengrun

Area
  - Total: 68.65 km^{2} (26.51 sq mi)

Population (2010)
  - Total: 37,744
  - Density: 549.8/km^{2} (1,424/sq mi)
- Time zone: UTC+8 (China Standard)

Fengdengwu (Chinese: 丰登坞镇; pinyin: Fēngdēngwù Zhèn) is a town located in Fengrun District, Tangshan, Hebei, China. According to the 2010 census, Fengdengwu had a population of 37,744, including 19,215 males and 18,529 females. The population was distributed as follows: 6,081 people aged under 14, 27,669 people aged between 15 and 64, and 3,994 people aged over 65.

== See also ==
- List of township-level divisions of Hebei
