= Gengyang Subdistrict =

Gengyang Subdistrict 浭阳街道
- Urban Subdistrict
- Gēngyáng Jiēdào
- Location in Hebei Location in China
- Coordinates: 39°49′40″N 118°07′16″E
- Country: People's Republic of China
- Province: Hebei
- Prefecture-level city: Tangshan
- District: Fengrun

Area
  - Total: 10.33 km^{2} (3.99 sq mi)

Population (2010)
  - Total: 77,236
- Time zone: UTC+8 (China Standard)

Gengyang Subdistrict (Chinese: 浭阳街道; pinyin: Gēngyáng Jiēdào) is an urban subdistrict located in Fengrun District, Tangshan, Hebei, China. According to the 2010 census, Gengyang Subdistrict had a population of 77,236, including 39,053 males and 38,183 females. The population was distributed as follows: 12,196 people aged under 14, 59,365 people aged between 15 and 64, and 5,675 people aged over 65.

== See also ==
- List of township-level divisions of Hebei
