= Sicundian =

Town in Tianjin, China

Sicundian Town 泗村店镇
- Town
- Location within Tianjin Location within China
- Coordinates: 39°28′42″N 116°57′17″E
- Country: China
- Municipality: Tianjin
- District: Wuqing
- Village-level Divisions: 1 community 9 villages

Area
  - Total: 54.82 km^{2} (21.17 sq mi)
- Elevation: 8 m (26 ft)

Population (2010)
  - Total: 17,247
  - Density: 314.6/km^{2} (814.8/sq mi)
- Time zone: UTC+8 (CST)
- Postal code: 301735
- Area code: 022

Sicundian Town (simplified Chinese: 泗村店镇; traditional Chinese: 泗村店鎮; pinyin: Sìcūndiàn Zhèn) is a town in the western portion of Wuqing District, Tianjin, China. It borders Baigutun Town in its north, Damengzhuang and Nancaicun Towns in its east, Dongpuwa Subdistrict and Douzhangzhuang Town in its south, as well as Dongmaquan and Chengguan Towns in its west. In 2010, the town had a total population of 17,247.

The name Sicundian (Chinese: 泗村店; lit. 'Si Village Shop') was taken from the Sishui County in Shandong, where the early settlers of the region originated.

== Geography ==
Sicundian Town is located to the west of Longfeng River, with the Jingjintang Expressway and Jinghu Expressway passing through it. The town has an average elevation of 8 meters above the sea level.

== History ==
Timetable of Sicundian Town
Years	Status	Part of
1961 - 1973	Sicundian People's Commune	Wuqing County, Hebei
1973 - 1983	Sicundian People's Commune	Wuqing County, Tianjin
1983 - 1995	Sicundian Township	Wuqing County, Tianjin
1995 - 2000	Sicundian Town	Wuqing County, Tianjin
2000 - present	Sicundian Town	Wuqing District, Tianjin

== Administrative divisions ==
As of the year 2022, Sicundian Town had jurisdiction over the following 10 subdivisions:

=== Residential Community ===
- Shanshuicheng (山水城)

=== Villages ===
- Sihouzhuang (泗后庄)
- Yaoshang (窑上)
- Qizhuang (齐庄)
- Xiaochenzhuang (小陈庄)
- Jiuxian (旧县)
- Cangshang (仓上)
- Nanmafang (南马房)
- Housuo (后所)
- Taiziwu (太子务)

== See also ==
- List of township-level divisions of Tianjin
