= Baigutun =

Town in Wuqing District, Tianjin, China

Baigutun Town 白古屯镇
- Town
- Location within Tianjin Baigutun Town (China)
- Coordinates: 39°32′57″N 116°54′11″E
- Country: China
- Municipality: Tianjin
- District: Wuqing
- Village-level Divisions: 21 villages

Area
  - Total: 51.21 km^{2} (19.77 sq mi)
- Elevation: 9 m (30 ft)

Population (2010)
  - Total: 21,443
  - Density: 418.7/km^{2} (1,084/sq mi)
- Time zone: UTC+8 (CST)
- Postal code: 301738
- Area code: 022

Baigutun Town (simplified Chinese: 白古屯镇; traditional Chinese: 白古屯鎮; pinyin: Báigǔtún Zhèn), is a town located in the northwest of Wuqing District, Tianjin, China. It shares border with Gaocun Town in its north, Hexiwu and Damengzhuang Towns in its east, Sicundian Town in its south, as well as Chengguan and Dawangguzhuang Towns in its west. The town had a population of 21,443 as of 2010.

== Geography ==
Baigutun Town is situated at the western shore of Longfeng and Fenghe Rivers, at an altitude of 9 meters above the sea level.

== History ==
Chronology of Baigutun Town.
| Year | Status | Under |
|---|---|---|
| 1958 – 1961 | Administered by Chengguan Hongqi People's Commune | Wuqing County, Hebei |
| 1961 – 1973 | Dongmafang People's Commune | Wuqing County, Hebei |
| 1973 – 1983 | Dongmafang People's Commune | Wuqing County, Tianjin |
| 1983 – 1984 | Dongmafang Township | Wuqing County, Tianjin |
| 1984 – 2000 | Baigutun Township | Wuqing County, Tianjin |
| 2000 – 2013 | Baigutun Township | Wuqing District, Tianjin |
| 2013 – present | Baigutun Town | Wuqing District, Tianjin |

== Administrative divisions ==
By the end of 2022, Baigutun Town has the following 21 villages:

- Dongmafang (东马房)
- Xihuangxinzhuang (西黄辛庄)
- Qiuguzhuang (邱古庄)
- Yanggeda (杨疙疸)
- Houtuncun (后屯村)
- Gengzhuangcun (耿庄村)
- Xuzhuang (徐庄)
- Hepingzhuang (和平庄)
- Xinfangzi (新房子)
- Daweizhuang (大魏庄)
- Xiaoweizhuang (小魏庄)
- Xiaotiancun (小天村)
- Xiaozhaozhuang (小赵庄)
- Quliuzhuang (屈刘庄)
- Baigutun (白古屯)
- Fucun (富村)
- Shaoziying (稍子营)
- Dazhaozhuang (大赵庄)
- Luotuoquan (骆驼圈)
- Tonglin (桐林)
- Hancun (韩村)

== See also ==
- List of township-level divisions of Tianjin
