= Baiguantun =

Baiguantun 白官屯镇
- Town
- Báiguāntún Zhèn
- Location in Hebei Location in China
- Coordinates: 39°47′32″N 117°57′31″E
- Country: People's Republic of China
- Province: Hebei
- Prefecture-level city: Tangshan
- District: Fengrun

Area
  - Total: 64.40 km^{2} (24.86 sq mi)

Population (2010)
  - Total: 40,393
  - Density: 627.2/km^{2} (1,624/sq mi)
- Time zone: UTC+8 (China Standard)

Baiguantun (Chinese: 白官屯镇; pinyin: Báiguāntún Zhèn) is a town located in Fengrun District, Tangshan, Hebei, China. According to the 2010 census, Baiguantun had a population of 40,393, including 20,500 males and 19,893 females. The population was distributed as follows: 6,361 people aged under 14, 29,713 people aged between 15 and 64, and 4,319 people aged over 65.

== See also ==
- List of township-level divisions of Hebei
