= Wangqingtuo =

Town in Wuqing District, Tianjin, China

Wangqingtuo Town 王庆坨镇
- Town
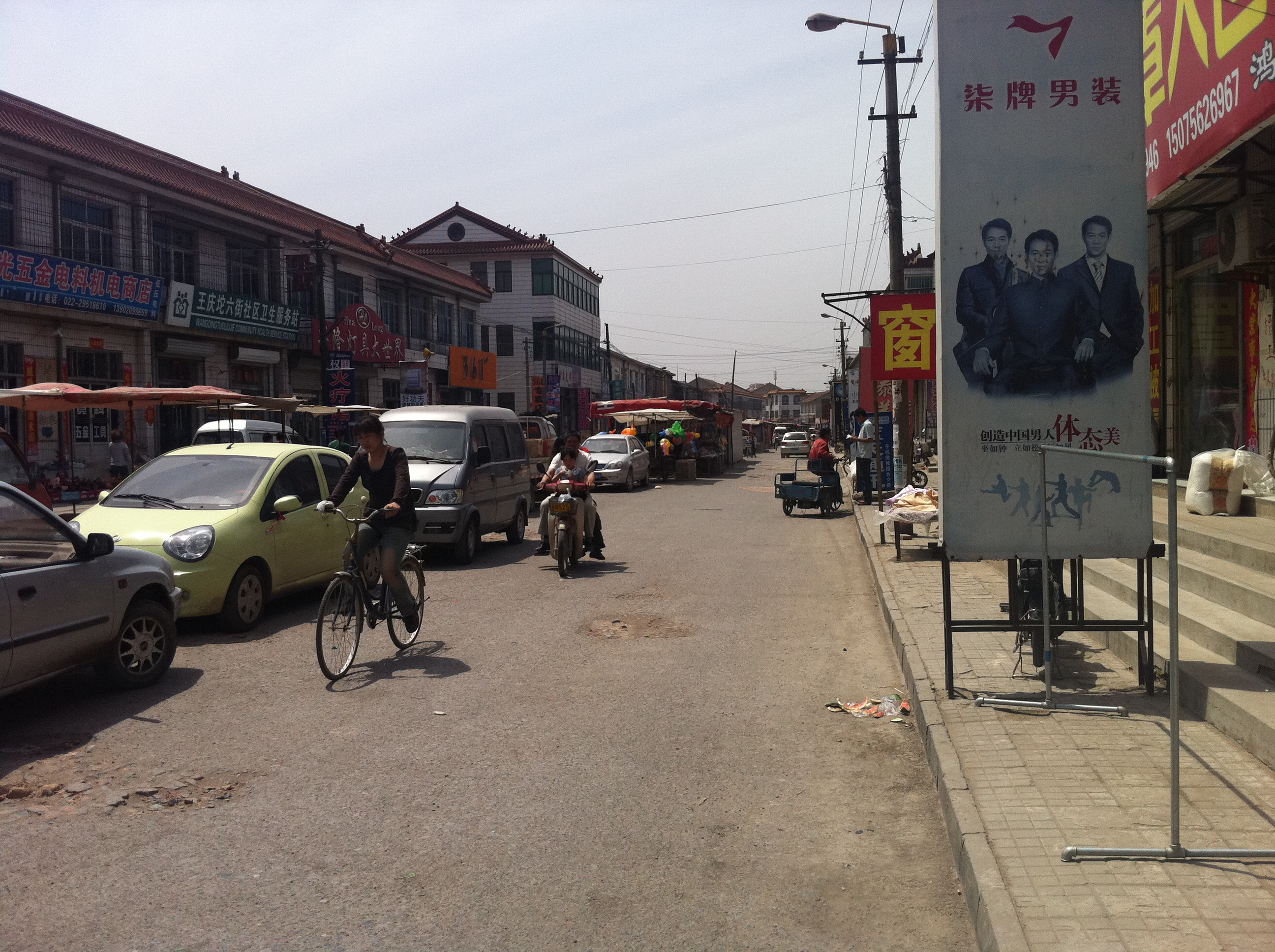
- Sijie Village in Wangqingtuo Town

- Location within Tianjin Location within China
- Coordinates: 39°10′51″N 116°53′55″E
- Country: China
- Municipality: Tianjin
- District: Wuqing
- Village-level Divisions: 2 community 22 villages

Area
  - Total: 56.11 km^{2} (21.66 sq mi)
- Elevation: 9 m (30 ft)

Population (2010)
  - Total: 45,016
  - Density: 802.3/km^{2} (2,078/sq mi)
- Time zone: UTC+8 (CST)
- Postal code: 301713
- Area code: 022

Wangqingtuo Town (simplified Chinese: 王庆坨镇; traditional Chinese: 王慶坨鎮; pinyin: Wángqìngtuó Zhèn) is a town located in the southwest of Wuqing District, Tianjin, China. It borders Geyucheng and Chagugang Towns to its north, Shuangkou and Yangliuqing Towns to its east, Yangfengang Town to its south, and Donggugang Town to its west. The town had a census population of 45,016 as of 2010.

== Geography ==
Wangqingtuo Town lies on the southeast of the Zhonghong Ancient Channel, with Beijing–Shanghai Expressway and Rongwu Expressway passing through it. The town is located at an altitude of 9 meters above the sea level.

== History ==
Timeline of Wangqingtuo's history
Year	Status	Belongs to
1957–1958	Wangqingtuo Township	Wuqing County, Hebei
1958–1973	Wangqingtuo People's Commune	Wuqing County, Hebei
1973–1983	Wangqingtuo People's Commune	Wuqing County, Tianjin
1983–1988	Wangqingtuo Township	Wuqing County, Tianjin
1988–2000	Wangqingtuo Town	Wuqing County, Tianjin
2000–present	Wangqingtuo Town	Wuqing District, Tianjin

== Administrative divisions ==
As of 2022, Wangqingtuo Town had direct jurisdiction over 24 subdivisions, consisting of these 2 residential communities and 22 villages:

=== Residential communities ===
- Xinjiayuan (鑫嘉园)
- Mingshi Jiayuan (名仕佳苑)

=== Villages ===
- Yijie (一街)
- Erjie (二街)
- Sanjie (三街)
- Sijie (四街)
- Wujie (五街)
- Liujie (六街)
- Qijie (七街)
- Bajie (八街)
- Jiujie (九街)
- Daogouzi (道沟子)
- Wang'erdian (王二淀)
- Sihezhuang (四合庄)
- Dafankou (大范口)
- Xiaofankou (小范口)
- Zhengjialou (郑家楼)
- Daliuzi (大柳子)
- Fuxingzhuang (复兴庄)
- Da Sanhezeng (大三河曾)
- Xiao Sanhezeng (小三河曾)
- Zhangjiadi (张家地)
- Caijiadi (蔡家地)
- Youzhangbu (尤张堡)

== See also ==
- List of township-level divisions of Tianjin
