= Xugezhuang =

Subdistrict in Fengnan, Tangshan, China

Coordinates: 39°34′N 118°05′E

Xugezhuang is a former village (simplified Chinese: 胥各庄; traditional Chinese: 胥各莊; pinyin: Xūgèzhuāng) and modern town (胥各庄镇; Xūgèzhuāng Zhèn) of Fengnan District in Hebei, China.

It was the terminus of the second railway to be constructed in China after the abortive Woosung Railway in Shanghai. The six-mile Kaiping Tramway opened to traffic in 1881 and ran from the collieries at Tangshan to Xugezhuang (then known as Hsuokochuang), whence a canal connected it to Lutai and the river network between Beijing and Tianjin. It eventually grew into the Imperial Railways of North China and the modern Jingshan and Jingha Railways.

== See also ==
- Claude W. Kinder
- List of township-level divisions of Hebei
