= Chahe, Hebei =

Chahe 岔河镇
- Town
- Location in Hebei
- Coordinates: 39°35′8″N 118°2′11″E
- Country: People's Republic of China
- Province: Hebei
- Prefecture-level city: Tangshan
- District: Fengnan District
- Time zone: UTC+8 (China Standard)

Chahe (Chinese: 岔河; pinyin: Chàhé) is a town in Fengnan District, Tangshan, Hebei. As of 2020, it administers the following 26 villages:

- Chahe First Village (岔河一村)
- Chahe Second Village (岔河二村)
- Yangyikoutou First Village (杨义口头一村)
- Yangyikoutou Second Village (杨义口头二村)
- Yangyikoutou Third Village (杨义口头三村)
- Meyizhuang Village (么义庄村)
- Songjiakoutou Village (宋家口头村)
- Liuzhuangzi Village (刘庄子村)
- Puzhuangzi Village (蒲庄子村)
- Gaotuo Village (高坨村)
- Xiaodaodi Village (小稻地村)
- Zhangfuzhuang Village (张富庄村)
- Zhuxinzhuang Village (朱新庄村)
- Sunzhuangzi Village (孙庄子村)
- Dongzhuangzi Village (冬庄子村)
- Zhaojiakoutou Village (赵家口头村)
- Cuizhuangzi Village (崔庄子村)
- Wanggezhuang First Village (王各庄一村)
- Wanggezhuang Second Village (王各庄二村)
- Wanggezhuang Third Village (王各庄三村)
- Wanggezhuang Fourth Village (王各庄四村)
- Sanshenzhuang Village (三神庄村)
- Sishenzhuang First Village (四神庄一村)
- Sishenzhuang Second Village (四神庄二村)
- Daronggezhuang Village (大荣各庄村)
- Xiaoronggezhuang Village (小荣各庄村)
