= Shigezhuang, Wuqing =

Town in Tianjin, China

Shigezhuang Town 石各庄镇
- Town
- Location within Tianjin Location within China
- Coordinates: 39°17′55″N 116°54′00″E
- Country: China
- Municipality: Tianjin
- District: Wuqing
- Village-level Divisions: 1 community 12 villages

Area
  - Total: 45.02 km^{2} (17.38 sq mi)
- Elevation: 12 m (39 ft)

Population (2010)
  - Total: 23,309
  - Density: 517.7/km^{2} (1,341/sq mi)
- Time zone: UTC+8 (CST)
- Postal code: 301718
- Area code: 022

Shigezhuang Town (simplified Chinese: 石各庄镇; traditional Chinese: 石各莊鎮; pinyin: Shígèzhuāng Zhèn) is a town inside of Wuqing District, Tianjin, China. It shares a border with Huanghuadian Town to its north, Chenzui Town to its east, Chagugang Town to its south, as well as Geyucheng and Matou Towns to its west. In 2010, Its population was 23,309.

During the Ming dynasty, ten families from southern China migrated and settled in this region. As a result, the area came to be known as Shijiazhuang (Chinese: 十家庄; lit. 'Ten Families Villa'). It later evolved into Shigezhuang (Chinese: 石各庄; lit. 'Shi Family's Villa') in the Qing dynasty.

== Geography ==
Shigezhuang Town is situated at Tianjin's western boundary with Hebei, with Beijing–Shanghai Expressway and Beijing–Taipei Expressway passing through it. It reaches an average altitude of 12 meters above the sea level.

== History ==
Timetable of Shigezhuang Town
Year	Status	Under
1949 - 1950	12th District	Wuqing County, Hebei
1950 - 1953	9th District	Wuqing County, Hebei
1953 - 1958	Shigezhuang Township	Wuqing County, Hebei
1958 - 1961	Huanghuadian Weixing People's Commune	Wuqing County, Hebei
1961 - 1973	Shigezhuang People's Commune	Wuqing County, Hebei
1973 - 1983	Shigezhuang People's Commune	Wuqing County, Tianjin
1983 - 1995	Shigezhuang Township	Wuqing County, Tianjin
1995 - 2000	Shigezhuang Town	Wuqing County, Tianjin
2000 - present	Shigezhuang Town	Wuqing District, Tianjin

== Administrative divisions ==
At the end of 2022, Shigezhuang Town consisted of the following one residential community and 12 villages:

=== Residential community ===
- Xudong Xinyuan (旭东欣苑)

=== Villages ===
- Shidong (石东)
- Shinan (石南)
- Shibei (石北)
- Shixi (石西)
- Dingziwu (定子务)
- Xinanzhuang (西南庄)
- Aodong (敖东)
- Aonan (敖南)
- Aobei (敖北)
- Aoxi (敖西)
- Lianggezhuang (梁各庄)
- Ligezhuang (李各庄)

== See also ==
- List of township-level divisions of Tianjin
