= Liu Xinyun =

Chinese politician

- 刘新云

Vice Governor of Shanxi
- In office January 2018 – April 2021
- Governor: Lou Yangsheng; Lin Wu

Head of Shanxi Public Security Department
- In office January 2018 – April 2021
- Preceded by: Yang Jinghai

Director of the Public Security Ministry Network Security Bureau
- In office December 2014 – January 2018

Personal details
- Born: September 1962 (age 64) Zibo, Shandong, China
- Party: Chinese Communist Party (1984–2021; expelled)
- Education: Shandong Police College

Chinese name
- Traditional Chinese: 劉新雲
- Simplified Chinese: 刘新云
Transcriptions
Standard Mandarin
- Hanyu Pinyin: Liú Xīnyún

Liu Xinyun (Chinese: 刘新云; born September 1962) is a former Chinese politician who spent most of his career in his home-province Shandong. He was investigated by China's top anti-graft agency in April 2021. In September 2022, he was sentenced to 14 years in prison for bribery and abuse of power. Previously he served as vice governor of Shanxi and head of Shanxi Public Security Department. Liu is one of several senior-ranking police officers to be investigated in a years-long anti-corruption battle started by Chinese Communist Party (CCP) general secretary Xi Jinping that swept China's domestic security apparatus.

== Career ==
Liu was born in Zibo, Shandong, in September 1962. After the resumption of college entrance examination, he was admitted to Shandong Police College in September 1979. After graduating in July 1981, he was assigned to Zibo Public Security Bureau. He rose to become deputy head in July 1997 and political commissar in December 2002. In December 2005, he was transferred to Heze and appointed assistant mayor and head of the Public Security Bureau. He was assigned to the similar position of the capital city Jinan in December 2011. He became director of the Network Security Bureau of the Public Security Ministry and director of the National Network and Information Security Information Notification Center in December 2014, and served until January 2018, when he was transferred from his job in Beijing to central Shanxi province as vice governor of Shanxi and head of the Public Security Department.

== Downfall ==
On April 9, 2021, he was put under investigation for alleged "serious violations of discipline and laws" by the Central Commission for Discipline Inspection (CCDI), the CCP's internal disciplinary body, and the National Supervisory Commission, the highest anti-corruption agency of China. On August 15, he was expelled from the CCP and dismissed from public office. On August 26, he has been arrested on charges of bribery and abuse of power as per a decision made by the Supreme People's Procuratorate. On October 9, he was indicted on charges of bribery and abuse of power by the Langfang Municipal People's Procuratorate.

On September 21, 2022, Liu Xinyun was sentenced to 14 years in prison for bribery, abuse of power, and damaging the interests of the people. He was also fined one million yuan.

Government offices
Preceded by Yang Jinghai	Head of Shanxi Public Security Department; 2018–2021	Incumbent
