= Fengnan, Tangshan =

Fengnan 丰南区
- District
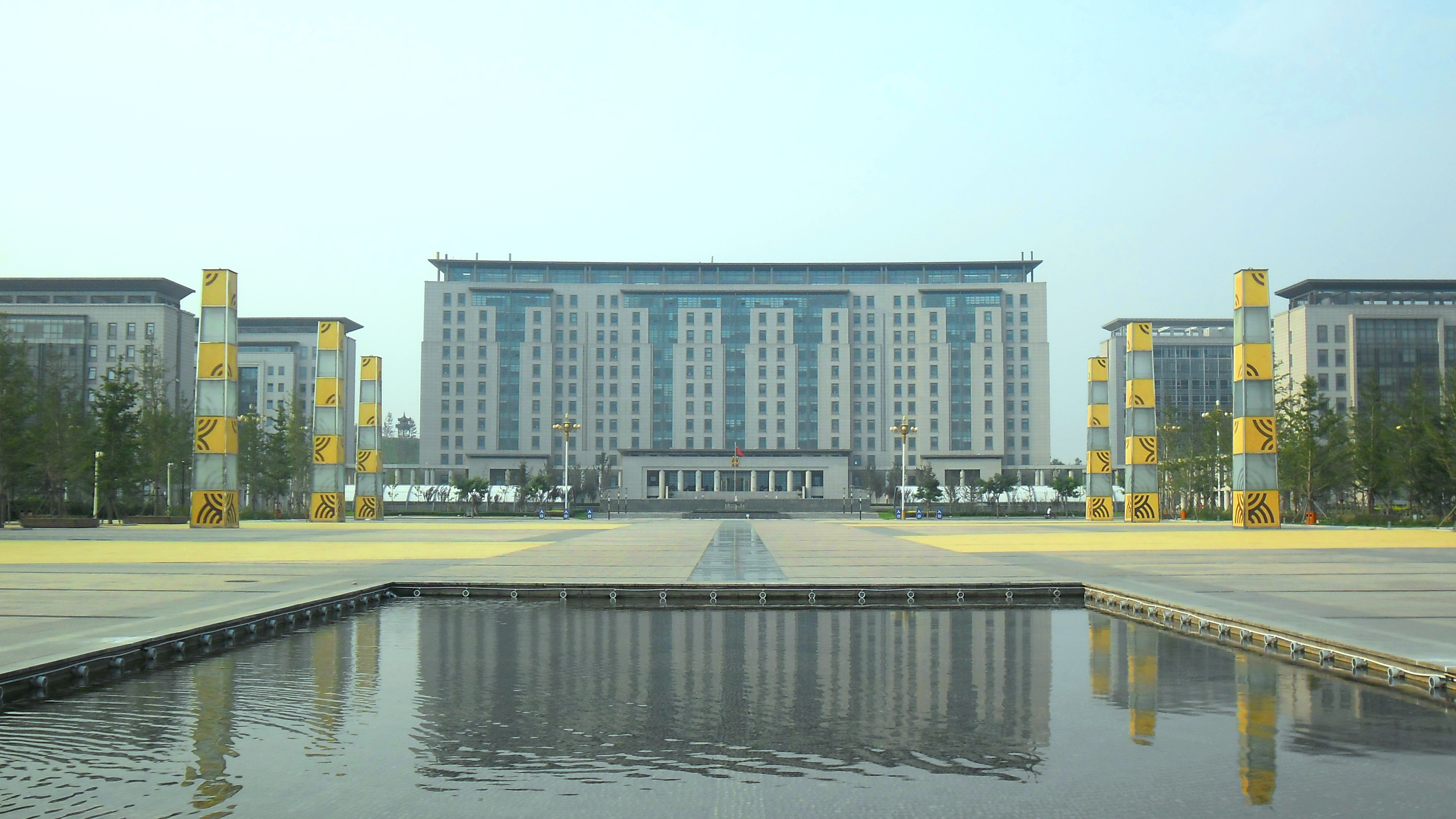
- A view of People's Square and the Fengnan District government building

- Location in Hebei
- Coordinates: 39°34′34″N 118°05′06″E
- Country: People's Republic of China
- Province: Hebei
- Prefecture-level city: Tangshan

Area
  - Total: 1,305.19 km^{2} (503.94 sq mi)

Population (2012)
  - Total: 530,000
  - Density: 410/km^{2} (1,100/sq mi)
- Time zone: UTC+8 (China Standard)

Fengnan District (simplified Chinese: 丰南区; traditional Chinese: 豐南區; pinyin: Fēngnán Qū) is a district of Tangshan, Hebei, China on the coast of the Bohai Sea and bordering Tianjin to the west. The district spans an area of 1,305.19 square kilometres (503.94 mi^{2}), and has a population of approximately 530,000 as of 2012.

== Toponymy ==
Fengnan District was first established as Fengnan County in 1946, when it was carved out of the southern portions of Fengrun County and Luanzhou County. Its name, which literally means "south of Feng", was derived from this.

== History ==
During the time of the Shang dynasty, the area of present-day Fengnan District belonged to the state of Guzhu. During the time of the Zhou dynasty, the area was part of the state of Yan. In the Qin dynasty, the area was split between Youbeiping Commandery and Liaoxi Commandery. During the Han dynasty, it was administered by Tuyin County (simplified Chinese: 土垠县; traditional Chinese: 土垠縣) and Changcheng County (simplified Chinese: 昌城县; traditional Chinese: 昌城縣). During the Sui dynasty the area belonged to Lulong County (simplified Chinese: 卢龙县; traditional Chinese: 盧龍縣) and Wuzhong County (simplified Chinese: 无终县; traditional Chinese: 無終縣). During the Tang dynasty, the area belonged to Yutian County (simplified Chinese: 玉田县; traditional Chinese: 玉田縣) and Shicheng County (simplified Chinese: 石城县; traditional Chinese: 石城縣). During the reign of Emperor Zhangzong of the Jin dynasty, the area was placed under the administration of Fengrun County (simplified Chinese: 丰润县; traditional Chinese: 豐潤縣) and Shicheng County. It remained as such until the Ming dynasty, when it was reorganized under Fengrun County and Luanzhou County (simplified Chinese: 滦州县; traditional Chinese: 灤州縣). Fengnan County was finally established as its own administrative division in 1946, when it was carved out of the southern portions of Fengrun County and Luanzhou County.

=== People's Republic of China ===
In July 1955, Fengnan County was abolished, and merged back into Fengrun County. Fengnan County was re-established in June 1961, and was put under the jurisdiction of Tangshan. Tangshan was upgraded from a prefecture to a prefecture-level city in 1983. On May 5, 1994, Fengnan was reorganized as a county-level city. On February 1, 2002, Fengnan was reorganized from a county-level city to a district.

== Geography ==
Fengnan District is located within the prefecture-level city of Tangshan, in the eastern part of Hebei. It is bordered by Fengrun District, Lubei District, Lunan District, Kaiping District and Guye District to the north, the Bohai Sea to the south, Luannan County and Caofeidian District to the east, and the Hangu Administration Zone (Chinese: 汉沽管理区) and Tianjin's Ninghe District to the west.

Fengnan District has a coastline of 23.5 kilometres (14.6 mi) along the Bohai Sea. The district's terrain is largely flat, and generally higher in the northeast and lower in the southwest. The Dou River, the Sha River, and the Mei River (Chinese: 煤河; lit. 'Coal River') run through the district. The Jintang Canal (Chinese: 津唐运河) also runs through Fengnan District.

=== Climate ===
Climate data for Fengnan, elevation 9 m (30 ft), (1991–2020 normals, extremes 1981–present)
Month	Jan	Feb	Mar	Apr	May	Jun	Jul	Aug	Sep	Oct	Nov	Dec	Year
Record high °C (°F)	13.0 (55.4)	19.3 (66.7)	28.3 (82.9)	32.4 (90.3)	36.1 (97.0)	38.8 (101.8)	40.2 (104.4)	37.1 (98.8)	34.8 (94.6)	31.5 (88.7)	21.5 (70.7)	14.1 (57.4)	40.2 (104.4)
Mean daily maximum °C (°F)	1.8 (35.2)	5.6 (42.1)	12.4 (54.3)	20.2 (68.4)	26.3 (79.3)	29.7 (85.5)	31.0 (87.8)	30.3 (86.5)	26.6 (79.9)	19.5 (67.1)	10.3 (50.5)	3.2 (37.8)	18.1 (64.5)
Daily mean °C (°F)	−4.3 (24.3)	−0.8 (30.6)	6.0 (42.8)	13.7 (56.7)	20.0 (68.0)	24.0 (75.2)	26.4 (79.5)	25.5 (77.9)	20.8 (69.4)	13.4 (56.1)	4.6 (40.3)	−2.3 (27.9)	12.3 (54.1)
Mean daily minimum °C (°F)	−9.0 (15.8)	−5.8 (21.6)	0.6 (33.1)	7.9 (46.2)	14.1 (57.4)	19.0 (66.2)	22.5 (72.5)	21.5 (70.7)	15.9 (60.6)	8.2 (46.8)	0.0 (32.0)	−6.5 (20.3)	7.4 (45.3)
Record low °C (°F)	−25.6 (−14.1)	−21.0 (−5.8)	−13.2 (8.2)	−4.2 (24.4)	3.1 (37.6)	8.0 (46.4)	15.2 (59.4)	12.1 (53.8)	3.2 (37.8)	−4.9 (23.2)	−11.9 (10.6)	−17.3 (0.9)	−25.6 (−14.1)
Average precipitation mm (inches)	2.9 (0.11)	5.0 (0.20)	6.7 (0.26)	23.3 (0.92)	41.0 (1.61)	76.1 (3.00)	168.9 (6.65)	128.3 (5.05)	52.0 (2.05)	31.3 (1.23)	13.4 (0.53)	3.8 (0.15)	552.7 (21.76)
Average precipitation days (≥ 0.1 mm)	1.9	2.5	2.7	4.8	6.5	9.3	11.2	9.6	5.7	4.3	3.0	2.3	63.8
Average snowy days	2.7	2.4	0.9	0.1	0	0	0	0	0	0	1.5	2.9	10.5
Average relative humidity (%)	55	54	50	51	56	66	76	78	70	64	62	58	62
Mean monthly sunshine hours	180.2	184.5	232.2	244.9	269.1	228.9	195.5	211.6	217.9	207.5	169.5	167.5	2,509.3
Percentage possible sunshine	60	61	62	61	60	51	44	50	59	61	57	58	57
Source: China Meteorological Administrationall-time August high

== Administrative divisions ==
Fengnan District administers 1 subdistrict, 14 towns, and 1 township.

The district's sole subdistrict is Qingnianlu Subdistrict (青年路街道).

The district's 14 towns are Xugezhuang (胥各庄镇), Xiaoji (小集镇), Huanggezhuang (黄各庄镇), Xige (西葛镇), Daxinzhuang (大新庄镇), Qianying (钱营镇), Tangfang (唐坊镇), Wanglanzhuang (王兰庄镇), Liushuquan (柳树𨟠镇), Heiyanzi (黑沿子镇), Daqigezhuang (大齐各庄镇), Chahe (岔河镇), Nansunzhuang (南孙庄镇), and Dongtianzhuang (东田庄镇).

The district's sole township is Jianzigu Township (尖字沽乡).

== Demographics ==
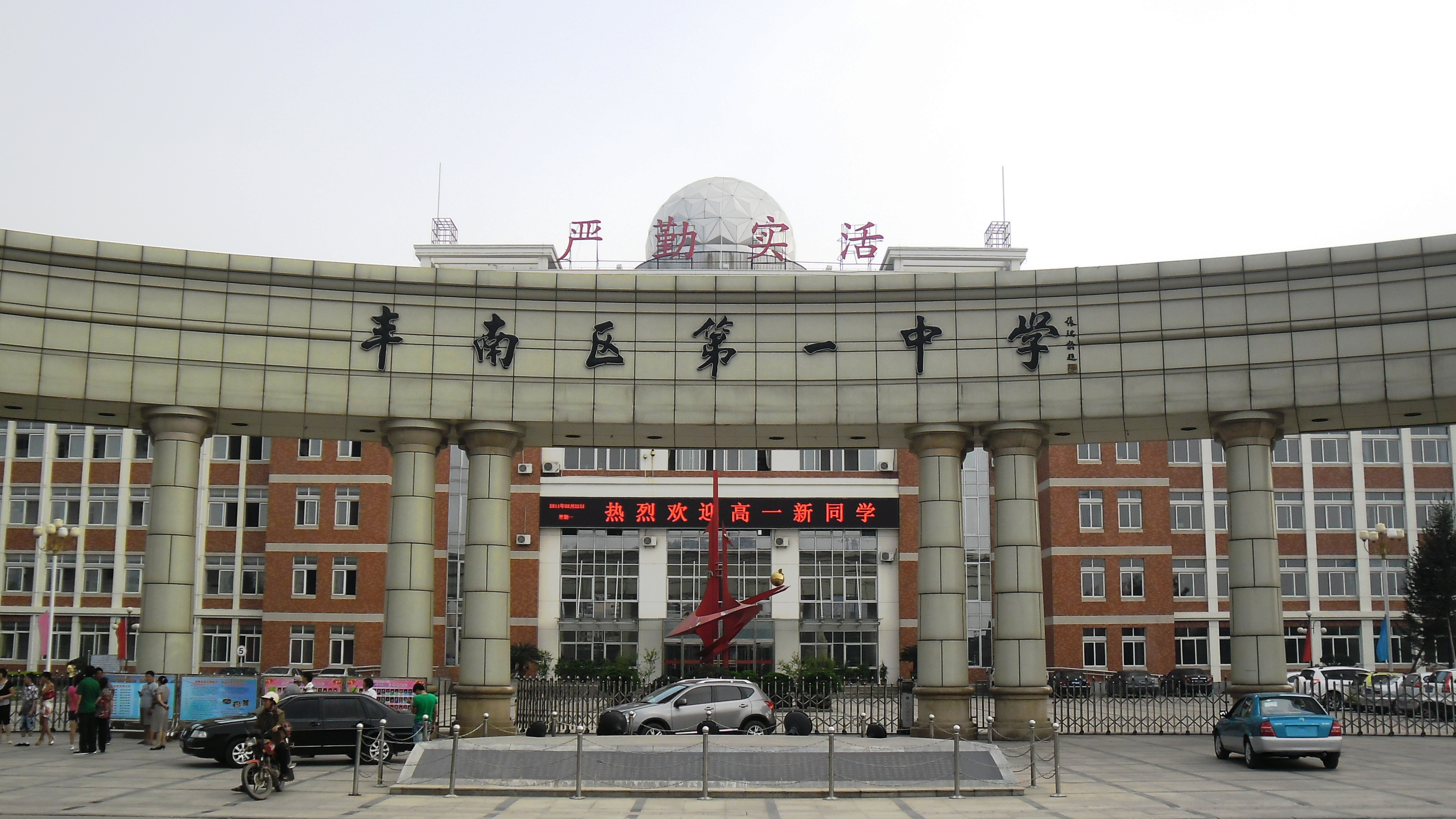
A view of Fengnan District First Middle School

As of 2012, Fengnan District has an estimated population of 530,000. Per the 2010 Chinese Census, the district had a population of 595,467, up from the 550,872 recorded in the 2000 Chinese Census. A 1996 estimate put the district's population at 513,000.

== Economy ==
Fengnan District has significant natural deposits of coal and salt.

== Transportation ==
The Beijing–Harbin railway runs through the district.

Major expressways that run through Fengnan District include the G25 Changchun–Shenzhen Expressway, China National Highway 205, and the Tiangang Expressway.
