= Sun Lijun =

Chinese former politician and police officer

- 孙力军

Vice Minister Public Security
- In office 28 March 2018 – 8 May 2020
- Minister: Zhao Kezhi

Personal details
- Born: 13 January 1969 (age 57) Shanghai, China
- Party: Chinese Communist Party (1997–2021; expelled)
- Education: University of New South Wales

Chinese name
- Simplified Chinese: 孙力军
- Traditional Chinese: 孫力軍
Transcriptions
Standard Mandarin
- Hanyu Pinyin: Sūn Lìjūn

Sun Lijun (Chinese: 孙力军; born 13 January 1969) is a former Chinese politician and police officer. He was investigated by the Chinese Communist Party's anti-graft agency in April 2020 and was given the death sentence with reprieve for bribery and corruption in September 2022. Sun Lijun was affiliated with a group of other corrupt officials associated with Jiang Zemin.

Previously he served as vice-minister of Public Security and vice-president of the China Law Society. Prior to that, he served as director of the First Bureau of Ministry of Public Security, handling domestic political security. And he served as the ministry's director of the Hong Kong, Macao and Taiwan Affairs Office and a deputy director of the 610 Office, which was in charge of suppressing Falun Gong practitioners. Sun became the second official at provincial or ministerial level to be investigated by the anti-corruption watchdog in 2020, after Zhang Zhinan, former vice governor of east China's Fujian province.

== Career ==
Sun was born in Shanghai on 13 January 1969. He entered the workforce in September 1988, and joined the Chinese Communist Party (CCP) in December 1997. He successively served as deputy director of the Foreign Affairs Office of Shanghai Municipal Health Bureau, deputy director of the Foreign Affairs Office of Shanghai People's Government, deputy director of the General Office of the Ministry of Public Security, member of the Party Committee of the Ministry of Public Security, director of the 26th Bureau of the First Bureau, deputy director of the 610 Office of the Central Committee, director of the Hong Kong, Macao and Taiwan Affairs Office of the Ministry of Public Security. On March 28, 2018, he was promoted to become deputy minister and a member of the Party Committee of the Ministry of Public Security. During the COVID-19 pandemic, he went to Wuhan to supervise the epidemic prevention and control work as a member of the Central Leading Group for Coronavirus Pneumonia Outbreak.

== Downfall ==
On April 19, 2020, he has been placed under investigation for serious violations of laws and regulations by the Central Commission for Discipline Inspection (CCDI), the party's internal disciplinary body, and the National Supervisory Commission, the highest anti-corruption agency of China. His colleague, Meng Hongwei, was sacked for graft in October 2018. On September 30, 2021, he was expelled from the CCP and removed from public office. On November 4, he was detained by the Supreme People's Procuratorate.

On July 8, 2022, he stood trial at the Intermediate People's Court of Changchun on charges of taking bribes. Prosecutors accused Sun of taking advantage of his different positions between 2008 and 2018 to seek profits for various companies and individuals in business favours, government jobs and promotions. In return, he accepted money and property worth over 646 million yuan ($95.74 million). On September 23, he received a suspended death sentence that could be commuted to life in prison after two years, with no possibility of parole. He was also deprived of political rights for life and all his properties were also confiscated.
