= Huangzhuang Subdistrict, Tianjin =

Subdistrict of Tianjin, China

Huangzhuang Subdistrict 黄庄街道
- Subdistrict
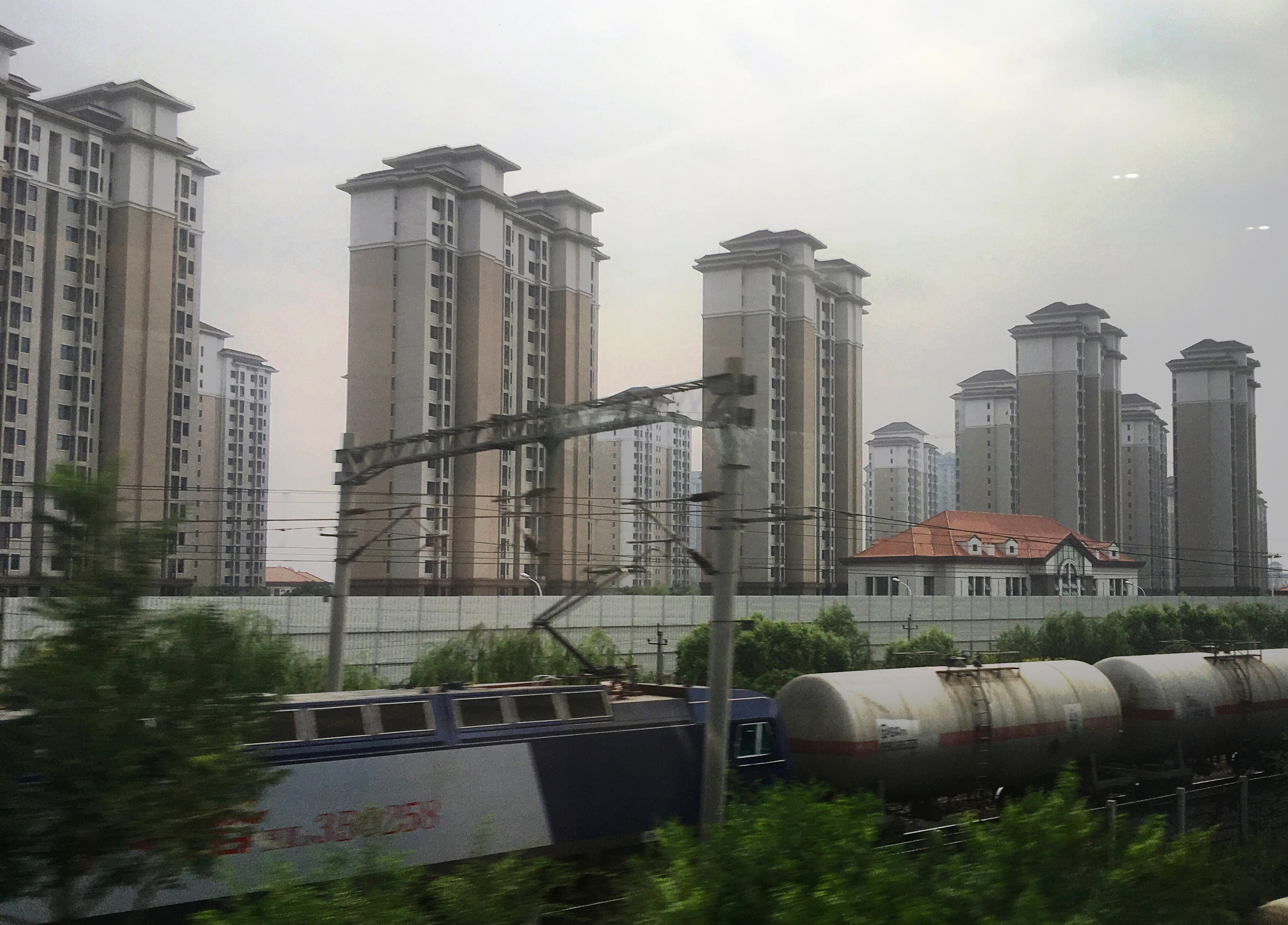
- Residential area on the northern edge of the subdistrict

- Location within Tianjin Location within China
- Coordinates: 39°20′43″N 117°03′18″E
- Country: China
- Municipality: Tianjin
- District: Wuqing
- Village-level Divisions: 5 communities 4 villages

Area
  - Total: 38.82 km^{2} (14.99 sq mi)
- Elevation: 7 m (23 ft)

Population (2010)
  - Total: 16,881
  - Density: 434.9/km^{2} (1,126/sq mi)
- Time zone: UTC+8 (CST)
- Postal code: 301725
- Area code: 022

Huangzhuang Subdistrict (simplified Chinese: 黄庄街道; traditional Chinese: 黃莊街道; pinyin: Huángzhuāng Jiēdào) is a subdistrict on the south edge of Wuqing District, Tianjin, China. It borders Yunhexi and Dongpuwa Subdistricts to its north, Xiazhuzhuang and Yangcun Subdistricts to its east, Shuangjie and Shuangkou Towns to its south, as well as Zhangzhuang and Chenzui Towns to its west. In the year 2010, the subdistrict is home to 16,881 people.

The name Huangzhuang (Chinese: 黄庄; lit. 'Huang's Villa') originated in the founding of the locality during Ming Dynasty, when Huang family was the first settlers in the area.

== Geography ==
Huangzhuang Subdistrict is bounded by Qianjin Avenue to the north, and the Grand Canal to the east. Both Longfeng and Yongding Rivers flow through its north. The subdistrict is connected to the Binbao Expressway in the south. Its average elevation is 7 meters above the sea level.

== History ==
History of Yangcun Subdistrict
Years	Status	Belong to
1957 - 1958	Huangzhuang Township	Wuqing County, Hebei
1958 - 1961	Huangzhuang Weixing People's Commune	Wuqing County, Hebei
1961 - 1973	Huangzhuang People's Commune	Wuqing County, Hebei
1973 - 1983	Huangzhuang People's Commune	Wuqing County, Tianjin
1983 - 2000	Huangzhuang Township	Wuqing District, Tianjin
2000 - present	Huangzhuang Subdistrict	Wuqing District, Tianjin

== Administrative divisions ==
As of the year 2022, there are 9 subdivisions under Huangzhuang Subdistrict, of those 5 are residential communities and 4 are villages. They are:

=== Residential community ===
- Quansheng Jiayuan (泉昇佳苑)
- Shuangsi Ying (双寺营)
- Binhe (滨河)
- Bintai (缤泰)
- Binyue (滨悦)

=== Villages ===
- Laomidian (老米店)
- Majiakou (马家口)
- Liuhezhuang (六合庄)
- Chengshang (城上)

== See also ==
- List of township-level divisions of Tianjin
