= Dasi, Tianjin =

Town of Tianjin, China

Dasi Town 大寺镇
- Town
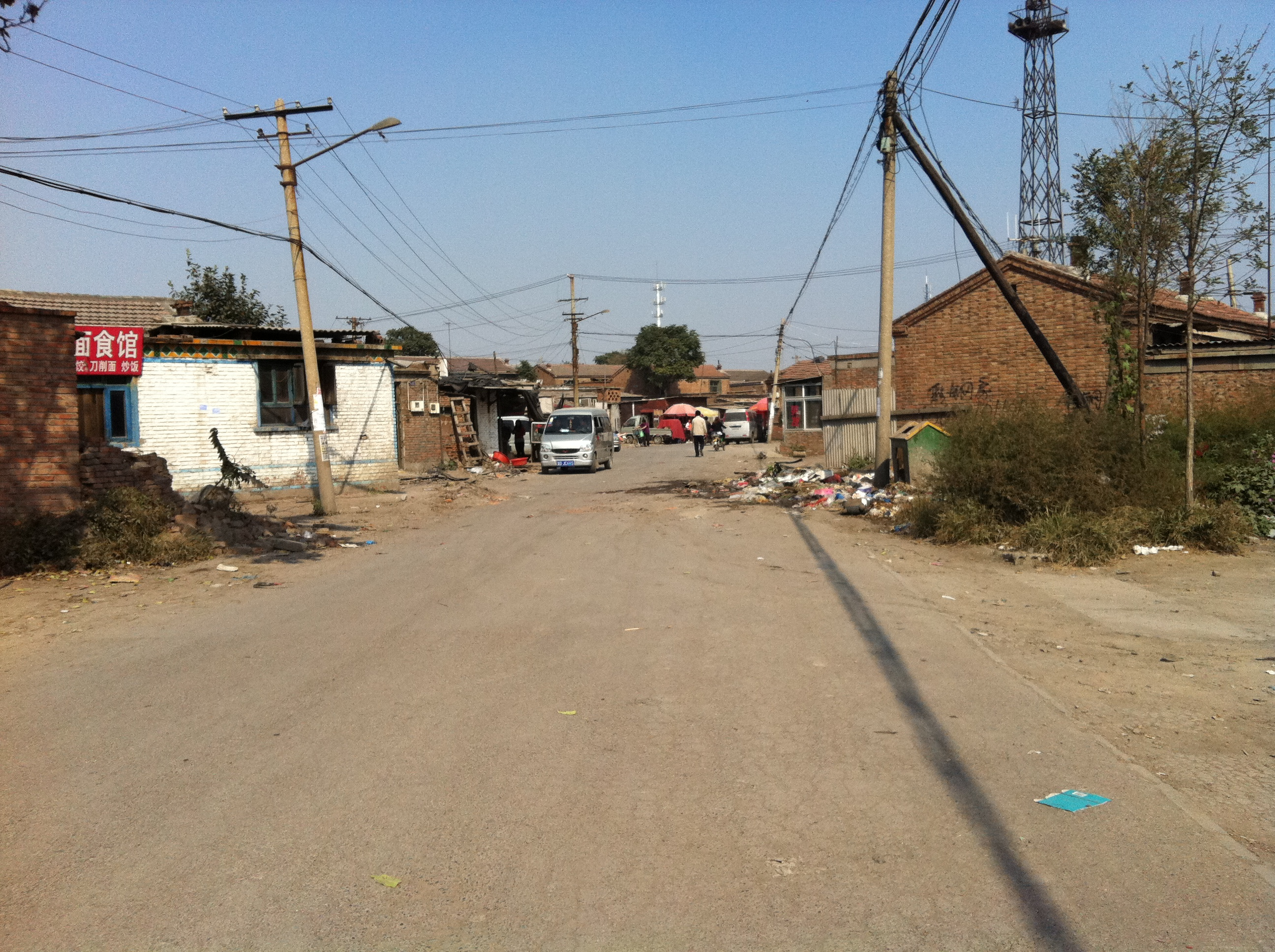
- Beikou Village on the northeast of the town, 2011

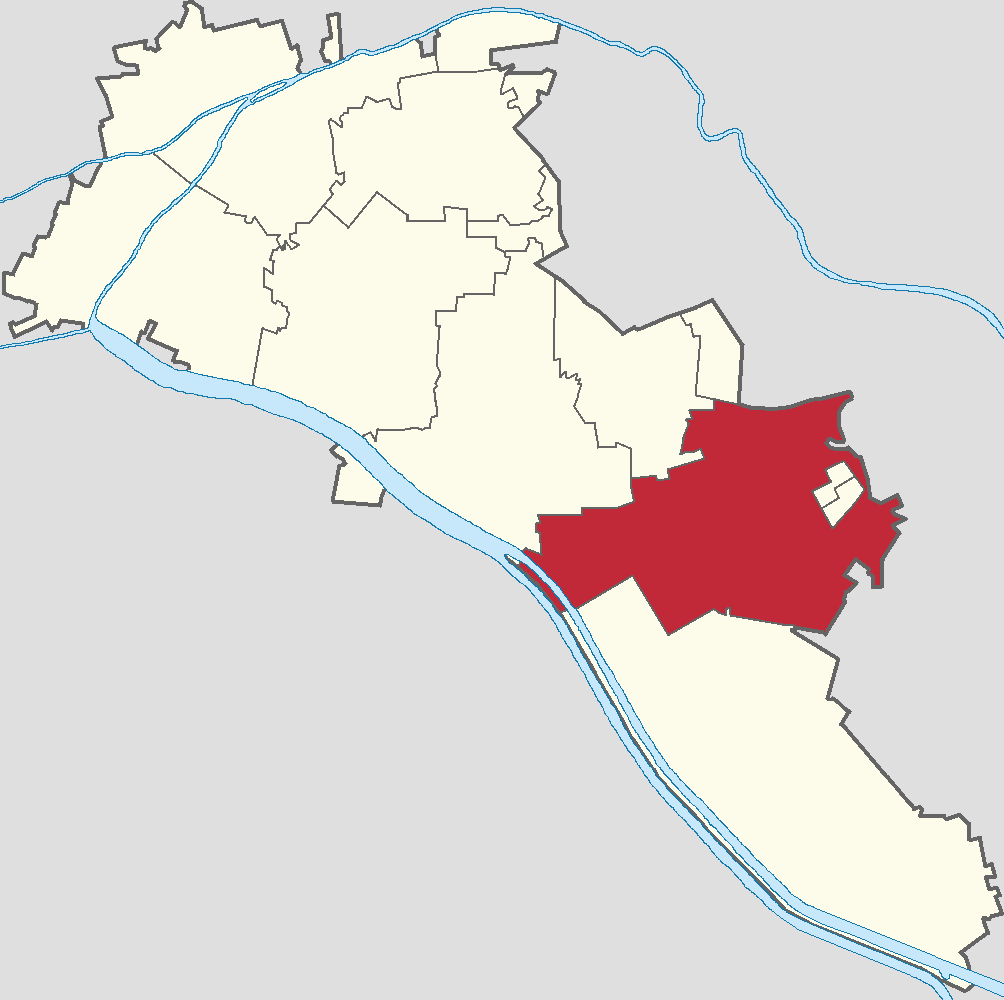
- Location of Dasi Town within Xiqing District

- Location within Tianjin Location within China
- Coordinates: 39°01′07″N 117°14′03″E
- Country: China
- Municipality: Tianjin
- District: Xiqing
- Village-level Divisions: 10 communities 15 villages

Area
  - Total: 69.73 km^{2} (26.92 sq mi)
- Elevation: 4 m (13 ft)

Population (2010)
  - Total: 113,290
  - Density: 1,625/km^{2} (4,208/sq mi)
- Time zone: UTC+8 (CST)
- Postal code: 300385
- Area code: 022

Dasi Town (simplified Chinese: 大寺镇; traditional Chinese: 大寺鎮; pinyin: Dàsì Zhèn) a town situated in the eastern part of Xiqing District, Tianjin, China. It shares a border with Meijiang and Taihulu Subdistricts to its north, Shuanggang Town and Haitang Subdistrict to its east, Xinzhuang and Balitai Towns to its southeast, Wangwengzhuang Town to its south, Jingwu Town and Liqizhuang Subdistrict to its west, and Jinmenhu Subdistrict to its northwest. The town also contains two subdistricts within: Chilongnan and Chilongbei Subdistricts. The population of this town is 113,290 as of 2010.

The town's name "Dasi" (Chinese: 大寺; lit. 'Great Temple') is referring to Yongxi Temple that was constructed here during the Song dynasty.

== Geography ==
Dasi Town is situated on the northern bank of Duliujian River. Tianjin-Hebei Expressway passes through the town.

== History ==
History of Dasi Town
Time	Status	Belong to
Song and Jin dynasties		Qianning County
Yuan dynasty		Jinghai County
Ming and Qing dynasties		Jinghai County, Hejian Prefecture
1923–1950		1st District, Jinghai County
1950–1953		1st District, Tianjin County
1953–1957	Dasi Township Da Lubeikou Township	Jinxijiao District, Tianjin
1957–1958	Da Nanhe Township	Jinghai County
1958–1959	Da Lubeikou Township	Xijiao District, Tianjin
1959–1963	Da Lubeikou Management Area Dasi Management Area	Xijiao District, Tianjin
1963–1964	Da Lubeikou People's Commune	Xijiao District, Tianjin
1964–1968	Dasi People's Commune	Xijiao District, Tianjin
1968–1980	Dasi Revolutionary Committee	Xijiao District, Tianjin
1980–1983	Dasi People's Commune	Xijiao District, Tianjin
1983–1992	Dasi Township	Xijiao District, Tianjin
1992–1995	Dasi Township	Xiqing District, Tianjin
1995–present	Dasi Town	Xiqing District, Tianjin

== Administrative divisions ==
As of the year 2022, Dasi Town is divided into 25 subdivisions, more specifically 10 residential communities and 15 villages. They are listed as follows:

Subdivision names	Name transliterations	Type
泉集里	Quanji Li	Community
龙居花园	Longju Huayuan	Community
福特纳湾	Futena Wan	Community
博文苑	Bowen Yuan	Community
远洋万和城	Yuanyang Wanhe Cheng	Community
洛卡小镇	Luoka Xiaozhen	Community
金谊花园	Jinyi Huayuan	Community
龙顺园	Longshun Yuan	Community
金友花园	Jinyou Huayuan	Community
金瀚园	Jinhan Yuan	Community
梅江康城	Meijiang Kangcheng	Community
大寺	Dasi	Village
王村	Wang Cun	Village
芦北口	Lubeikou	Village
青凝候	Qingninghou	Village
王庄子村	Wang Zhuangzi Cun	Village
石庄子村	Shi Zhuangzi Cun	Village
李庄子村	Li Zhuangzi Cun	Village
南口	Nankou	Village
北口	Beikou	Village
贾庄子	Jia Zhuangzi	Village
大任庄	Da Renzhuang	Village
周庄子	Zhou Zhuangzi	Village
倪黄庄	Niehuang Zhuang	Village
张道口	Zhang Daokou	Village
门道口	Men Daokou	Village

== See also ==
- List of township-level divisions of Tianjin
