= Jingwu =

Town of Tianjin, China

Jingwu Town 精武镇
- Town
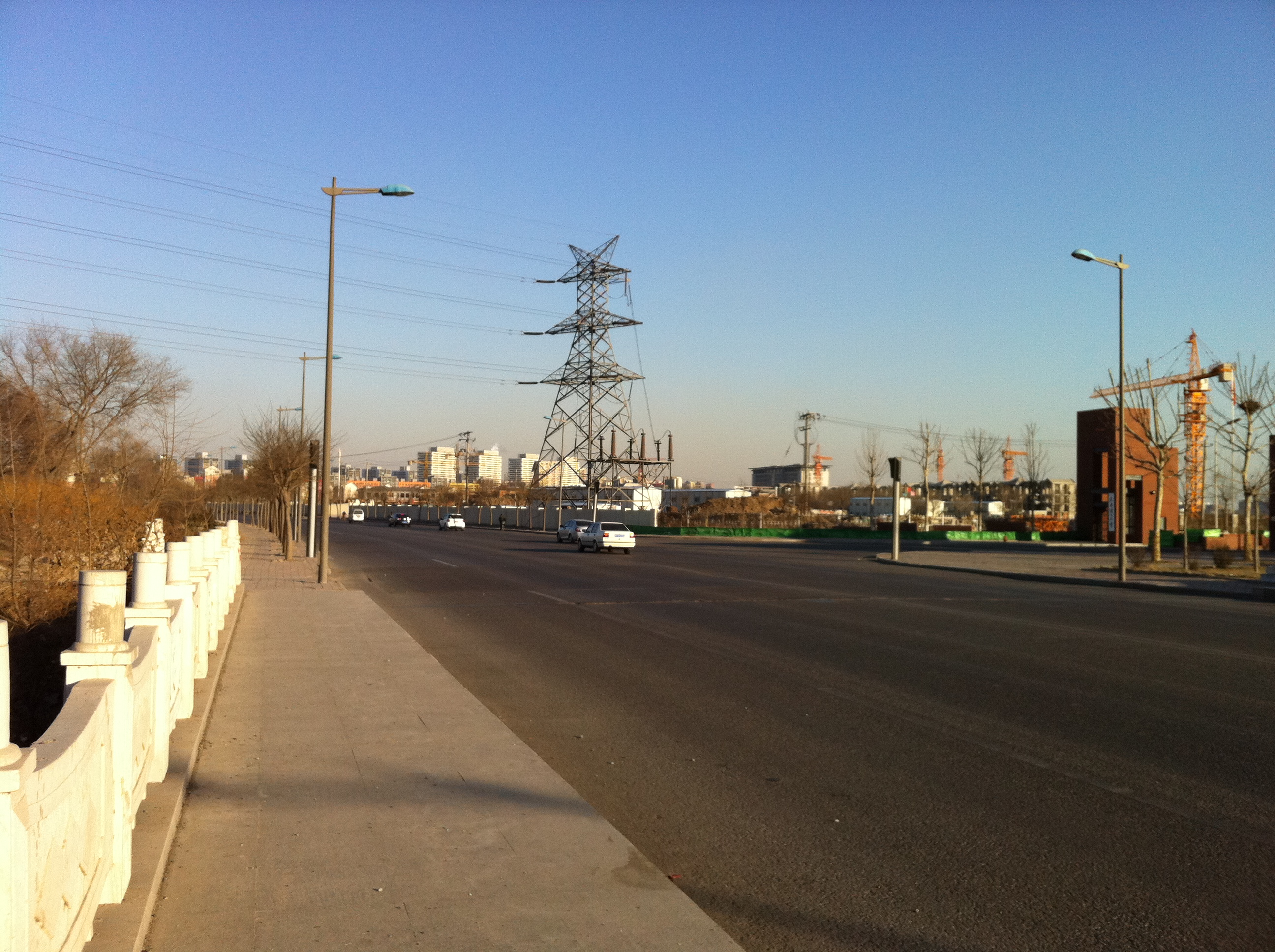
- Binshui West Road, on the northeastern part of the town, 2011

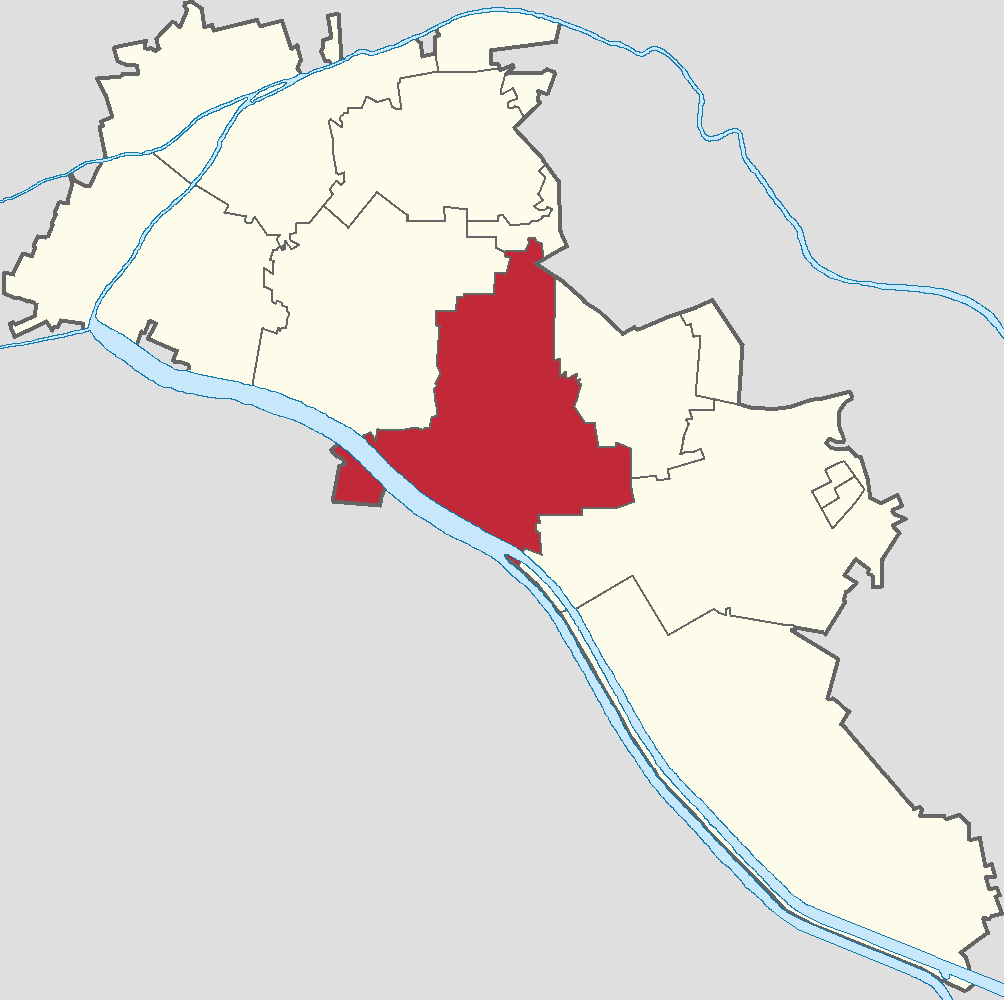
- Location in Xiqing District

- Location within Tianjin Location within China
- Coordinates: 39°02′38″N 117°06′38″E
- Country: China
- Municipality: Tianjin
- District: Xiqing
- Village-level Divisions: 13 communities 18 villages

Area
  - Total: 67.51 km^{2} (26.07 sq mi)
- Elevation: 4 m (13 ft)

Population (2010)
  - Total: 49,176
  - Density: 728.4/km^{2} (1,887/sq mi)
- Time zone: UTC+8 (CST)
- Postal code: 300382
- Area code: 022

Jingwu Town (simplified Chinese: 精武镇; traditional Chinese: 精武鎮; pinyin: Jīngwǔ Zhèn) is one of the seven towns in Xiqing District, Tianjin, China. It borders Xiyingmen and Huayuan Subdistricts to the north, Liqizhuang Subdistrict and Dasi Town to the east, Tuanbo Town and Yangchengzhuang Township to the south, and Zhangjiawo Town to the west. As of 2010, it has a population of 49,176.

The town was named "Jingwu" (Chinese: 精武; lit. 'Mastering Martial Art') in honor of Huo Yuanjia, a martial artist and folk hero during the late Qing Dynasty credited as the founder of the Jingwu Athletic Association.

== Geography ==
Jingwu Town is situated on the northern bank of Duliujian River. Tianjin-Hebei Expressway passes through the town.

== History ==
History of Jingwu Town
Time	Status	Under
Song and Jin Dynasties	Nanhe Stockade Village	Jinghai County
Ming Dynasty	Dong Township	Jinghai County
Qing dynasty	Part of North Circuit and East Circuit	Jinghai County
1923 - 1929	Part of 5th and 6th Districts	Jinghai County
1929 - 1945	Part of 1st and 6th Districts	Jinghai County
1945 - 1953	Part of 6th District	Jinghai County
1953 - 1956	Yanzhuangzi Township; Qingninghou Township; Da Nanhe Township; Niutuozi Township	Jinxijiao District, Tianjin
1956 - 1957	Yanzhuangzi Township; Da Nanhe Township	Jinxijiao District, Tianjin
1957 - 1958	Da Nanhe Township	Jinxijiao District, Tianjin
1958 - 1960	Yanzhuangzi Management Area, part of Tuanbowa People's Commune	Jinxijiao District, Tianjin
1960 - 1961	Yanzhuangzi Management Area, part of Tuanbowa People's Commune	Heping District, Tianjin
1961 - 1962	Part of Tuanbowa People's Commune; Part of Guocun People's Commune	Heping District, Tianjin
1962 - 1963	Part of Tuanbowa People's Commune; Part of Guocun People's Commune	Xijiao District, Tianjin
1963 - 1964	Qingninghou People's Commune; Yanzhuangzi People's Commune; Xiao Nanhe People's Commune; Guocun People's Commune	Xijiao District, Tianjin
1964 - 1969	Fucun People's Commune; Xiao Bianzhuang People's Commune	Xijiao District, Tianjin
1969 - 1983	Fucun People's Commune	Xijiao District, Tianjin
1983 - 1984	Fucun Township	Xijiao District, Tianjin
1984 - 1985	Yonghong Township	Xijiao District, Tianjin
1985 - 1992	Nanhe Town	Xijiao District, Tianjin
1992 - 2009	Nanhe Town	Xiqing District, Tianjin
2009–present	Jingwu Town	Xiqing District, Tianjin

== Administrative divisions ==
By the end of 2022, Jingwu Town is divided into 31 subdivisions, of which 13 are residential communities and 18 are villages. They are listed below:

Subdivision names	Name transliterations	Type
兴旺里	Xingwang Li	Community
汇英苑	Huiying Yuan	Community
恒益隆庭	Hengyi Longting	Community
智达里	Zhida Li	Community
盛兴佳园	Shengying Jiayuan	Community
国兴佳园	Guoxing Jiayuan	Community
燕南园	Yannan Yuan	Community
格调松间	Gediao Songjian	Community
锦泽苑	Jinze Yuan	Community
沁雅苑	Qinya Yuan	Community
天津师范大学	Tianjin Shifan Daxue	Community
天津工业大学	Tianjin Gongye Daxue	Community
天津警官职业学校	Tianjin Jingguan Zhiye Xueyuan	Community
小南河	Xiao Nanhe	Village
大南河	Da Nanhe	Village
付村	Fu Cun	Village
姚村	Yao Cun	Village
潘楼	Panlou	Village
郭村	Guo Cun	Village
刘庄	Liu Zhuang	Village
马家寺	Majia Si	Village
小卷子	Xiao Juanzi	Village
大卷子	Da Juanzi	Village
牛坨子	Niutuozi	Village
王庄子	Wang Zhuangzi	Village
孙庄子	Sun Zhuangzi	Village
吴庄子	Wu Zhuangzi	Village
阎庄子村	Yan Zhuangzi	Village
小卞庄	Xiao Bianzhuang	Village
宽河	Kuanhe	Village
陈台子	Chentaizi	Village

== Galleries ==
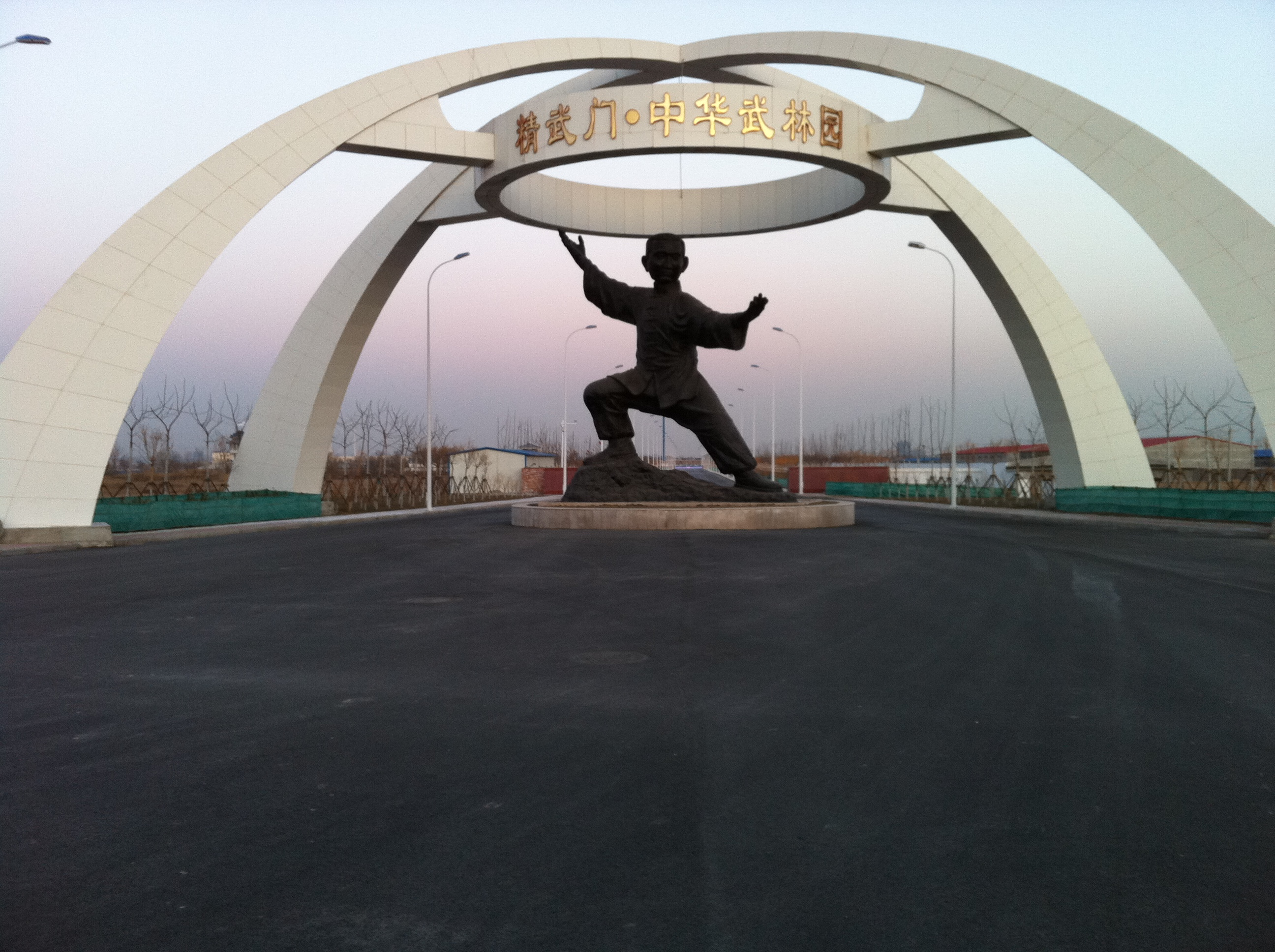
Jingwu Gate Chinese Martial Art Park within the town, 2011

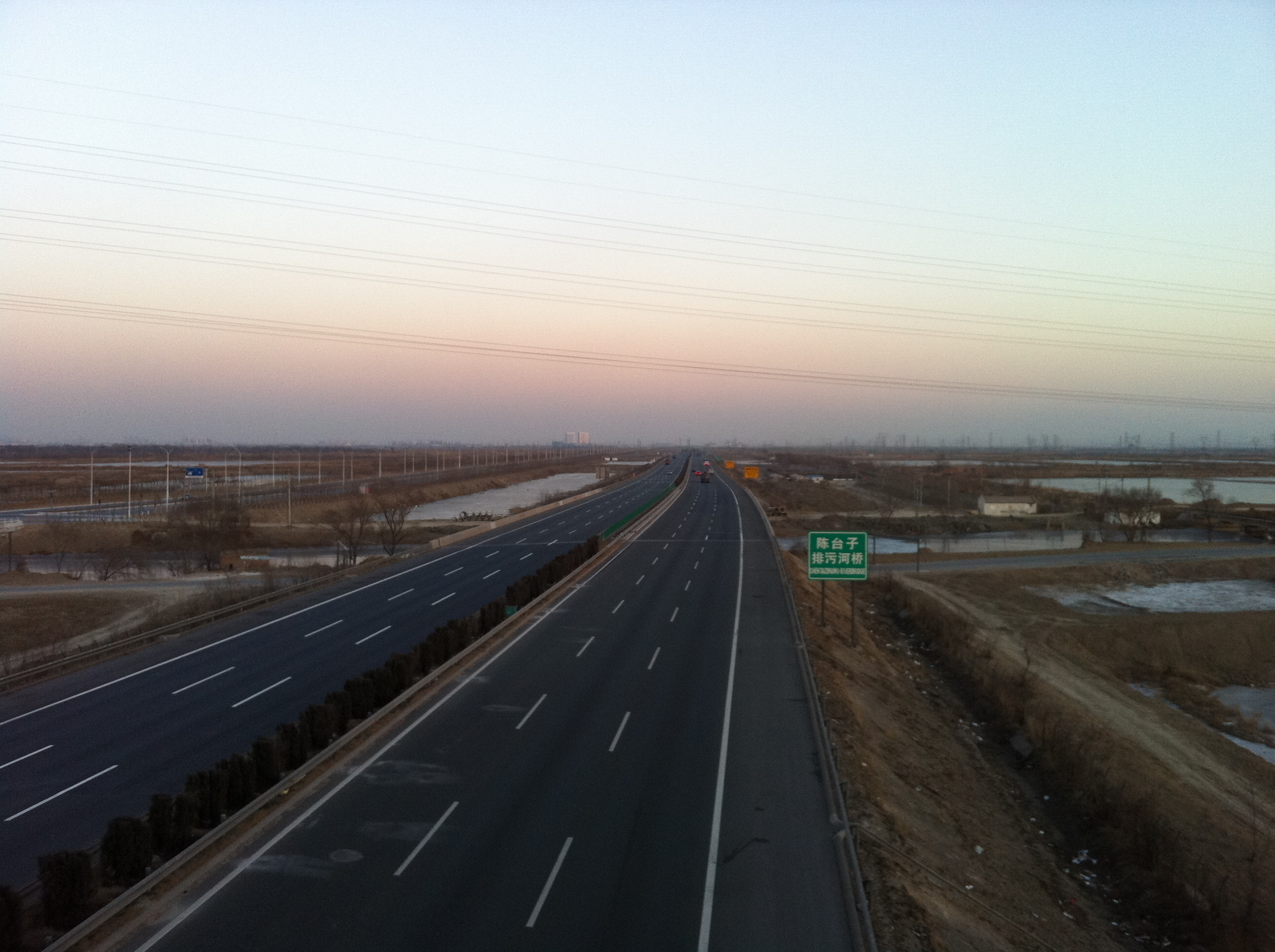
Rongwu Expressway passing through the town, 2011

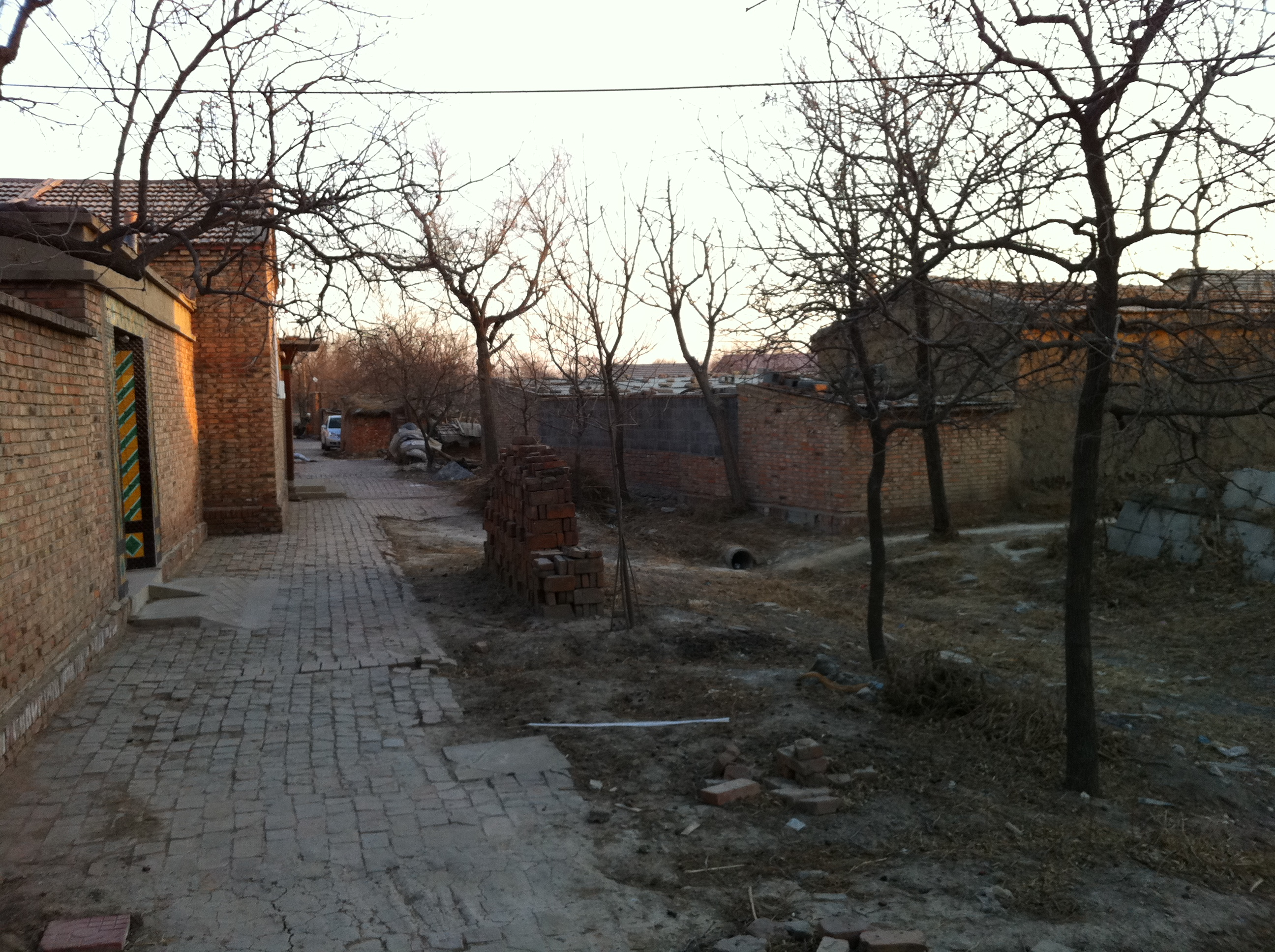
Liu Zhuang Village, 2011

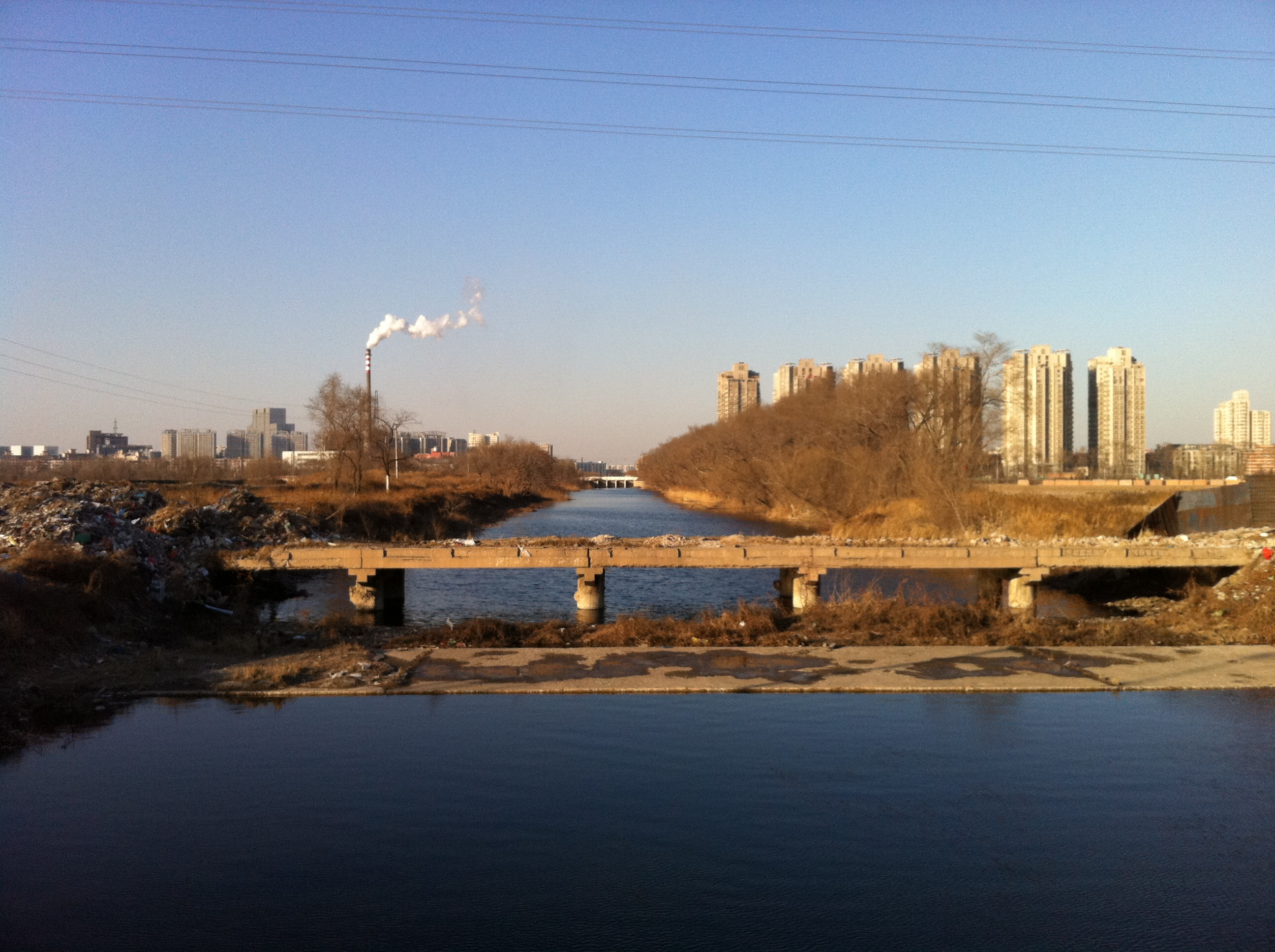
Chentaizi Paishui River, 2011

== See also ==
- List of township-level divisions of Tianjin
