= Wangwenzhuang =

Town of Tianjin, China

Wangwenzhuang Town 王稳庄镇
- Town
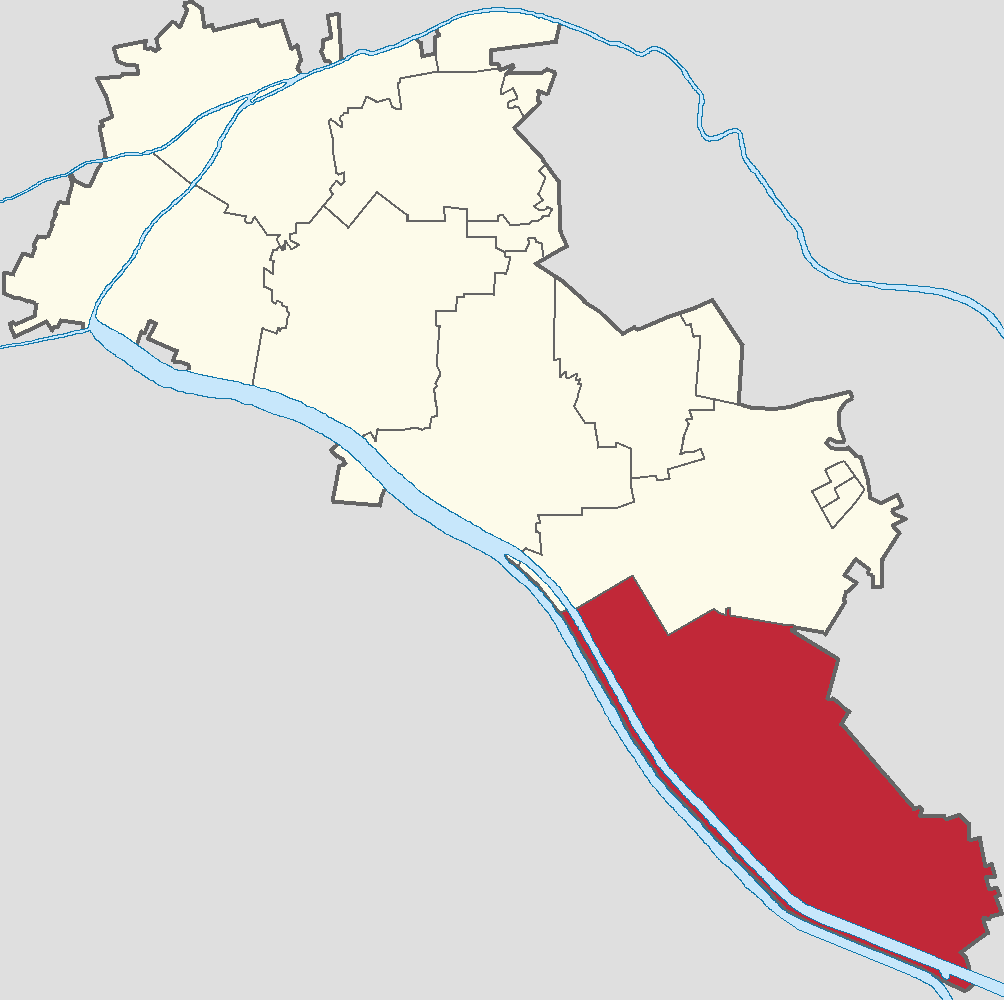
- Location within Xiqing District

- Location within Tianjin Location within China
- Coordinates: 38°53′38″N 117°15′36″E
- Country: China
- Municipality: Tianjin
- District: Xiqing
- Village-level Divisions: 4 communities 15 villages

Area
  - Total: 119 km^{2} (46 sq mi)
- Elevation: 3 m (9.8 ft)

Population (2010)
  - Total: 41,363
  - Density: 348/km^{2} (900/sq mi)
- Time zone: UTC+8 (CST)
- Postal code: 300383
- Area code: 022

Wangwenzhuang Town (simplified Chinese: 王稳庄镇; traditional Chinese: 王穩莊鎮; pinyin: Wángwěnzhuāng Zhèn) is a town situated in the eastern part of Xiqing District, Tianjin, China. It borders Dasi Town to its north, Balitai Town to its east, Haibin Subdistrict and Zhongtang Town to its south, and Tuanbo Town to its west. As of 2010, the town is home to 41,363 inhabitants.

The name "Wangwenzhuang" (Chinese: 王稳庄; lit. 'Wangwen's Villa') is said to come from Wang Wen, a locally well-known resident of this region during the late Ming dynasty.

== Geography ==
Wangwenzhuang Town is located on the northern bank of Duliujian River. There are several reservoirs and artificial lakes within the town, the largest being Yadian Reservoir. National Highway 18 and 233 both pass through the town.

== History ==
History of Wangwenzhuang Town
| Time | Status | Part of |
|---|---|---|
| Ming and Qing Dynasties | | Jinghai County, Hejian Prefecture |
| 1912 - 1949 | | 2nd District, Jinghai County, Hebei |
| 1949 - 1958 | Wangwenzhuang Township | 8th District, Jinghai County, Hebei |
| 1958 - 1962 | Within Tuanbowa People's Commune | 8th District, Jinghai County, Hebei |
| 1962 - 1983 | Wangwenzhuang People's Commune | Xijiao District, Tianjin |
| 1983 - 1992 | Wangwenzhuang Township | Xijiao District, Tianjin |
| 1992 - 1997 | Wangwenzhuang Township | Xiqing District, Tianjin |
| 1997 - present | Wangwenzhuang Town | Xiqing District, Tianjin |

== Administrative divisions ==
As of 2022, Wangwenzhuang Town consists of 19 subdivisions, including 4 residential communities and 15 villages. They are listed as follows:

| Subdivision names | Name transliterations | Type |
|---|---|---|
| 泰康园 | Taikang Yuan | Community |
| 盛祥园 | Shengxiang Yuan | Community |
| 泰祥园 | Taixiang Yuan | Community |
| 盛泰园 | Shengtai Yuan | Community |
| 王稳庄 | Wangwen Zhuang | Village |
| 东台子 | Dong Taizi | Village |
| 东兰坨 | Dong Lantuo | Village |
| 杨科庄 | Yangke Zhuang | Village |
| 小张庄 | Xiaozhang Zhuang | Village |
| 西兰坨 | Xi Lantuo | Village |
| 小韩庄 | Xiaohang Zhuang | Village |
| 二侯庄 | Erhou Zhuang | Village |
| 小年庄 | Xiaonian Zhuang | Village |
| 大侯庄 | Dahou Zhuang | Village |
| 小金庄 | Xiaojin Zhuang | Village |
| 小泊 | Xiaobo | Village |
| 大泊 | Dabo | Village |
| 小孙庄 | Xiaosun Zhuang | Village |
| 建新 | Jianxin | Village |

== See also ==
- List of township-level divisions of Tianjin
