= Zhangjiawo =

Town of Tianjin, China

Zhangjiawo Town 张家窝镇
- Town
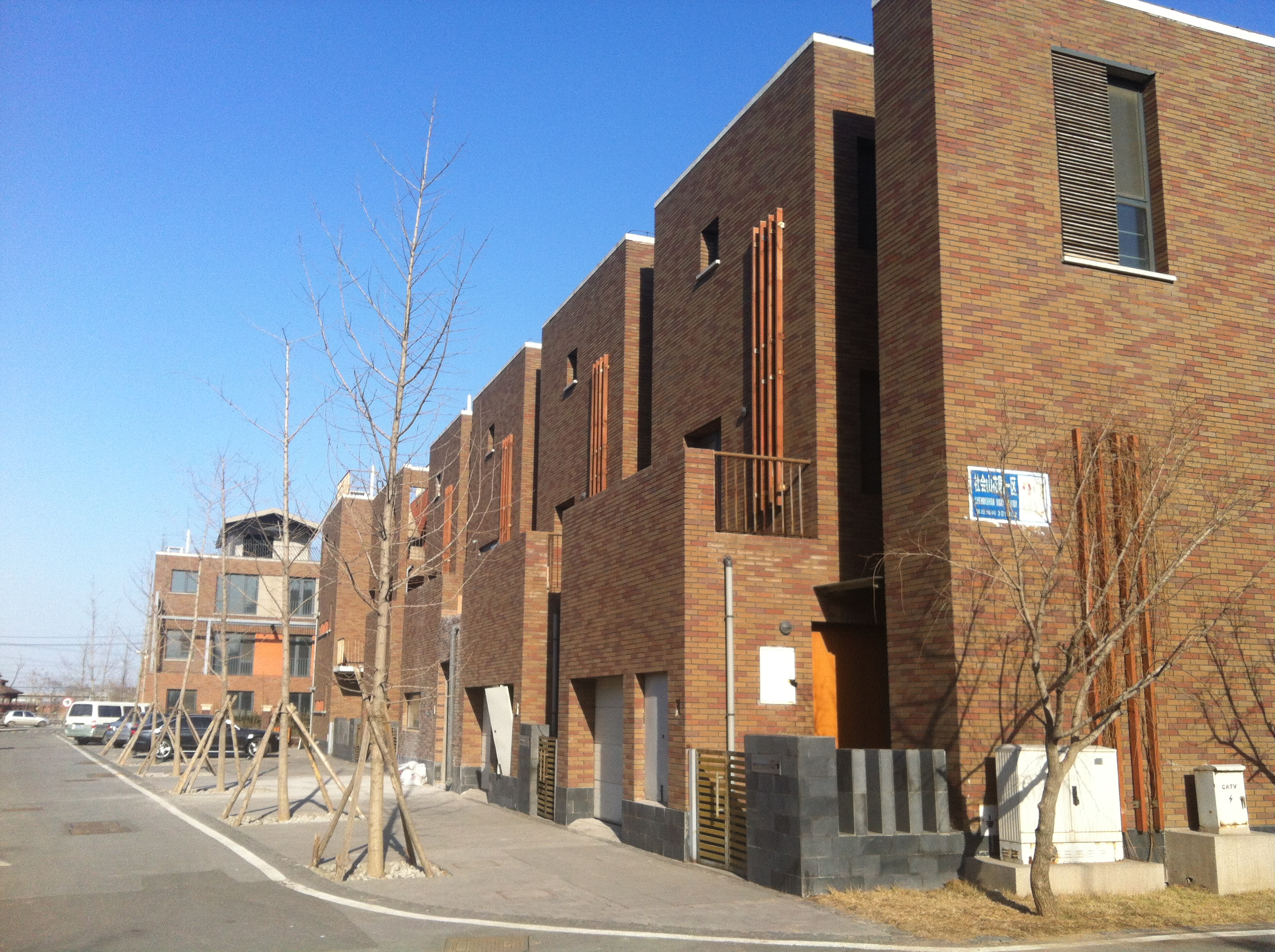
- Shehuishan Residential Community within the town, 2012

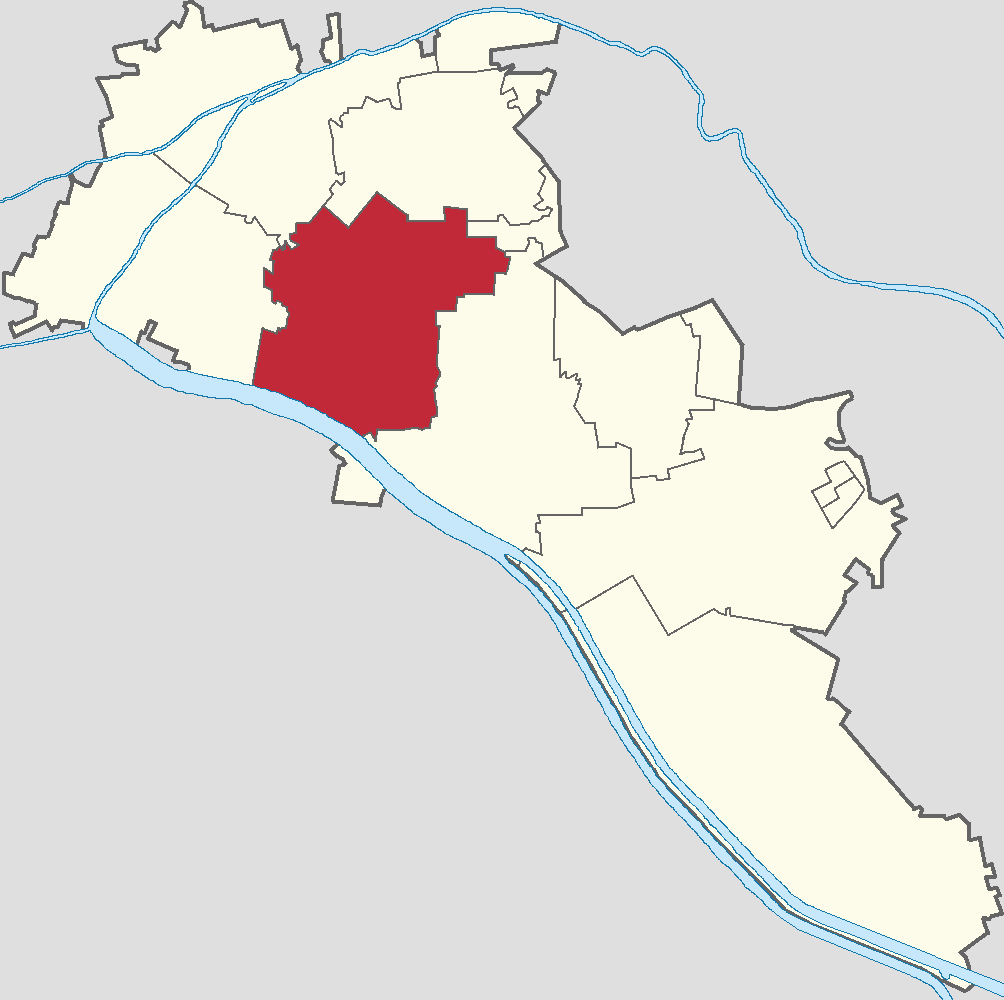
- Location in Xiqing District

- Location within Tianjin Location within China
- Coordinates: 39°03′24″N 117°02′10″E
- Country: China
- Municipality: Tianjin
- District: Xiqing
- Village-level Divisions: 22 communities 7 villages

Area
  - Total: 55.76 km^{2} (21.53 sq mi)
- Elevation: 5 m (16 ft)

Population (2010)
  - Total: 47,786
  - Density: 857.0/km^{2} (2,220/sq mi)
- Time zone: UTC+8 (CST)
- Postal code: 300387
- Area code: 022

Zhangjiawo Town (simplified Chinese: 张家窝镇; traditional Chinese: 張家窩鎮; pinyin: Zhāngjiāwō Zhèn) is one of the seven towns in Xiqing District, Tianjin, China. It borders Zhongbei Town and Xiyingmen Subdistrict in its north, Jingwu Town in its east, Yangchengzhuang and Liangwangzhuang Townships in its south, as well as Yangliuqing and Xinkou Towns in its west. Its population is 47,786 in 2010.

The name "Zhangjiawo" (Chinese: 张家窝; lit. 'Zhang Family's Shed') comes from Zhangjiawo Village, which hosts the town's government.

== Geography ==
Zhangjiawo Town is located on the northern shore of Duliujian River. Tianjin-Cangzhou Expressway passes through the town.

== History ==
Timetable of Zhangjiawo Town
| Years | Status | Within |
|---|---|---|
| 1964 - 1983 | Zhangjiawo People's Commune | Xijiao District, Tianjn |
| 1983 - 1992 | Zhangjiawo Township | Xijiao District, Tianjn |
| 1992 - 1994 | Zhangjiawo Township | Xiqing District, Tianjin |
| 1994 - present | Zhangjiawo Town | Xiqing District, Tianjin |

== Administrative divisions ==
By the end of 2022, Zhangjiawo Town consists of 29 subdivisions, with 22 residential communities and 7 villages. They are listed as follows:

| Subdivision names | Name transliterations | Type |
|---|---|---|
| 京福里 | Jingfuli | Community |
| 工农联盟 | Gongnong Lianmeng | Community |
| 田丽 | Tianli | Community |
| 杰盛里 | Jieshengli | Community |
| 翠景园 | Cuijing Yuan | Community |
| 瑞欣家园 | Ruixin Jiayuan | Community |
| 四季花城 | Siji Huacheng | Community |
| 社会山南苑 | Shehuishan Nanyuan | Community |
| 社会山东苑 | Shehuishan Dongyuan | Community |
| 翡翠大道 | Feicui Dadao | Community |
| 香邑花苑 | Xiangyi Huayuan | Community |
| 家贤里 | Jiaxian Li | Community |
| 民盛里 | Minsheng Li | Community |
| 家兴里 | Jiaxing Li | Community |
| 锦盛里 | Jinsheng Li | Community |
| 珑园 | Long Yuan | Community |
| 知景澜园 | Zhijing Lanyuan | Community |
| 文致苑 | Wenzhi Yuan | Community |
| 天津商业大学宝德学院 | Tianjin Shangye Daxue Baode Xueyuan | Community |
| 天津城建学院 | Tianjin Chengjian Xueyuan | Community |
| 天津农学院 | Tianjin Nongxueyuan | Community |
| 天津经济管理干部学院 | Tianjin Jingji Guanli Ganbu Xueyuan | Community |
| 张家窝 | Zhangjiawo | Village |
| 康庄子 | Kang Zhuangzi | Village |
| 房庄子 | Fang Zhuangzi | Village |
| 东琉城 | Dong Liucheng | Village |
| 宫庄子 | Gong Zhuangzi | Village |
| 华庄子 | Hua Zhuangzi | Village |
| 杨武庄 | Yang Wuzhuang | Village |

== Galleries ==
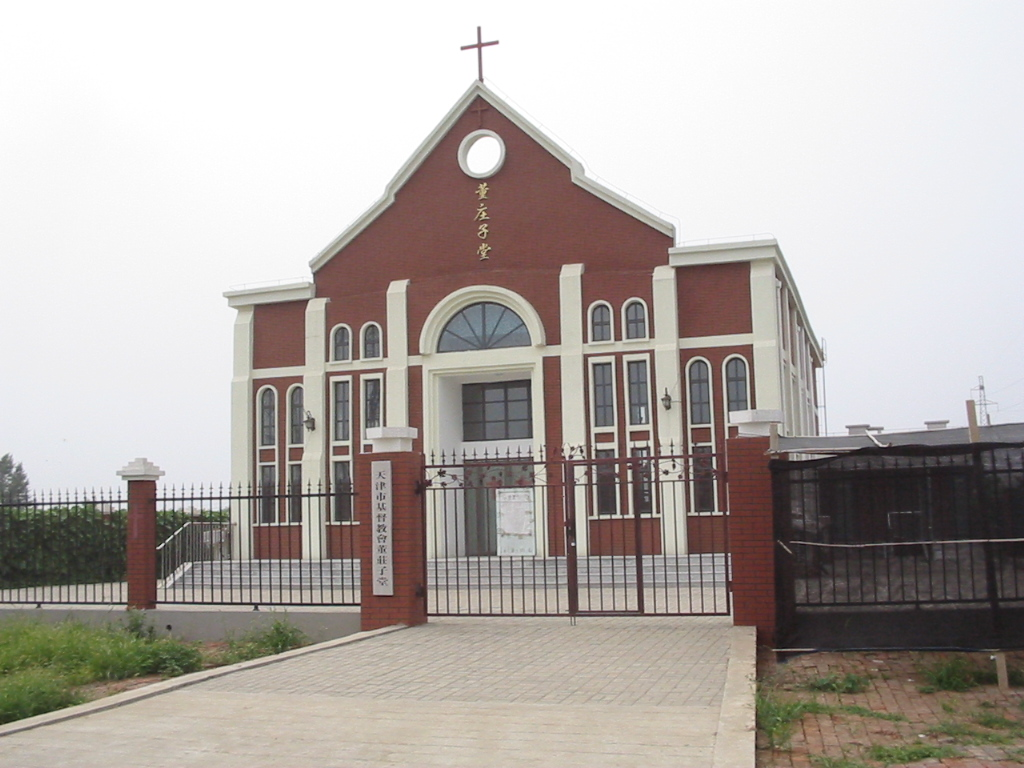
Chapel of Dongzhuangzi Christian Church, 2011

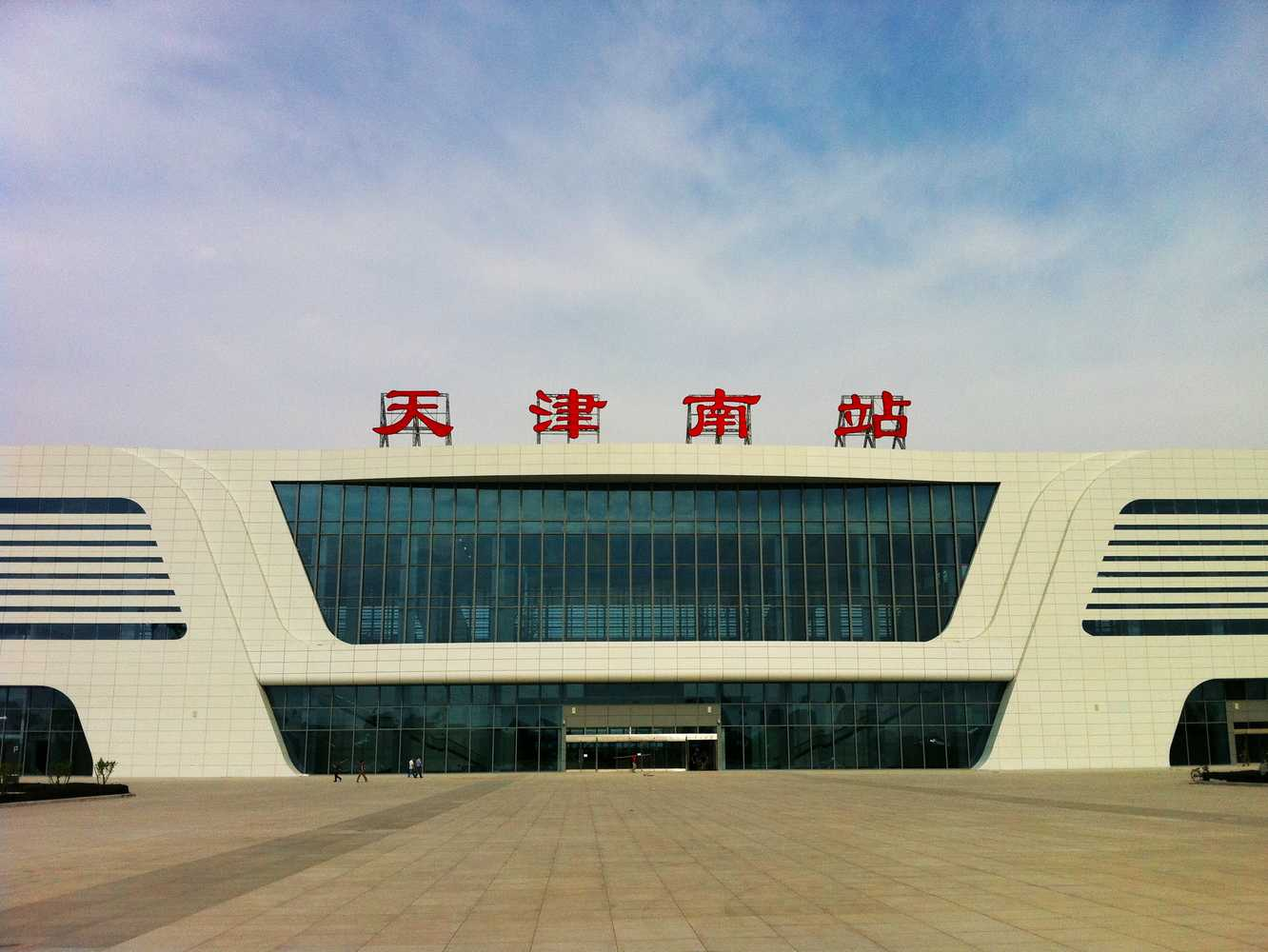
Tianjin South Station, 2011

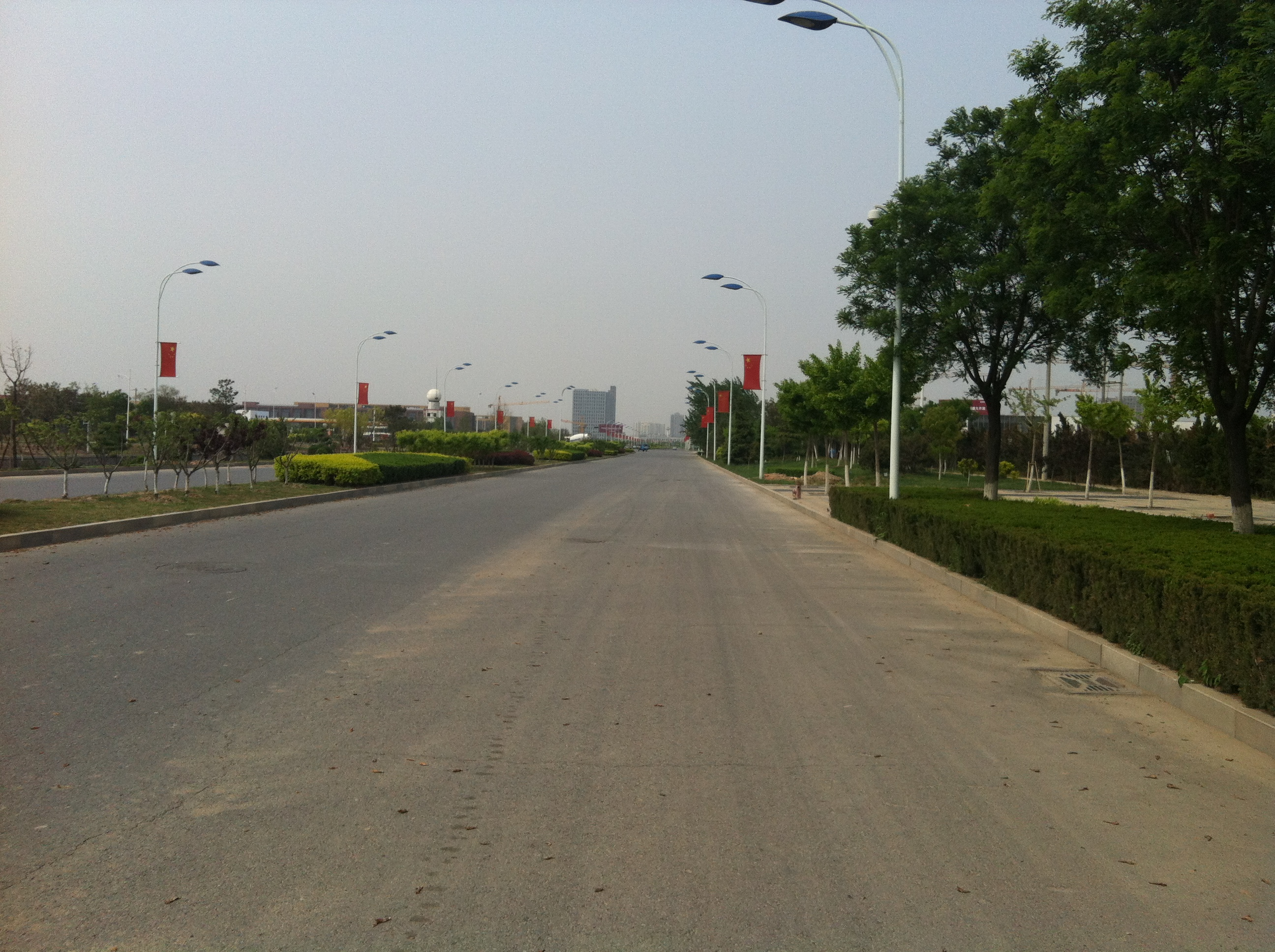
Haitai Avenue on the north of the town, 2012

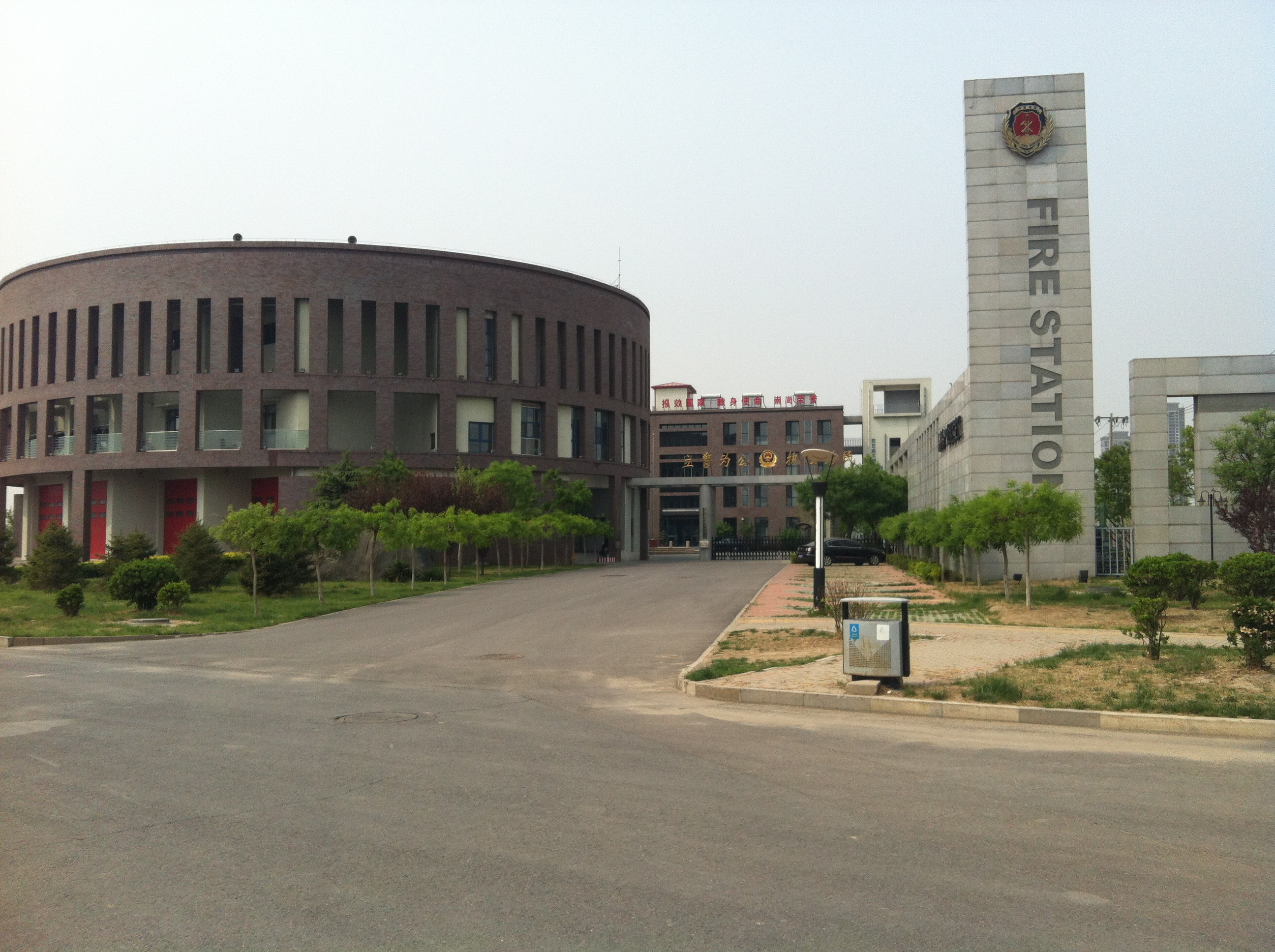
Gaoxin Fire Station, which hosts Tianjin Gaoxin Fire-fighting Culture Theme Park, 2012

== See also ==
- List of township-level divisions of Tianjin
