= Jinmenhu Subdistrict =

Subdistrict of Tianjin, China

Jinmenhu Subdistrict 津门湖街道
- Subdistrict
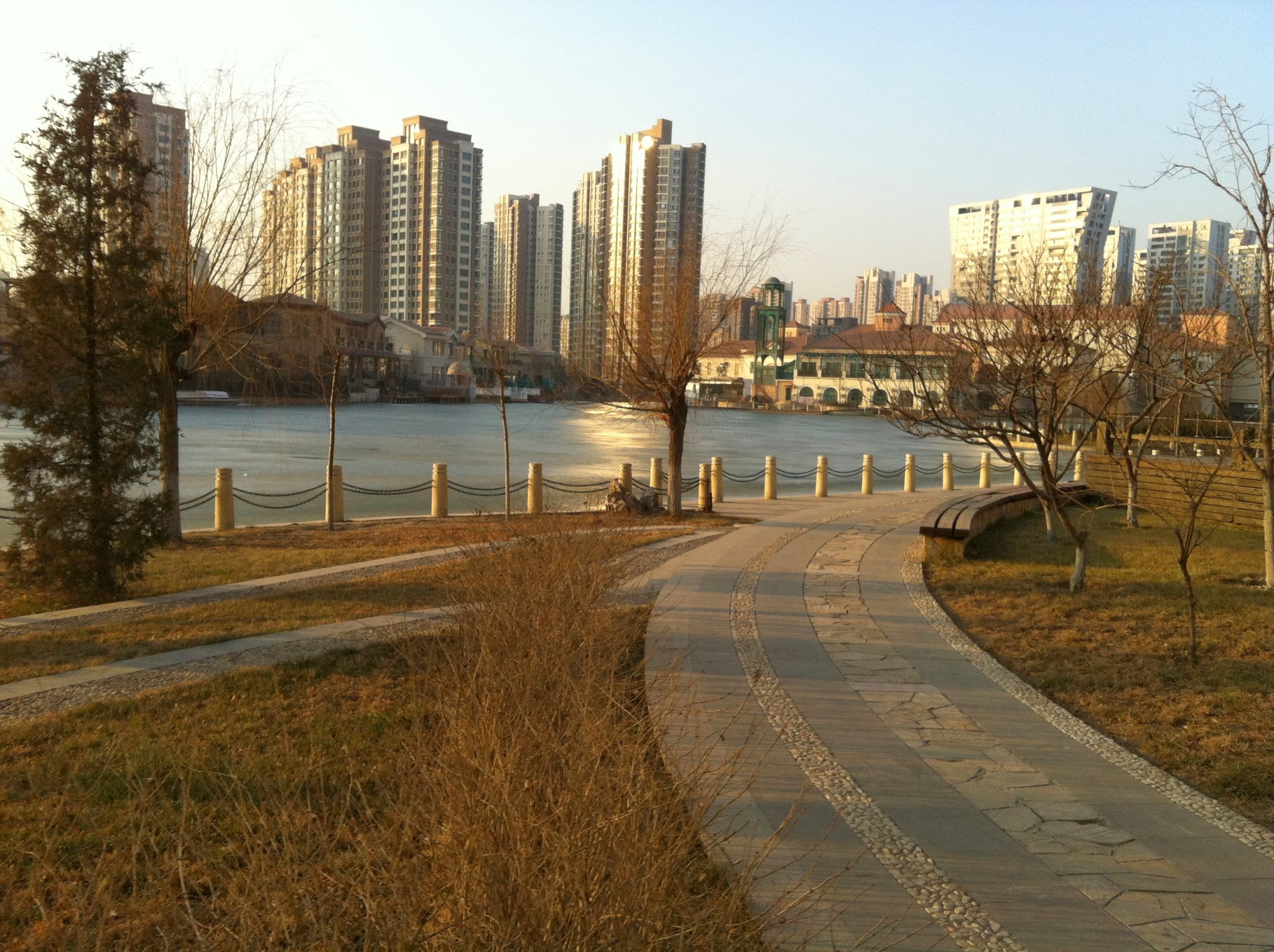
- Haiyi Changzhou Residential Community on the eastern side of the subdistrict, 2014

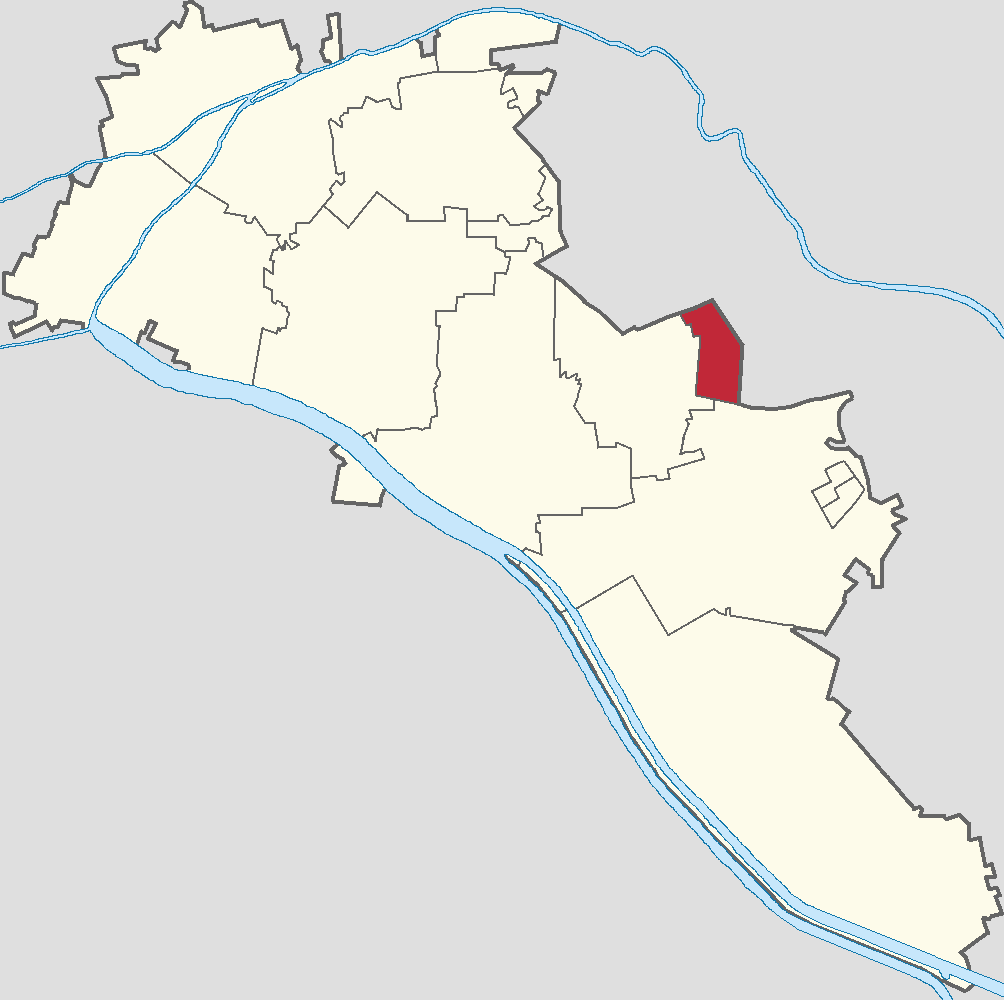
- Location of Jinmenhu Subdistrict within Xiqing District

- Location within Tianjin Location within China
- Coordinates: 39°03′12″N 117°12′27″E
- Country: China
- Municipality: Tianjin
- District: Xiqing
- Village-level Divisions: 7 communities
- Elevation: 3 m (9.8 ft)
- Time zone: UTC+8 (CST)
- Postal code: 300221
- Area code: 022

Jinmenhu Subdistrict (simplified Chinese: 津门湖街道; traditional Chinese: 津門湖街道; pinyin: Jīnménhú Jiēdào) is a subdistrict situated in Northern Xiqing District, Tianjin, China. It borders Tianta and Youyi Road Subdistricts in the north, Meijiang Subdistrict in the east, Dasi Town in the south, and Liqizhuang Subdistrict in the west.

The subdistrict was established in 2020. Its name literally means "Ford Gate Lake".

== Administrative divisions ==
In the year 2022, Jinmenhu Subdistrict administers 7 residential communities. They are listed as follows:

Subdivision names	Name transliterations
金奥国际	Jin'ao Guoji
津滨时代	Jinbin Shidai
海逸长洲	Haiyi Changzhou
富力津门湖第一	Fuli Jinmenhu Diyi
富力津门湖第二	Fuli Jinmenhu Di'er
富力津门湖第三	Fuli Jinmenhu Disan
纪庄子	Jizhuangzi

== Galleries ==
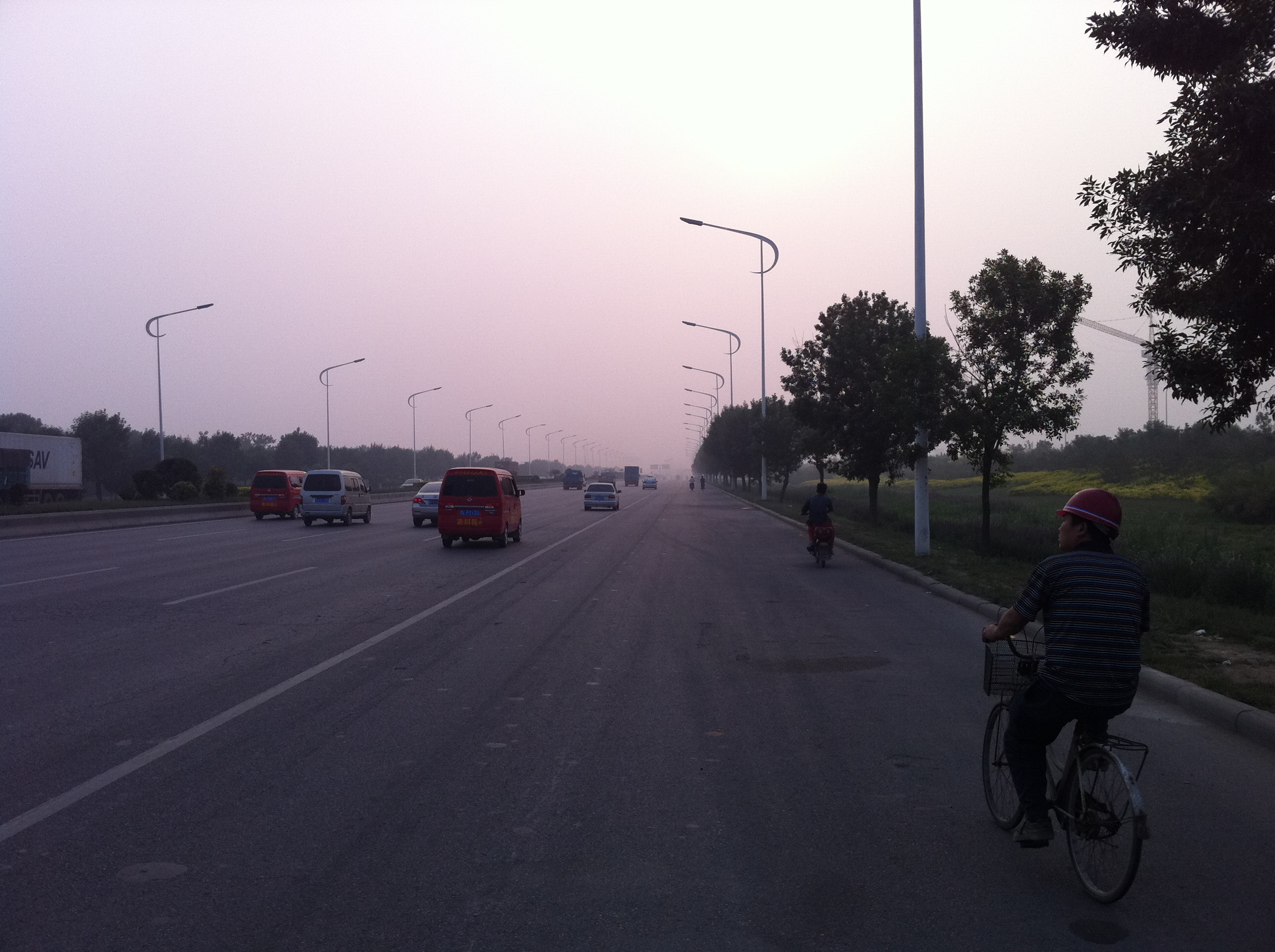
Outer Ring Road on the southern edge of the subdistrict, 2011

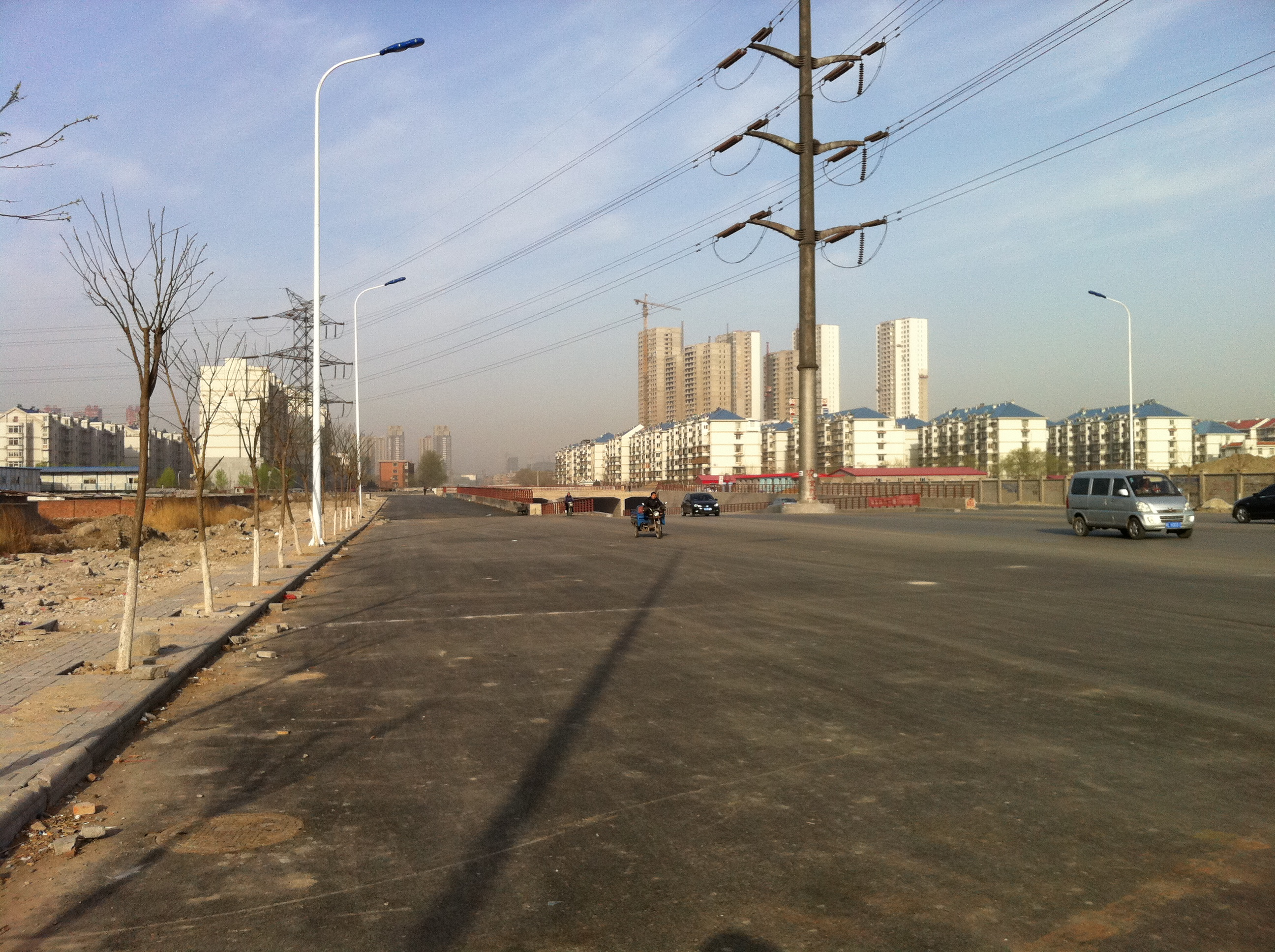
Lijiang Avenue on the north of the subdistrict, 2011

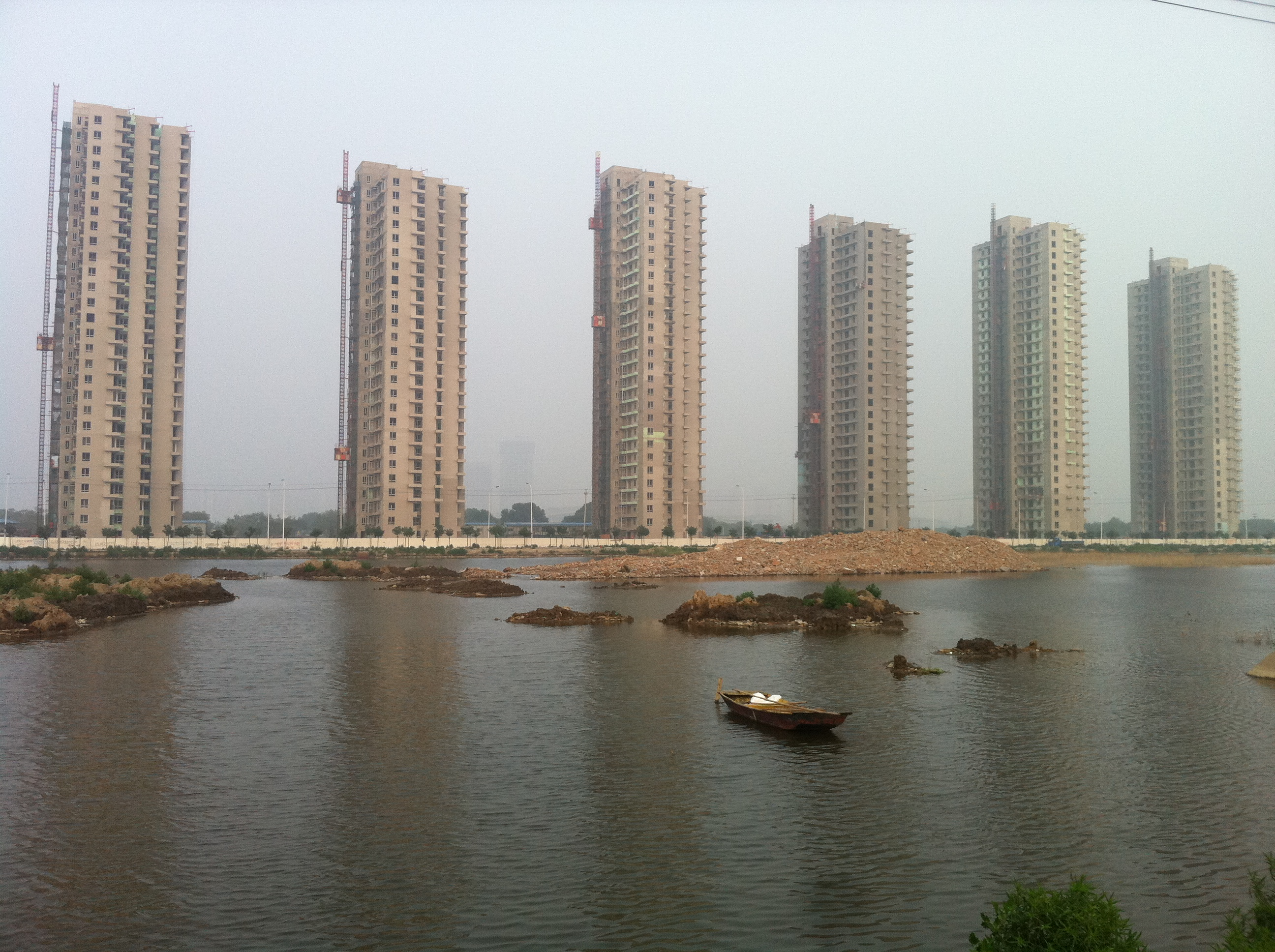
Residential buildings across the Meijiang West Road, view from a lake in Meijiang Park, 2011

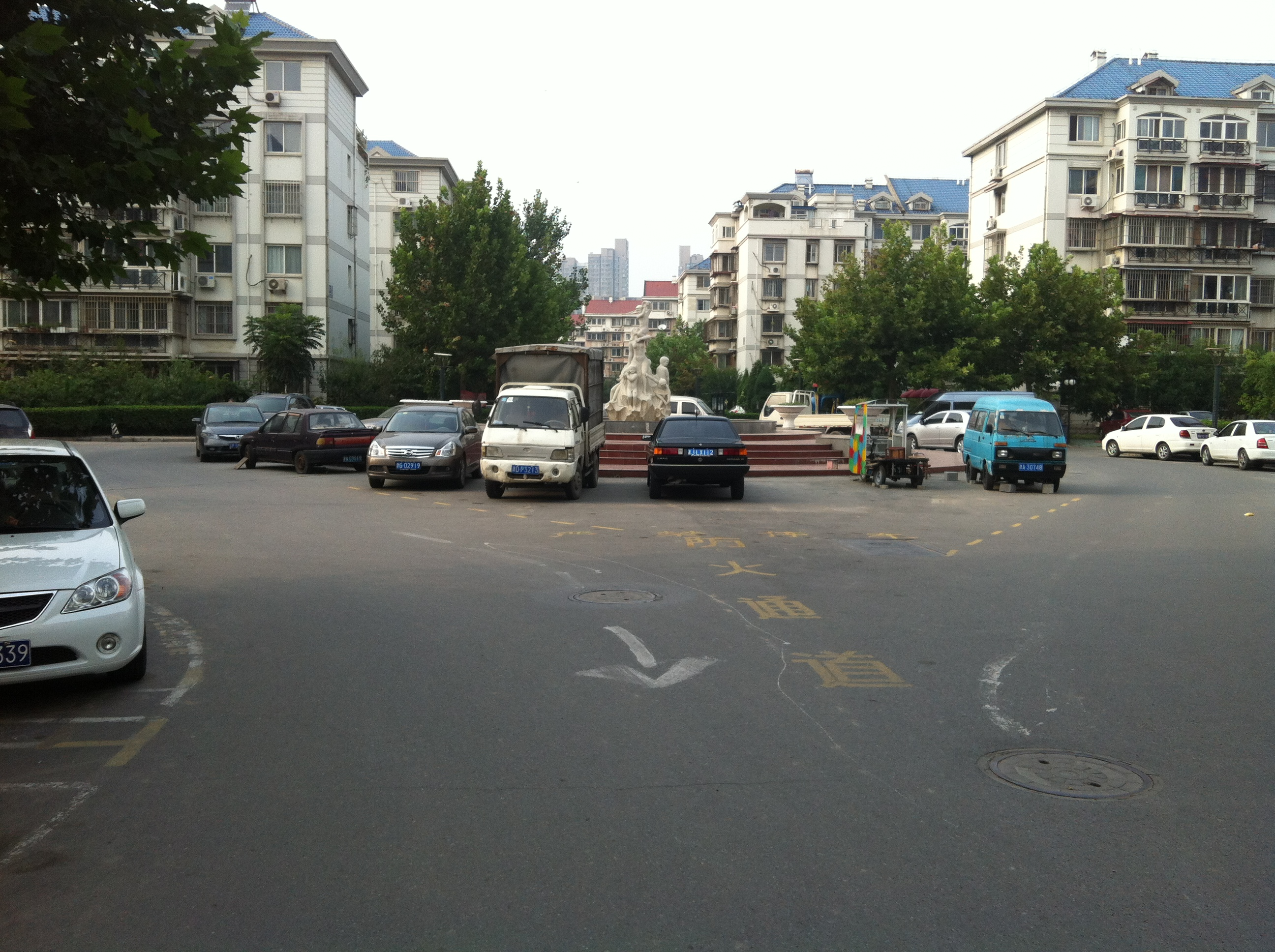
Residential community on the northwest of the subdistrict, 2012

== See also ==
- List of township-level divisions of Tianjin
