= Xiqing, Tianjin =

Xiqing 西青区
- District
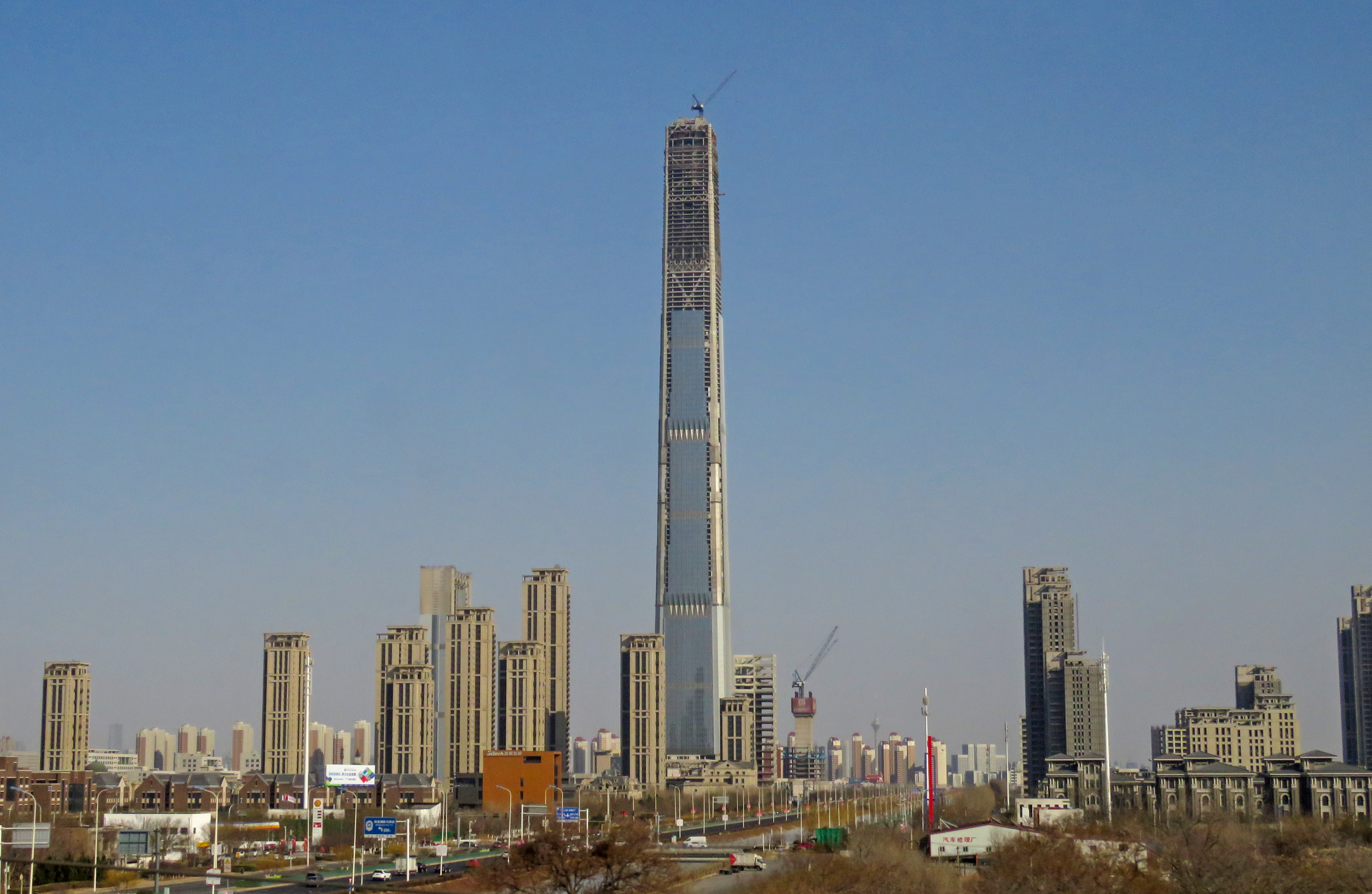
- Goldin Finance 117 under construction
- Coordinates: 39°08′28″N 117°00′32″E
- Country: People's Republic of China
- Municipality: Tianjin
- Township-level divisions: 2 subdistricts 7 towns

Area
  - Total: 545 km^{2} (210 sq mi)
- Elevation: 6 m (20 ft)

Population (2020 census)
  - Total: 1,180,770
  - Density: 2,170/km^{2} (5,610/sq mi)
- Time zone: UTC+8 (China Standard)
- Postal code: 300380
- Area code: 0022
Tianjin district map
Subdivisions of Tianjin
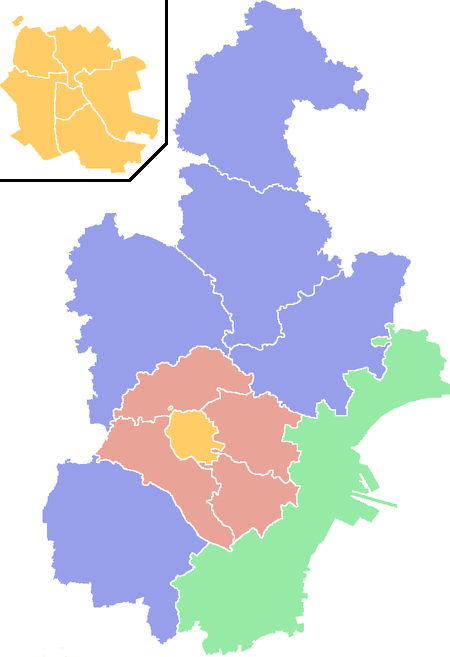
Core districts See inset
1	Heping
2	Hedong
3	Hexi
4	Nankai
5	Hebei
6	Hongqiao
Suburbs
7	Dongli
8	Xiqing
9	Jinnan
10	Beichen
Binhai and Rural
13	Binhai	14	Ninghe
11	Wuqing	15	Jinghai
12	Baodi	16	Ji Zhou
- Website: xq.gov.cn

Xiqing District (simplified Chinese: 西青区; traditional Chinese: 西青區; pinyin: Xīqīng Qū) is a district in Tianjin, People's Republic of China.

== History ==
The current Xiqing area came into existence in the mid and late Tang dynasty. In Northern Song (Song dynasty) period, this area was the border of Song and Liao (Liao dynasty). In Ming dynasty, this area was under control of Jinghai County and Wuqing County, Hejian Fu. In Qing dynasty, it was governed by Tianjin Fu. In 1912, after the founding of Republic of China, this area was named Tianjin County, Zhili Province.

After 1949, it became a special area of Hebei province and Yangliuqing became its center of governance. In 1952, this area became part of Tianjin Municipality. In 1953, it got its name Xijiaoqu (West Suburb). In 1992, it was named Xiqing District.

== Geography ==
Xiqing District is located in the southwest of Tianjin Municipality, on the east bordering Hongqiao District, Nankai District, Hexi District, and Jinnan District, to the south across the Duliujian River facing Jinghai District, on the west bordering Wuqing District and Bazhou, Hebei, to the north sharing Ziya River with Beichen District.

== Administrative divisions ==
There are 5 subdistricts and 7 towns in the district:

Name	Chinese (S)	Hanyu Pinyin	Population (2010)	Area (km^{2})
Liqizhuang Subdistrict	李七庄街道	Lǐqīzhuāng Jiēdào	74,762	54
Xiyingmen Subdistrict	西营门街道	Xīyíngmén Jiēdào	30,216	20.92
Chilongnan Subdistrict	赤龙南街道	Chìlóngnán Jiēdào	N/A	
Chilongbei Subdistrict	赤龙北街道	Chìlóngběi Jiēdào	N/A	
Jinmenhu Subdistrict	津门湖街道	Jīnménhú Jiēdào	N/A	
Yangliuqing town	杨柳青镇	Yángliǔqīng Zhèn	118,291	64
Jingwu town	精武镇	Jīngwǔ Zhèn	49,176	57.02
Zhangjiawo town	张家窝镇	Zhāngjiāwō Zhèn	47,786	44.5
Wangwenzhuang town	王稳庄镇	Wángwěnzhuāng Zhèn	41,363	116
Zhongbei town	中北镇	Zhōngběi Zhèn	92,814	38.5
Xinkou town	辛口镇	Xīnkǒu Zhèn	42,274	51.13
Dasi town	大寺镇	Dàsì Zhèn	113,290	86
developmental zones			11,133	

The total population of Xiqing is 310,000, among which 240,000 are rural citizens.

== Transportation ==
=== Metro ===
Xiqing is currently served by two metro lines operated by Tianjin Metro:

- Line 2 - Caozhuang
- Line 3 - Nanzhan, Yangwuzhuang, Xuefugonguequ, Gaoxinqu, Daxuecheng

== Education ==
Tianjin Korean International School (천진한국국제학교; 天津韩国国际学校) is located in the district.
