= Xinkou =

Town of Tianjin, China

Xinkou Town 辛口镇
- Town
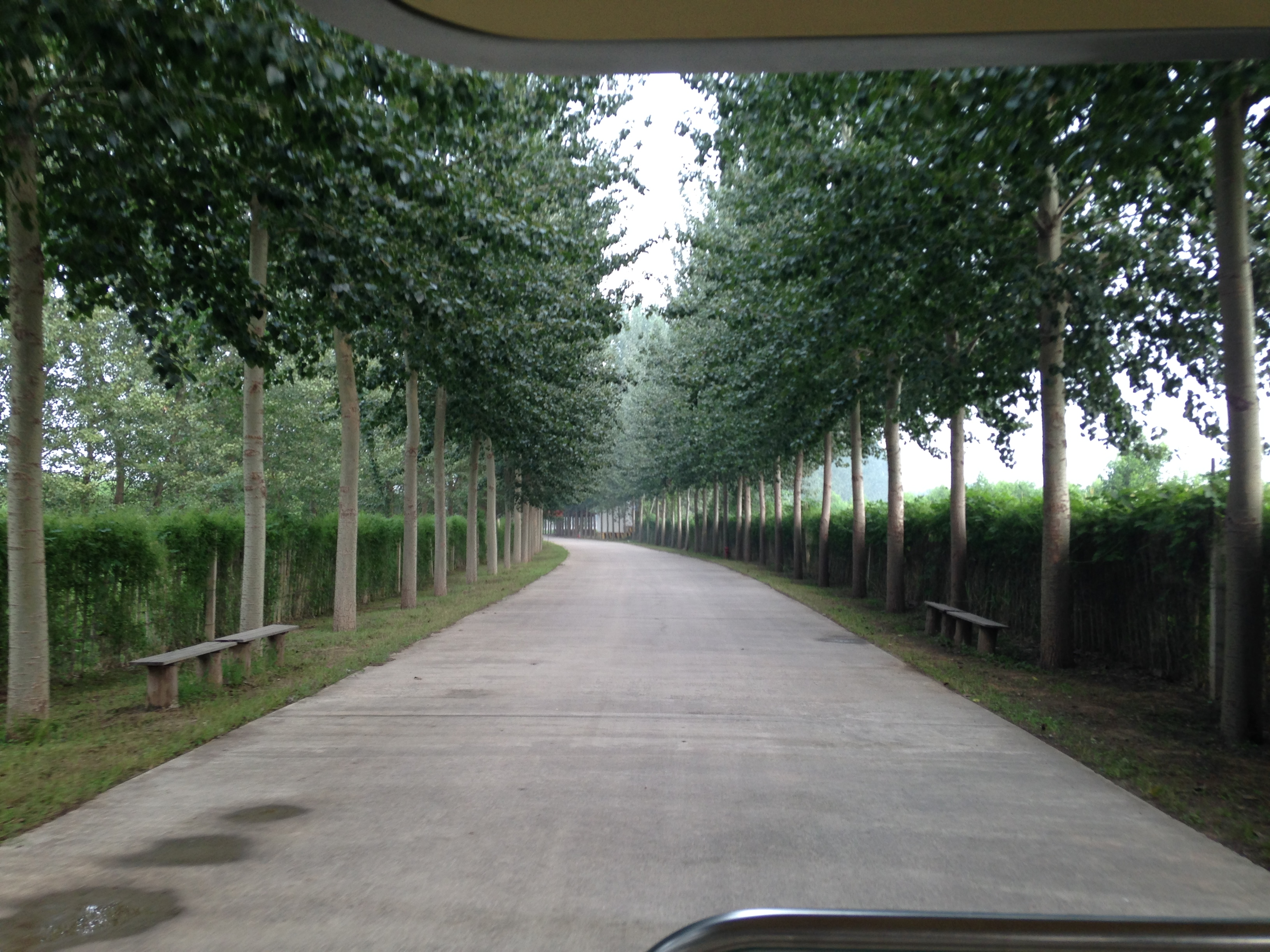
- Shuigaozhuang Park on the west of the town, 2016

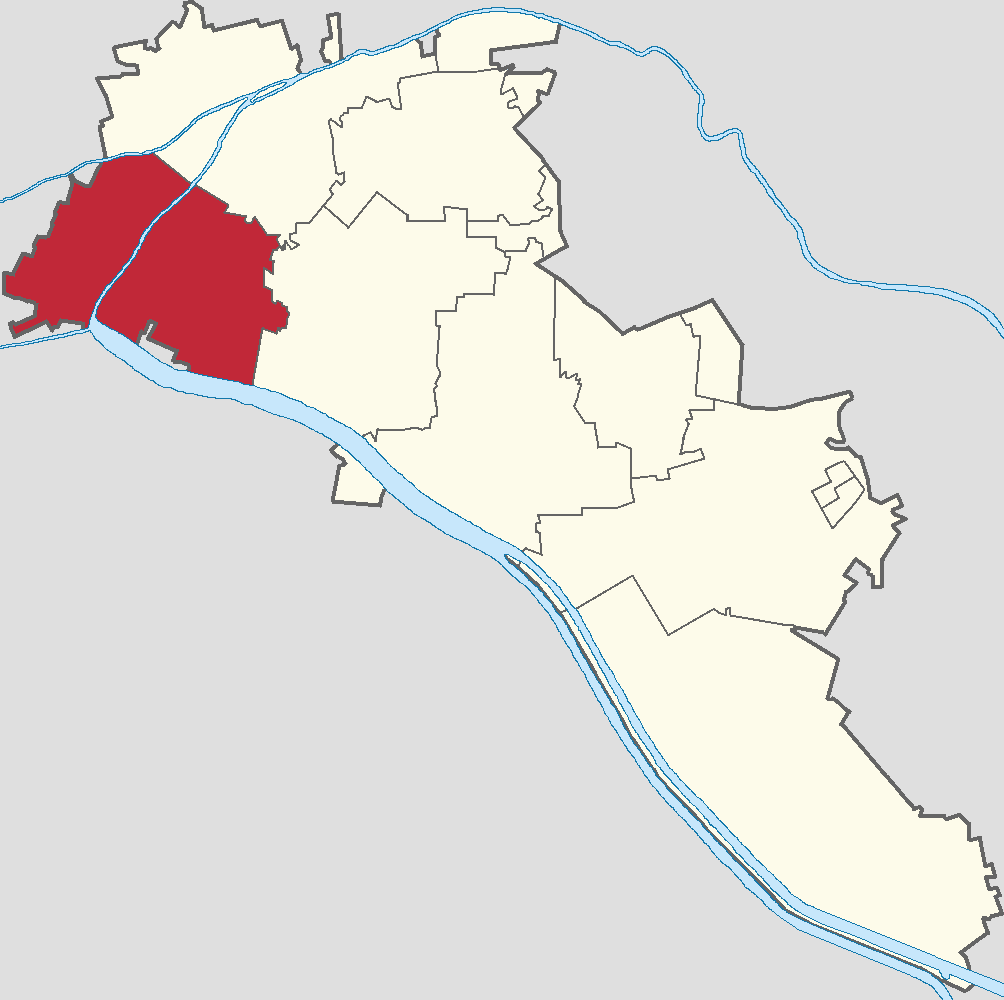
- Location in Xiqing District

- Location within Tianjin Location within China
- Coordinates: 39°05′20″N 116°57′52″E
- Country: China
- Municipality: Tianjin
- District: Xiqing
- Village-level Divisions: 2 communities 18 villages

Area
  - Total: 61.88 km^{2} (23.89 sq mi)
- Elevation: 4 m (13 ft)

Population (2010)
  - Total: 42,274
  - Density: 683.2/km^{2} (1,769/sq mi)
- Time zone: UTC+8 (CST)
- Postal code: 300386
- Area code: 022

Xinkou Town (simplified Chinese: 辛口镇; traditional Chinese: 辛口鎮; pinyin: Xīnkǒu Zhèn) is a town situated in the southwestern part of Xiqing District, Tianjin, China. It shares a border with Yangliuqing Town to its north, Zhangjiawo Town to its east, Liangwangzhuang Township and Duliu Town to its south, and Yangfengang Town to its west. Its census population is 42,274 in 2010.

The name "Xinkou" comes from Xinkou Village that predated the town.

== Geography ==
Xinkou Town is situated on the north of Duliujian River and east of Ziya River. The National Highway 104 traverses through the western part of the town.

== History ==
Timeline of Xinkou Town
Time	Status	Within
Song dynasty		Qianning County
Jin dynasty		Huichuan County
Yuan dynasty		Jinghai County
Ming and Qing Dynasties	Xinkou Village	Jinghai County
1912–1949	Xinkou Village	12th District, Jinghai County
1949–1958	Xinkou Village	10th District, Jinghai County
1958–1960	Yangliuqing People's Commune	Jinghai County, Hebei
1960–1962	Yangliuqing People's Commune	Nankai District, Tianjin
1962–1969	Yangliuqing People's Commune	Xijiao District, Tianjin
1969–1983	Muchang People's Commune	Xijiao District, Tianjin
1983–1984	Muchang Township	Xijiao District, Tianjin
1984–1992	Shang Xinkou Township	Xijiao District, Tianjin
1992–1997	Shang Xinkou Township	Xiqing District, Tianjin
1997–present	Xinkou Town	Xiqing District, Tianjin

== Administrative divisions ==
As of 2022, Xinkou Town has 20 subdivisions, consisting of 2 residential communities and 18 villages. They are, by the order of their Administrative Division Codes:

Subdivision names	Name transliterations	Type
新惠园	Xinhui Yuan	Community
新旺园	Xinwang Yuan	Community
上辛口	Shang Xinkou	Village
当城	Dang Cheng	Village
水高庄	Shuigao Zhuang	Village
第六埠	Diliu Bu	Village
中辛口	Zhong Xinkou	Village
下辛口	Xia Xinkou	Village
郑庄子	Zheng Zhuangzi	Village
郭庄子	Guo Zhuangzi	Village
木厂	Muchang	Village
冯高庄	Fenggao Zhuang	Village
大沙沃	Da Shawo	Village
小沙沃	Xiao Shawo	Village
大杜庄	Da Duzhuang	Village
小杜庄	Xiao Duzhuang	Village
宣家院	Xuanjia Yuan	Village
毕家村	Bijia Cun	Village
王家村	Wangjia Cun	Village
岳家开	Yuejiakai	Village

== See also ==
- List of township-level divisions of Tianjin
