= Chilongnan Subdistrict =

Subdistrict of Tianjin, China

Chilongnan Subdistrict 赤龙南街道
- Subdistrict
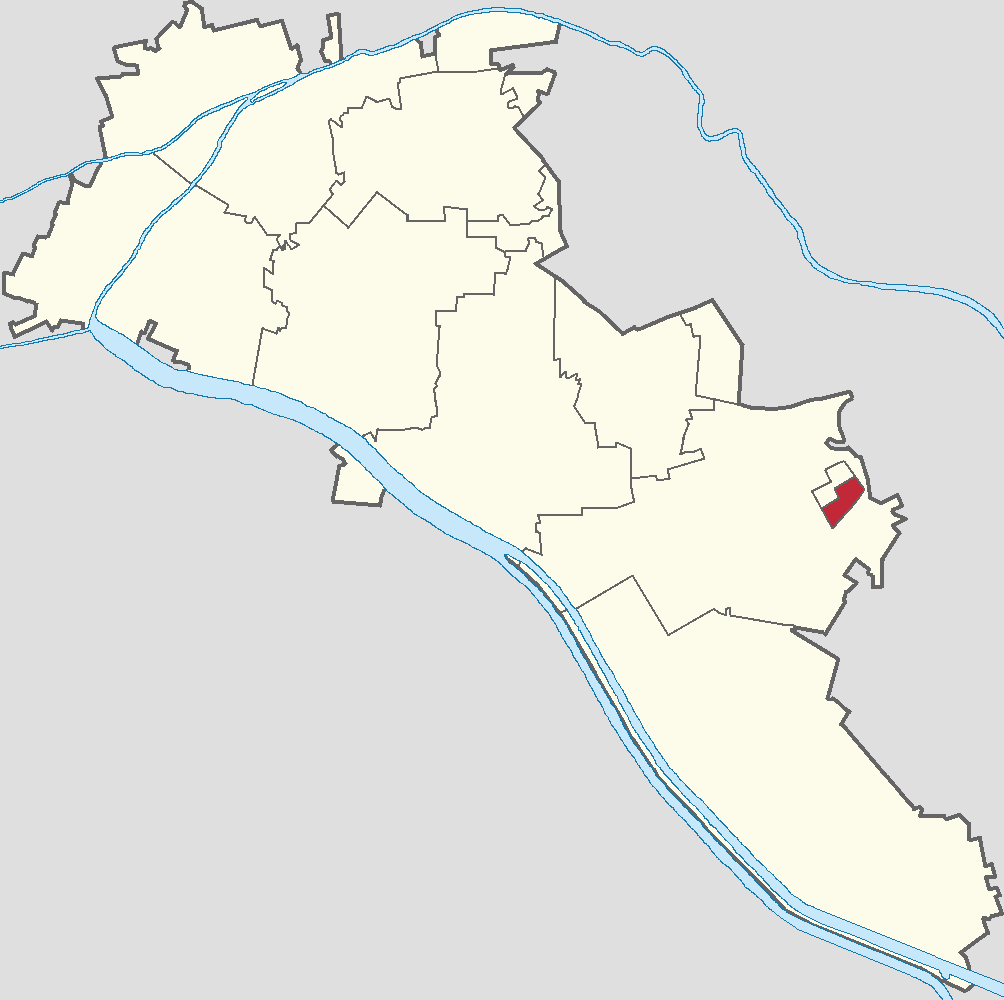
- Location of Chilongnan Subdistrict in Xiqing District

- Location within Tianjin Location within China
- Coordinates: 38°59′37″N 117°15′46″E
- Country: China
- Municipality: Tianjin
- District: Xiqing
- Village-level Divisions: 4 communities

Area
  - Total: 3.03 km^{2} (1.17 sq mi)
- Elevation: 3 m (9.8 ft)
- Time zone: UTC+8 (CST)
- Postal code: 300385
- Area code: 022

Chilongnan Subdistrict (simplified Chinese: 赤龙南街道; traditional Chinese: 赤龍南街道; pinyin: Chìlóngnán Jiēdào) is a subdistrict situated on Northeastern Xiqing District, Tianjin, China. It shares border with Chilongbei Subdistrict to the northwest, and is surrounded by Dasi Town in the other directions.

The subdistrict was formed in 2016 and its name literally means "Red Dragon South".

== Administrative divisions ==
In 2022, Chilongnan Subdistrict consists of the following 4 residential communities:

Subdivision names	Name transliterations
佳和雅庭	Jiahe Yating
佳和荣庭	Jiahe Rongting
佳和贤庭	Jiahe Xianting
亲和康园	Qinhe Kangyuan

== See also ==
- List of township-level divisions of Tianjin
