= Chilongbei Subdistrict =

Subdistrict of Tianjin, China

Chilongbei Subdistrict 赤龙北街道
- Subdistrict
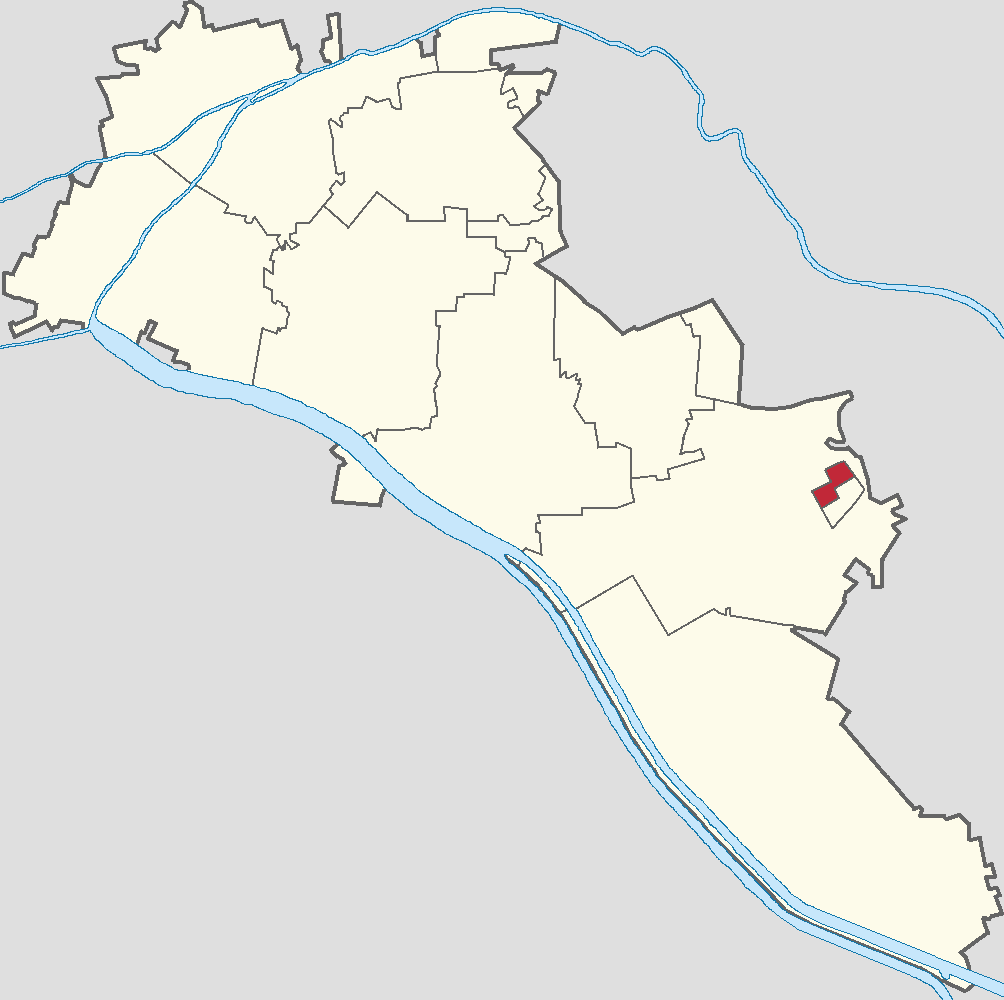
- Location in Xiqing District

- Location within Tianjin Location within China
- Coordinates: 39°00′36″N 117°15′33″E
- Country: China
- Municipality: Tianjin
- District: Xiqing
- Village-level Divisions: 1 community
- Elevation: 3 m (9.8 ft)
- Time zone: UTC+8 (CST)
- Postal code: 300385
- Area code: 022

Chilongbei Subdistrict (simplified Chinese: 赤龙北街道; traditional Chinese: 赤龍北街道; pinyin: Chìlóngběi Jiēdào) is a subdistrict located in the Northeastern section of Xiqing District, Tianjin, China. It shares a border with Chilongnan Subdistrict to the southeast, and is surrounded by Dasi Town in all other directions.

The subdistrict was created in 2016, and the name can be translated as "Red Dragon North".

== Administrative divisions ==
At the end of 2022, Chilongbei Subdistrict covered one subdivision: Caihongcheng residential community.

== See also ==
- List of township-level divisions of Tianjin
