= Xiyingmen Subdistrict =

Subdistrict of Tianjin, China

Xiyingmen Subdistrict 西营门街道
- Subdistrict
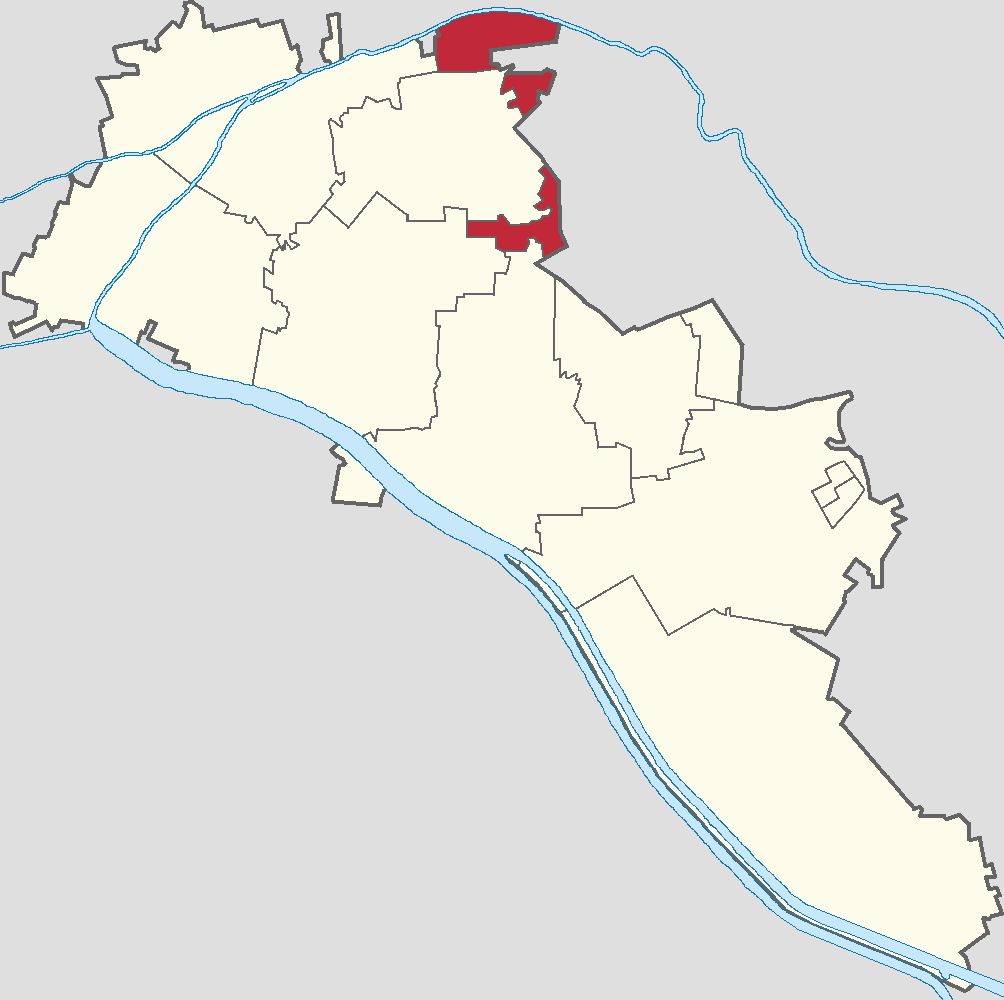
- Location within Xiqing District

- Location within Tianjin Location within China
- Coordinates: 39°09′03″N 117°05′19″E
- Country: China
- Municipality: Tianjin
- District: Xiqing
- Village-level Divisions: 14 communities

Area
  - Total: 16.05 km^{2} (6.20 sq mi)
- Elevation: 4 m (13 ft)

Population (2010)
  - Total: 30,216
  - Density: 1,883/km^{2} (4,876/sq mi)
- Time zone: UTC+8 (China Standard)
- Postal code: 300112
- Area code: 022

Xiyingmen Subdistrict (simplified Chinese: 西营门街道; traditional Chinese: 西營門街道; pinyin: Xīyíngmén Jiēdào) is a subdistrict located in northern Xiqing District, Tianjin, China. It shares a border with Jialingdao Subdistrict to its north, Wangdingdi Subdistrict to its east, Zhangjiawo and Jingwu Towns to its south, and Zhongbei Town to its west. In addition, it has two exclaves on the north of Zhongbei Town. As of 2010, the subdistrict is home to 30,216 people.

Its name Xiyingmen (Chinese: 西营门; lit. 'West Camp Gate') is referring to its historical location and the west entrance of the then army garrison in Tianjin.

== History ==
Timeline of Xiyingmen Subdistrict
Years	Status	Within
1958 - 1961	Part of Jinxi People's commune and Weinan People's Commune	Nankai District, Tianjin
1961 - 1962	Xiyingmen People's Commune	Nankai District, Tianjin
1962 - 1983	Xiyingmen People's Commune	Xijiao District. Tianjin
1983 - 1992	Xiyingmen Township	Xijiao District. Tianjin
1992 - 1998	Xiyingmen Township	Xiqing District, Tianjin
1998 - present	Xiyingmen Subdistrict	Xiqing District, Tianjin

== Administrative divisions ==
In 2022, Xiyingmen Subdistrict consists of 14 residential communities. They are listed below:

Administrative division code	Subdivision names	Name transliterations
120111001001	小稍直口	Xiao Shaozhikou
120111001002	春畅里	Chunchang Li
120111001003	文瑞家园	Wenrui Jiayuan
120111001008	杨柳青农场	Yangliuqing Nongchang
120111001009	利海家园	Lihai Jiayuan
120111001010	王顶堤家园	Wangdingdi Jiayuan
120111001011	怡和新村	Yihe Xincun
120111001012	冬云家园	Dongyun Jiayuan
120111001013	慧轩家园	Huixuan Jiayuan
120111001014	华城景苑	Huacheng Jingyuan
120111001015	嘉汇园	Jiahui Yuan
120111001016	官易里	Guanyi Li
120111001017	跃升里	Yuesheng Li
120111001018	津洲花园	Jinzhou Huayuan

== See also ==
- List of township-level divisions of Tianjin
