= Liqizhuang Subdistrict =

Subdistrict of Tianjin, China

Liqizhuang Subdistrict 李七庄街道
- Subdistrict
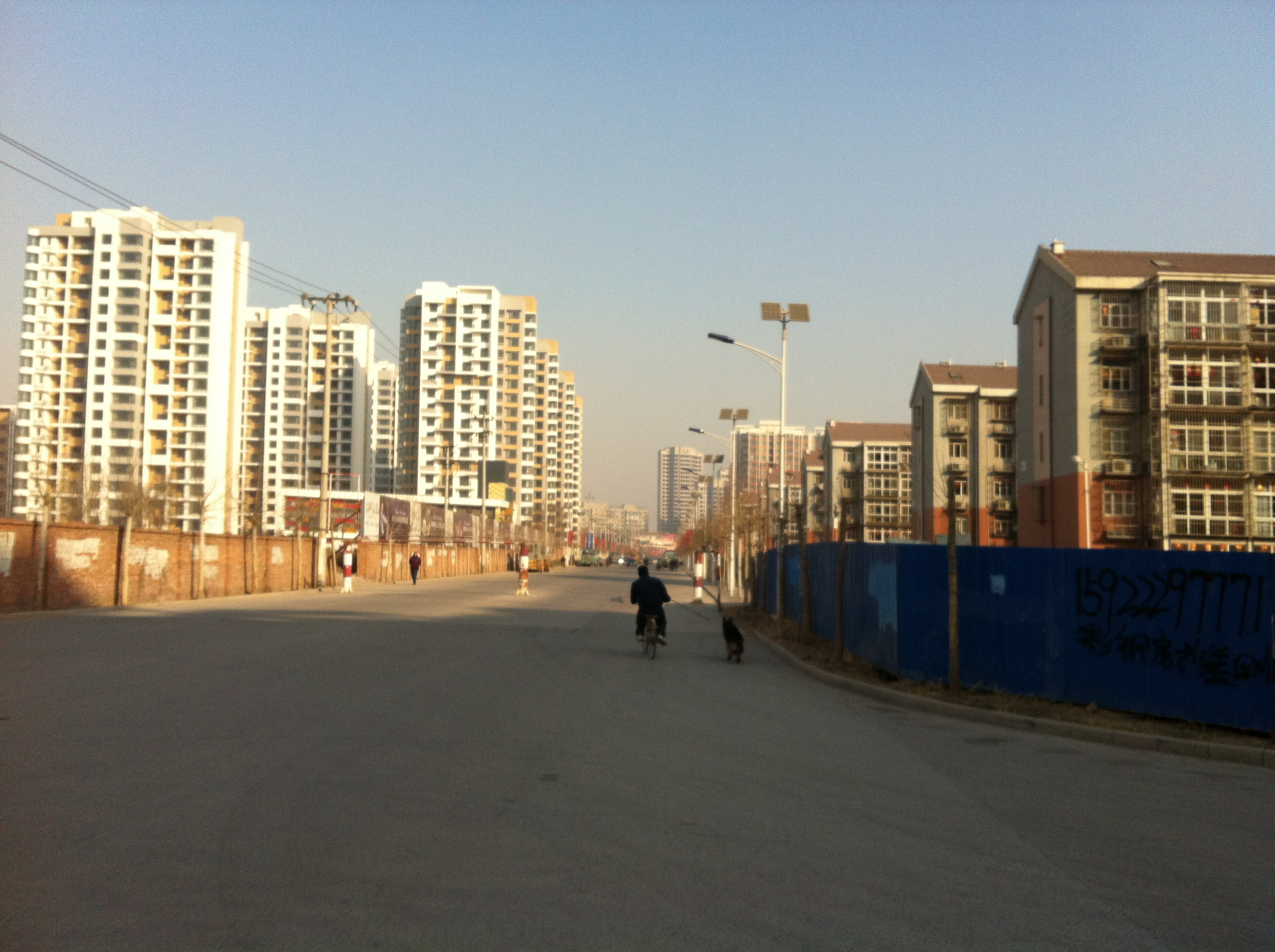
- Guangming Road on the western portion of the subdistrict, 2012

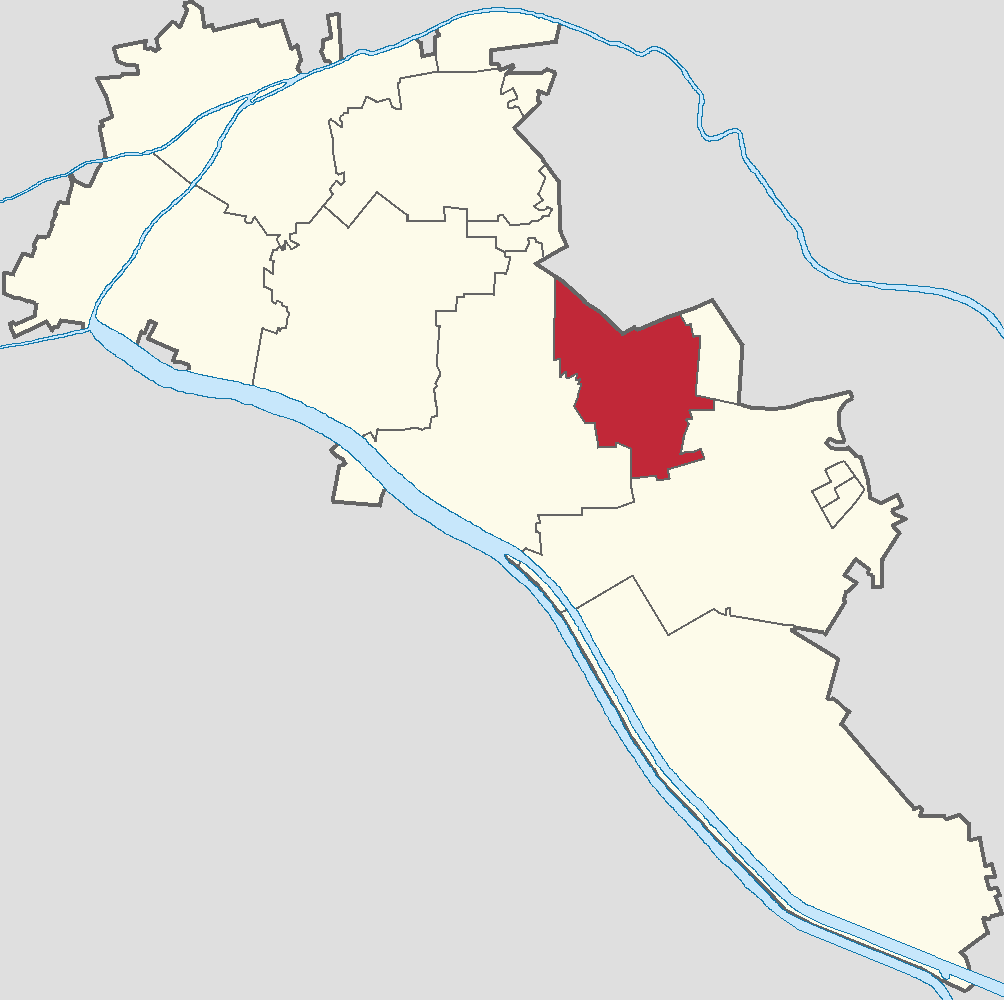
- Location inside of Xiqing District

- Location within Tianjin Location within China
- Coordinates: 39°04′06″N 117°10′36″E
- Country: China
- Municipality: Tianjin
- District: Xiqing
- Village-level Divisions: 20 communities 13 villages

Area
  - Total: 36.9 km^{2} (14.2 sq mi)
- Elevation: 3 m (9.8 ft)

Population (2010)
  - Total: 74,762
  - Density: 2,030/km^{2} (5,250/sq mi)
- Time zone: UTC+8 (CST)
- Postal code: 300384
- Area code: 022

Liqizhuang Subdistrict (simplified Chinese: 李七庄街道; traditional Chinese: 李七莊街道; pinyin: Lǐqīzhuāng Jiēdào) is a subdistrict located in the northern side of Xiqing District, Tianjin, China. It borders Huayuan and Tiyuzhongxin Subdistricts to its north, Jinmenhu Subdistrict and Dasi Town to its east, and Jingwu Town to its southwest. The subdistrict has a population of 74,762 as of the 2010 census.

The name Liqizhuang (Chinese: 李七庄; lit. 'Li Seven Village') comes from the Liqizhuang Village that used to exist in the region.

== History ==
Timeline of Liqizhuang's History
Years	Status	Part of
1958 - 1962	Within Dongfeng People's Commune	Heping District, Tianjin
1962 - 1963	Within Weinan People's Commune	Xijiao District, Tianjin
1963 - 1964	Xinyuan People's Commune; Liqizhuang People's Commune; Liyuantou People's Commune	Xijiao District, Tianjin
1964 - 1969	Liqizhuang People's Commune; Liyuantou People's Commune	Xijiao District, Tianjin
1969 - 1983	Liqizhuang People's Commune	Xijiao District, Tianjin
1983 - 1992	Liqizhuang Township	Xijiao District, Tianjin
1992 - 2001	Liqizhuang Township	Xiqing District, Tianjin
2001 - present	Liqizhuang Subdistrict	Xiqing District, Tianjin

== Administrative divisions ==
As of 2023, Liqizhuang Subdistrict consists of 33 subdivisions, of those 20 are residential communities and 13 are villages. They are listed in the table below:

Administrative division code	Subdivision names	Name transliterations	Type
120111002001	津涞花园	Jinlai Huayuan	Community
120111002002	锦棠苑	Jintang Yuan	Community
120111002003	集贤里	Jixian Li	Community
120111002004	瑞城嘉园	Ruicheng Jiayuan	Community
120111002006	杨楼	Yanglou	Community
120111002007	朗庭园	Langting Yuan	Community
120111002008	宏城御溪园	Hongcheng Yuxi Yuan	Community
120111002009	松江城	Songjiang Cheng	Community
120111002013	天房美域	Tianfang Meiyu	Community
120111002014	新都庄园	Xindu Zhuangyuan	Community
120111002016	锦程嘉苑	Jincheng Jiayuan	Community
120111002018	邓店	Dengdian	Community
120111002019	王兰庄	Wanglan Zhuang	Community
120111002020	和瑞园	Herui Yuan	Community
120111002021	浩宇苑	Haoyu Yuan	Community
120111002022	东第家园	Dongdi Jiayuan	Community
120111002023	凌庄子	Lingzhuangzi	Community
120111002024	盛阳园	Shengyang Yuan	Community
120111002025	保富国际	Baofu Guoji	Community
120111002201	边村	Bian Cun	Village
120111002202	程村	Cheng Cun	Village
120111002204	于台	Yutai	Village
120111002205	王台	Wangtai	Village
120111002206	蔡台	Caitai	Village
120111002207	辛院	Xinyuan	Village
120111002208	武台	Wutai	Village
120111002210	凌口	Lingkou	Village
120111002212	高庄子	Gaozhuangzi	Village
120111002213	小倪庄	Xiaonie Zhuang	Village
120111002214	大倪庄	Danie Zhuang	Village
120111002215	王姑娘庄	Wangguniang Zhuang	Village
120111002216	梨园头	Liyuantou	Village
120111002410	天津理工大学（主校区）	Tianjin Ligong Daxue (Zhuxiaoqu)	Community

== Galleries ==
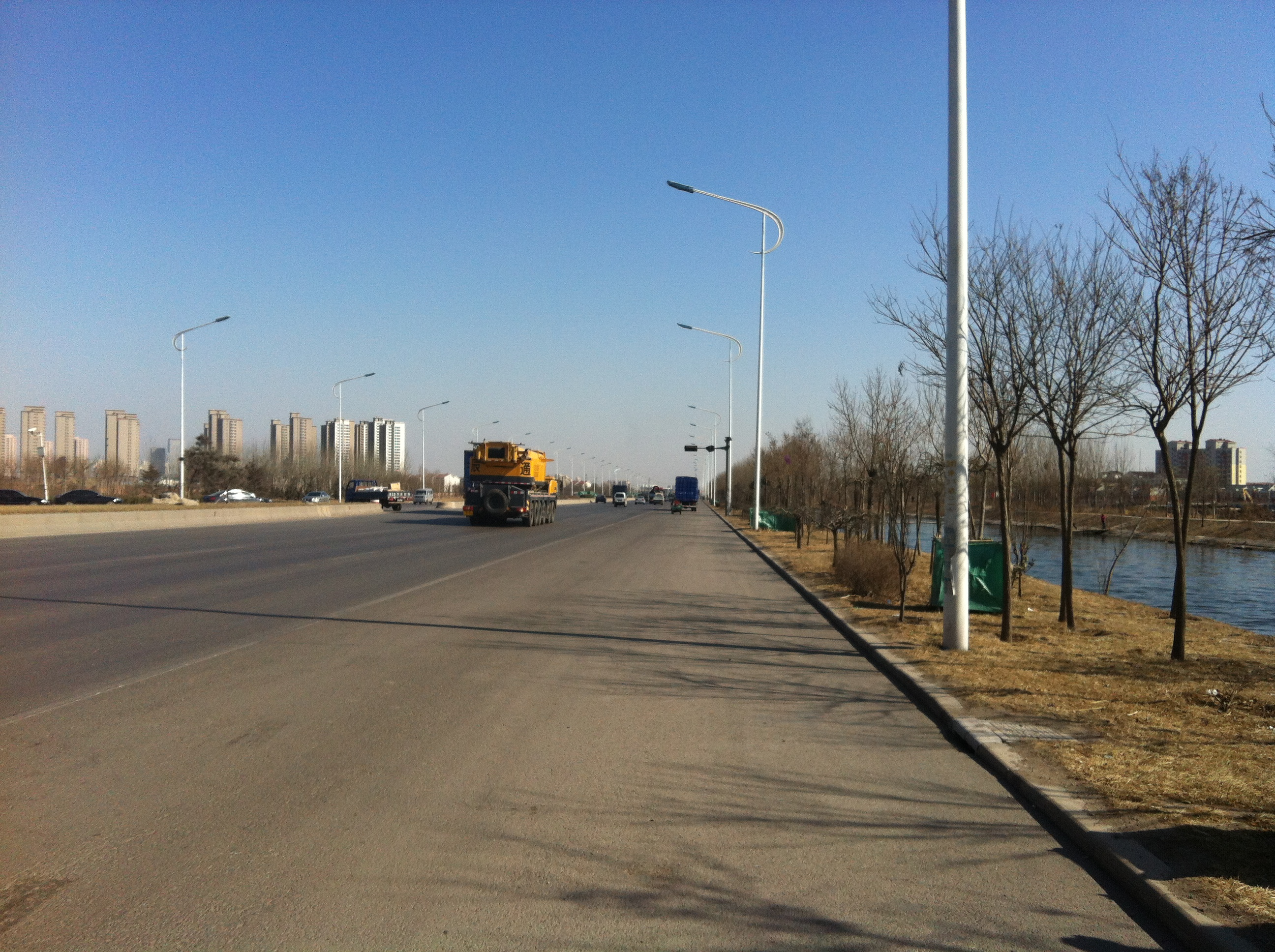
Outer Ring West Road that passes through the subdistrict, 2012

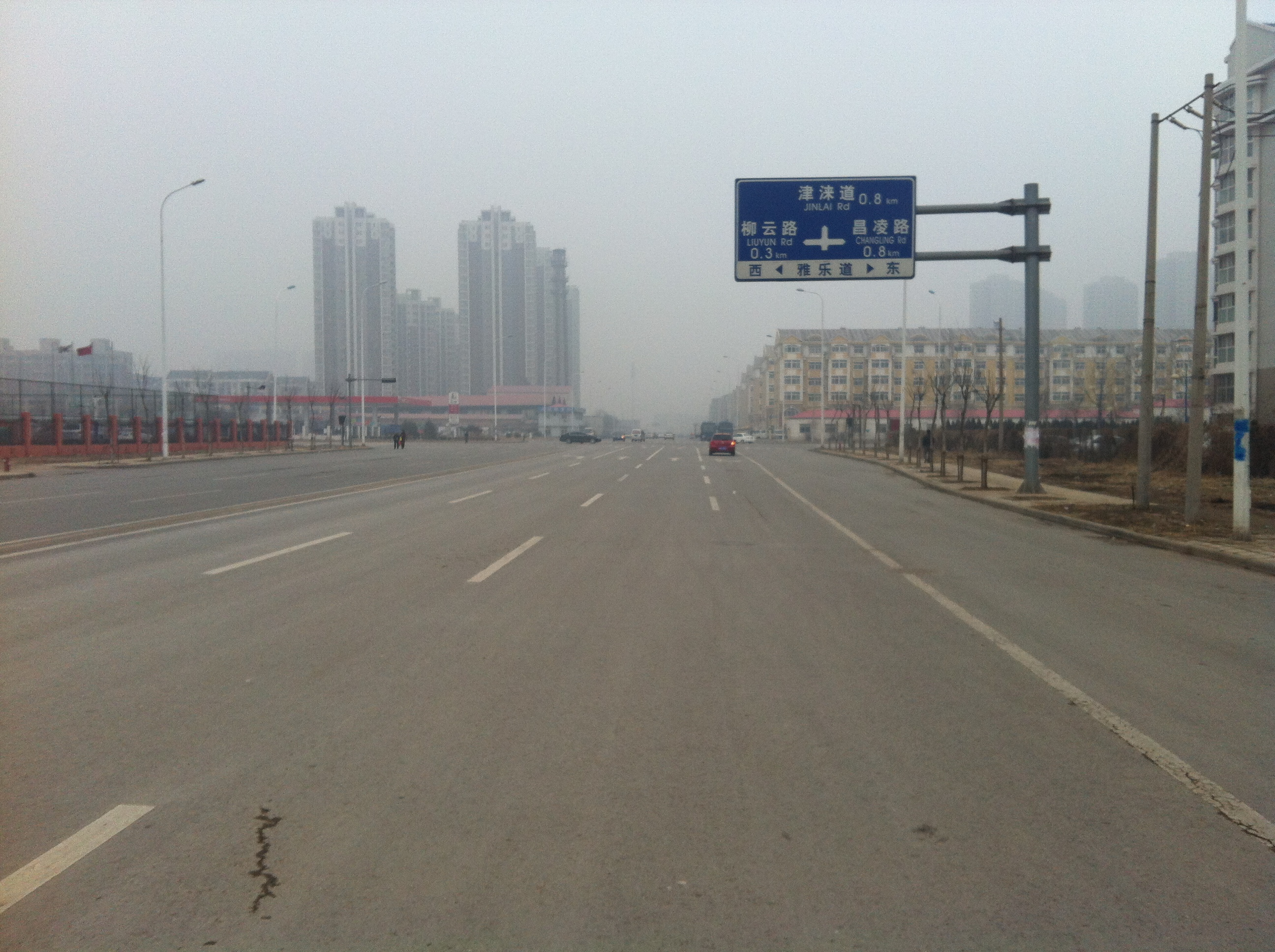
Yaohuan Road within Liqizhuang, 2012

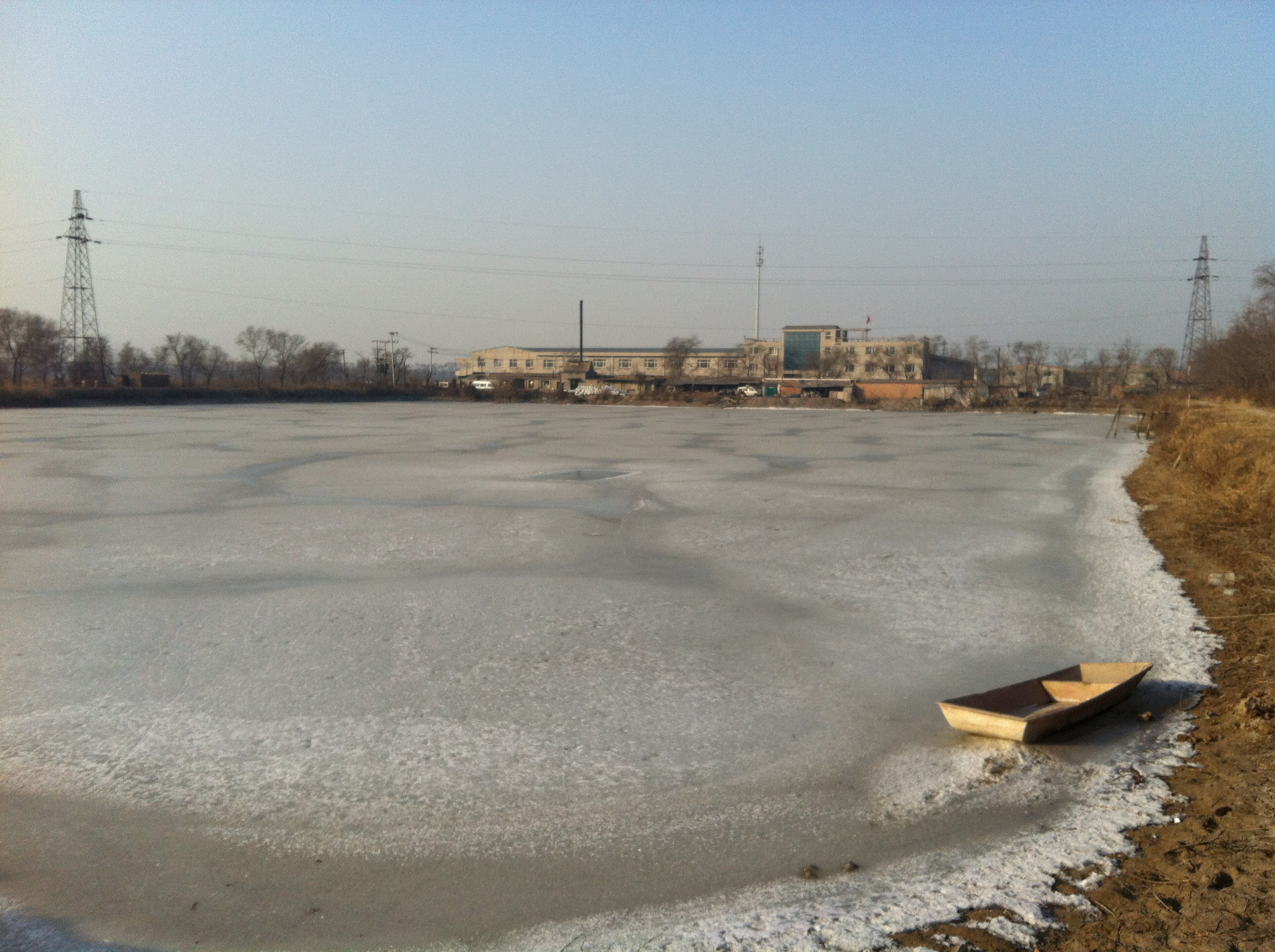
An artificial lake in winter, near the Dagu Paishui River,

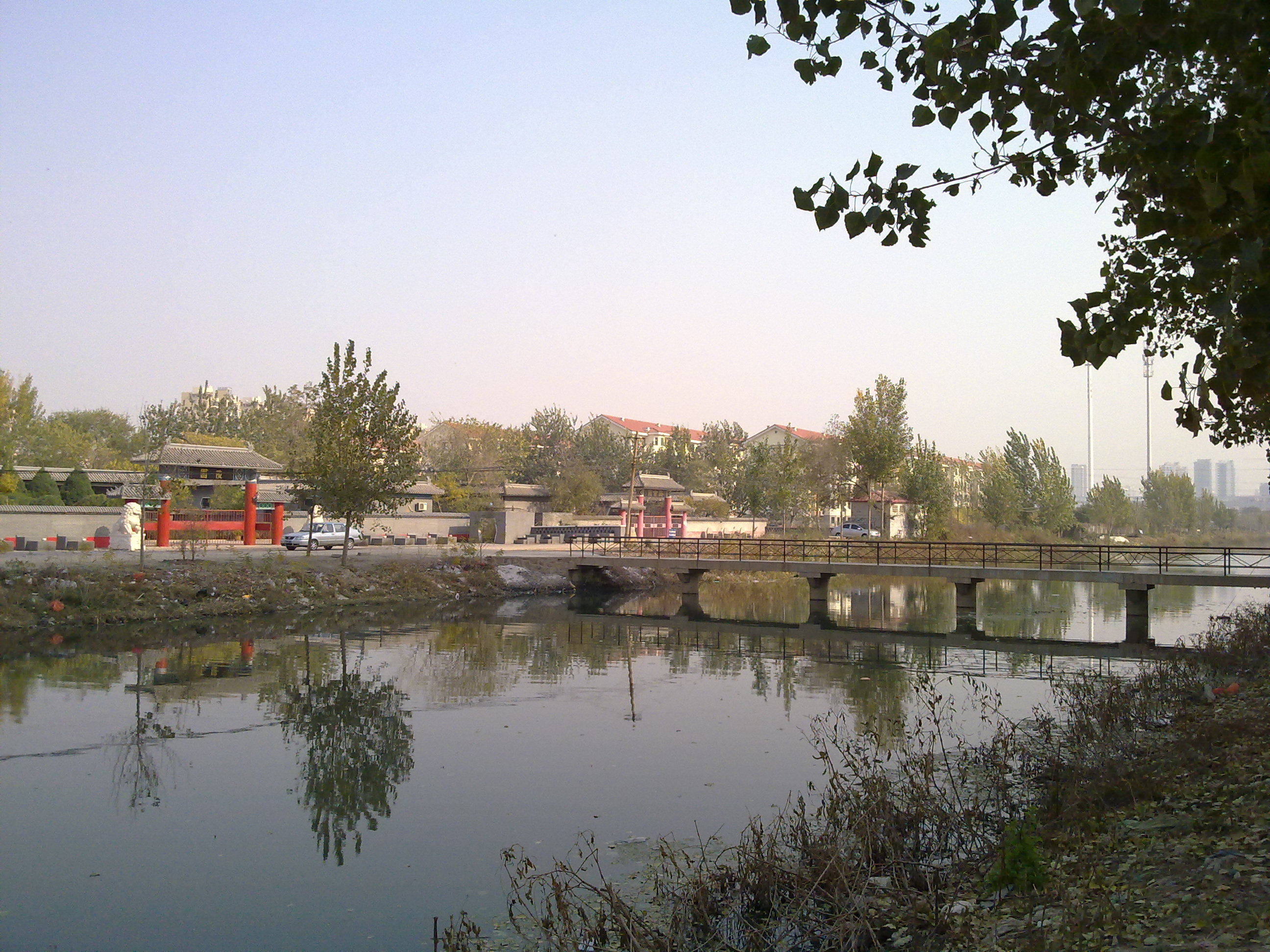
Fengchan River, 2013

== See also ==
- List of township-level divisions of Tianjin
