= List of prisons in Tianjin =

This is a list of prisons within Tianjin municipality of the People's Republic of China.

== Prison ==
Name	Enterprise name	City/County/District/Prefecture	Village/Town	Established	Notes
Gangbei Prison	Tianjin Municipal Oil Pump Factory		Dagang District		Produces BJ130 automobile air cylinder sets
Hexi Prison	Tianjin Malleable Iron Plant				About 2,000 inmates
Jinxi Prison			Yangliuqing		
Ligang Prison	No. 2 Tianjin Malleable Iron Plant	Xiqing District			
Liyuan Prison	Tianjin No. 2 Malleable Iron Plant, Tianjin Xinxing Valve Plant	Xiqing District			
Tianjin Municipal Prison	Tianjin Hinge Works	Xiqing District	Dasi	1903	Primarily detains death-sentence prisoners as well as prisoners with stiff sentences
Tianjin Municipal Women's Prison	Xinhua Industrial General Factory	Nankai District	Liqizhuang		
Xiqing Prison	Garment Factory	Xiqing District		1988	More than 1,100 prisoners
Yangliuqing Prison		Xiqing District	Yangliuqing		

== Detention Center ==
Name	Enterprise name	City/County/District/Prefecture	Village/Town	Established	Notes
Tianjin No.1 Detention Center 天津市第一看守所		Dayan Village, Zhongbei, Xiqing 天津市西青区中北镇大卞庄村			
Tianjin No.2 Detention Center 天津市第二看守所		Dayan Village, Zhongbei, Xiqing 天津市西青区中北镇大卞庄村			
Tianjin Port Detention Center 天津港看守所		No. 537 Gangnei Changxi Road, No. 2 Xingang Road, Tanggu, Binhai New Area 天津市滨海新区塘沽新港二号路港内厂西路537号			
Tiecheng Branch Detention Center, Tianjin Public Security Bureau 天津市公安局铁城分局看守所		Tiecheng Branch, Tiantie Group, Shexian County, Handan City, Hebei Province 河北省邯郸市涉县天铁集团铁城分局			
Temporary Detention Center No.1, Railway Tianjin Public Security Office 铁路天津公安处看守所(暂送一所)		Dayan Village, Zhongbei, Xiqing 天津市西青区中北镇大卞庄村			
Heping Detention Center 和平区看守所		No. 218 Jinyu Road (at the intersection with Zhao Road), Beichen 天津市北辰区津榆公路218号（津榆公路与中赵路交口赵庄）			
Hedong Detention Center 河东区看守所		Inside the Hedong Branch Courtyard, Laoshan Road Extension, Wanxin Village, Hedong 河东区万新村崂山道延长线河东分局院内			
Hexi Detention Center 河西区看守所		Intersection of Dongting Road and Wushui Road, Hexi 洞庭路与浯水道交口			
Nankai Detention Center 南开区看守所		No. 10 Huaping Road, Nankai 南开区华坪路10号			
Hebei Detention Center 河北区看守所		Pujihe East Road, Beichen 天津市北辰区普济河东道			
Hongqiao Detention Center 红桥区看守所		No. 217 Guangrong Road, Hongqiao 天津市红桥区光荣道217号			
Dongli Detention Center 东丽区看守所		Feng'an Road, Fengnian Village, Dongli 天津市东丽区丰年村丰安路			
Xiqing Detention Center 西青区看守所		No. 115 Liukou Road, Yangliuqing, Xiqing 杨柳青柳口路115号			
Beichen Detention Center 北辰区看守所		Beichen Road, Beichen 天津市北辰区北辰道			
Jinnan Detention Center 津南区看守所		Sandao, Beizhakou, Jinnan 天津市津南区北闸口镇三道			
Wuqing Detention Center 武清区看守所		Jichang Road, Yangcun, Wuqing 武清区杨村镇机场道			
Baodi Detention Center 宝坻区看守所		No. 2 Huancheng North Road, Chengguan, Baodi 宝坻县城关镇环城北路2号			
Binhai No.1 Detention Center 滨海新区第一看守所		No. 8 Xintang Road, Tanggu, Binhai New Area 天津市塘沽区新塘道8号			
Binhai No.2 Detention Center 滨海新区第二看守所		No. 56 Taiping Street, Hangu, Binhai New Area 汉沽区太平街56号			
Binhai No.3 Detention Center 滨海新区第三看守所		No. 4 Xiaguang Road, Dagang, Binhai New Area 天津市大港区霞光路4号			
Ninghe Detention Center 宁河区看守所		No. 12 Yanhe Road, Lutai, Ninghe 天津市宁河县芦台镇沿河路12号			
Jinghai Detention Center 静海区看守所		No. 28 Jingwen Road, Jinghai, Jinghai 天津市静海县静海镇静文路28			
Jizhou Detention Center 蓟州区看守所		Baota Road, East of City, Bangxi Highway, Jizhou 蓟州区邦喜公路（城东）宝塔路			

== See also ==
Tianjin State Security Bureau

== Sources ==
- "Laogai Handbook 2007-2008" (PDF) (in Chinese and English). Washington, D.C.: Laogai Research Foundation. October 2008. pp. 461–466. ISBN 978-1-931550-25-3.
