= G0111 Qinhuangdao–Binzhou Expressway =

Expressway in Hebei, Tianjin and Shandong provinces of China

Qinhuangdao–Binzhou Expressway
- 秦皇岛－滨州高速公路
- Qinbin Expressway 秦滨高速

Route information
- Auxiliary route of G1
- Length: 367 km (228 mi)

Major junctions
- North end: Qinhuangdao
- South end: Binzhou

Location
- Country: China

Highway system
- National Trunk Highway System; Primary; Auxiliary; National Highways; Transport in China
← G1	→ G0112

The Qinhuangdao–Binzhou Expressway (Chinese: 秦皇岛－滨州高速公路), designated as G0111 and commonly abbreviated as the Qinbin Expressway (Chinese: 秦滨高速), is an expressway in northeastern China linking the cities of Qinhuangdao and Binzhou through Tianjin. This expressway is a branch of G1 Jingha Expressway.

== Detailed facilities ==
District/County	City	Province	Location	km	Junction	Destinations	Notes
Funing	Qinhuangdao	Hebei	Daishantou		0	G1 – towards Haigang (east) / Lulong (west); Hebei S52 – towards Qinglong	
Funing	Qinhuangdao	Hebei	Qinhuangdao West			G102	
Beidaihe	Qinhuangdao	Hebei	Nandaihe			Funan Connection Road	
Beidaihe	Qinhuangdao	Hebei	Niutouya			Hebei S60 – towards Beidaihe	
Funing	Qinhuangdao	Hebei	Funing		Service Area	–	
Funing	Qinhuangdao	Hebei	Funing South			X633	
Changli	Qinhuangdao	Hebei	Changli East			S365	
Changli	Qinhuangdao	Hebei	Changli South			S261	
Changli	Qinhuangdao	Hebei	Beidaihe Airport			Hebei S62 – towards BPE	
Changli	Qinhuangdao	Hebei	Huangdianzhuang			X631	
Changli	Qinhuangdao	Hebei	Changli		Service Area	–	
Laoting	Tangshan	Hebei	Laoting East			S261	
Laoting	Tangshan	Hebei	Tanggang			Hebei S64 – towards Luannan (northwest) / Port of Jingtang (southeast)	
Laoting	Tangshan	Hebei	Laoting South			Laobei Highway	
Laoting	Tangshan	Hebei	Laoting		Service Area	–	
Luannan	Tangshan	Hebei	Luannan South			Guliu Highway (Xiwang Road); Limin Street	
Luannan	Tangshan	Hebei	Dingzhuanghu			Hebei S51 – towards Luannan (north) / Caofeidian (south)	
Caofeidian	Tangshan	Hebei	Tanghai North			G508	
Caofeidian	Tangshan	Hebei	Tanghai		Service Area	–	
Caofeidian	Tangshan	Hebei	Nanbao			Dajian Highway	
Caofeidian / Fengnan	Tangshan	Hebei	Nanbao			Hebei S57 – towards Fengnan (northwest) / Caofeidian (southeast)	
Fengnan	Tangshan	Hebei	Fengnan South			Fengjian Highway (Zuncao Highway)	
Binhai, Tianjin			Caofeidian		Service Area	–	westbound
Binhai, Tianjin			Jianhe		Service Area	–	
Binhai, Tianjin			Dashentang West			G2502 – towards Ninghe	
Binhai, Tianjin			Shuangqiao		Service Area	–	eastbound
Binhai, Tianjin			Caijiabao			Tianjin S11 – towards Beitang	eastbound entrance and westbound exit
Binhai, Tianjin			Hangu East			Hancai Road	eastbound exit and westbound entrance
Binhai, Tianjin			Hangu West			G228	
Xicheng, Beijing			Qinghenongchang East				
Binhai / Ninghe, Tianjin			Tangcheng Expwy Junction			Tianjin S21 – towards Qilihai	
Xicheng, Beijing / Ninghe, Tianjin			Qinghenongchang West			S506 Haiqing Highway	
Binhai, Tianjin			Huanggang			Tianjin S30 – towards Port of Tianjin (east) / Wuqing (west); Xinyuan Avenue	
Binhai, Tianjin			Tanggu		Service Area	–	
Binhai, Tianjin			Jiudajie			Beida Street	
Binhai, Tianjin			Binhai West			Tianjin S3 – towards Hedong	
Binhai, Tianjin			Xibuxincheng			Zhengtian Avenue	
Binhai, Tianjin			Zhuangfang			S. Zhuangfang Avenue	
Binhai, Tianjin			Binhai Ring Junction			Tianjin S85 – towards Guangang	
Binhai, Tianjin			Jingang		Parking Area	–	
Binhai, Tianjin			Jingang Expwy Junction			Tianjin S11 – towards Lingang	
Binhai, Tianjin			Qingfang Economical Area			G336	
Binhai, Tianjin			Qingfang		Service Area	–	
Binhai, Tianjin			Jianhe North			Haifang Road	
Binhai, Tianjin			Nangang Industrial Area			G0211 – towards Jinghai	
Binhai, Tianjin			Nangang			Hongqi Road	
Huanghua	Cangzhou, Hebei		Xigaotou		Police Check	–	northbound
Huanghua	Cangzhou, Hebei		Zhangjuhe			G228	
Huanghua	Cangzhou, Hebei		Zhongjie			SL24	
Huanghua	Cangzhou, Hebei		Bohai New Area		Service Area	–	
Huanghua	Cangzhou, Hebei		Xinqu North			SL50 Beishugang Road / Beijing Avenue	
Huanghua	Cangzhou, Hebei		Bohai New Area			G307 (Zhongshugang Road)	
Haixing / Huanghua	Cangzhou, Hebei		Huanghua Port			G1811 – towards Port of Huanghua (east) / Huanghua (west)	
Haixing	Cangzhou, Hebei		Haifeng			G228	
Wudi	Binzhou, Shandong		Wudichengkou				
Wudi	Binzhou, Shandong		Bingang				
Wudi	Binzhou, Shandong		Beihai		Parking Area	–	
Wudi	Binzhou, Shandong		Wudixixiaowang			S233	
Wudi	Binzhou, Shandong		Wudi East		Service Area	–	
Zhanhua	Binzhou, Shandong		Zhanhua North			S236	
Zhanhua	Binzhou, Shandong		Zhanhuasiyuanhu			G18 – towards Kenli (east) / Qingyun (west); Shandong S27 – towards Binzhou	
1.000 mi = 1.609 km; 1.000 km = 0.621 mi: Incomplete access; Proposed
