= China International Eco-City Forum =

China (Binhai Tianjin) International Eco-city Forum & Expo
- 中国国际生态城市论坛
- Formation: 2010; 16 years ago
- Type: Forum and Expo
- Headquarters: Binhai, Tianjin
- Website: www.binhaiforum.org/EN/

China International Eco-City Forum (Chinese: 中国国际生态城市论坛) is an annual international exhibition, first held in 2010. The permanent topic of the forum is "Eco-city will create a harmonious future."
