= Zhongtang =

Zhongtang could refer to the following places in China:

- Zhongtang Township (中塘乡), a township in Qianjiang District, Chongqing
- Zhongtang, Guangdong (中堂镇), a town in Dongguan, Guangdong
- Zhongtang, Tianjin (中塘镇), a town in Binhai New Area, Tianjin
