= Panzhuang =

Pānzhuāng (潘庄镇) could refer to the following locations in China:

- Panzhuang, Lulong County, town in northeastern Hebei
- Panzhuang, Linqing, town in Linqing, Shandong
- Panzhuang, Ninghe County, town in Ninghe County, Tianjin
