= Hangu, Tianjin =

Former district of Tianjin, China

Hangu 汉沽区
- District of the People's Republic of China
- 1961–2009
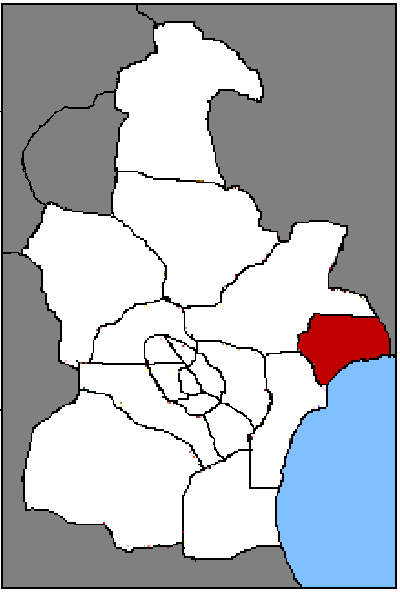
- Location of Hangu in Tianjin.
- History
  - Established: 1961
  - Disestablished: 2009
Succeeded by
Binhai
- Today part of: Part of the Binhai New Area, Tianjin

Hangu District (simplified Chinese: 汉沽区; traditional Chinese: 漢沽區; pinyin: Hàngū Qū), is a former district in eastern Tianjin, China; now part of Binhai New Area. It serves as a gateway towards Liaoning, Jilin and Heilongjiang provinces.

== Geography ==
Hangu District is 50 kilometers away from Tangshan in Hebei Province to the east, 60 km (37 mi) away from downtown in the west, 20 km (12 mi) away from Tianjin New Port and TEDA and 90 km (56 mi) away from Dagang District, notable for its petroleum production. Bohai Bay is located to the south and connects with Ninghe County in the north. The Jiyun River divides the north and south of the district for a length of 35 km (22 mi) and covers a watershed of 8.67 km^{2} (3.35 sq mi). It covers an area of 430 km^{2} (170 sq mi), including 13 km^{2} (5.0 sq mi) of city zones. Its current bottomland is 3.33 km^{2} (1.29 sq mi), while the surface area is 40 km^{2} (15 sq mi). The river vents 720 million m^{3} of water to the sea annually. The district has two reservoirs, the capacity of Yingcheng reservoir is 30 million m^{3}, while that of Gaozhuang reservoir is 4.5 million m^{3}.

=== Climate ===
Hangu District has a humid continental climate (Köppen climate classification Dwa). The average annual temperature in Hangu is 12.1 °C (53.8 °F). The average annual rainfall is 537.0 mm (21.14 in) with July as the wettest month. The temperatures are highest on average in July, at around 26.2 °C (79.2 °F), and lowest in January, at around −4.5 °C (23.9 °F).

Climate data for Hangu District, elevation −1 m (−3.3 ft), (1991–2020 normals, extremes 1981–present)
Month	Jan	Feb	Mar	Apr	May	Jun	Jul	Aug	Sep	Oct	Nov	Dec	Year
Record high °C (°F)	13.3 (55.9)	17.7 (63.9)	28.8 (83.8)	32.3 (90.1)	36.9 (98.4)	38.1 (100.6)	39.7 (103.5)	36.8 (98.2)	35.3 (95.5)	30.6 (87.1)	21.4 (70.5)	14.3 (57.7)	39.7 (103.5)
Mean daily maximum °C (°F)	1.5 (34.7)	4.9 (40.8)	11.6 (52.9)	19.4 (66.9)	25.5 (77.9)	28.7 (83.7)	30.5 (86.9)	30.0 (86.0)	26.2 (79.2)	19.2 (66.6)	10.2 (50.4)	3.2 (37.8)	17.6 (63.7)
Daily mean °C (°F)	−3.8 (25.2)	−0.5 (31.1)	6.2 (43.2)	13.9 (57.0)	20.1 (68.2)	24.1 (75.4)	26.6 (79.9)	25.9 (78.6)	21.3 (70.3)	13.8 (56.8)	5.2 (41.4)	−1.7 (28.9)	12.6 (54.7)
Mean daily minimum °C (°F)	−8.1 (17.4)	−4.9 (23.2)	1.6 (34.9)	8.9 (48.0)	15.1 (59.2)	20.0 (68.0)	23.2 (73.8)	22.3 (72.1)	16.9 (62.4)	9.2 (48.6)	1.1 (34.0)	−5.4 (22.3)	8.3 (47.0)
Record low °C (°F)	−22.5 (−8.5)	−19.1 (−2.4)	−11.9 (10.6)	−2.5 (27.5)	5.2 (41.4)	9.6 (49.3)	16.1 (61.0)	14.4 (57.9)	5.8 (42.4)	−4.4 (24.1)	−10.0 (14.0)	−17.7 (0.1)	−22.5 (−8.5)
Average precipitation mm (inches)	2.8 (0.11)	5.8 (0.23)	6.5 (0.26)	20.8 (0.82)	37.2 (1.46)	73.7 (2.90)	155.1 (6.11)	116.3 (4.58)	48.7 (1.92)	35.4 (1.39)	12.7 (0.50)	3.5 (0.14)	518.5 (20.42)
Average precipitation days (≥ 0.1 mm)	1.5	2.2	2.7	4.7	6.1	8.6	11.0	9.8	6.1	4.9	3.1	2.1	62.8
Average snowy days	2.7	2.4	0.9	0.1	0	0	0	0	0	0.1	1.6	2.7	10.5
Average relative humidity (%)	58	58	54	54	59	69	78	78	72	67	64	61	64
Mean monthly sunshine hours	192.3	191.8	244.9	255.0	277.9	238.7	203.7	217.5	222.2	210.9	179.5	178.7	2,613.1
Percentage possible sunshine	63	63	66	64	63	54	45	52	60	62	60	61	59
Source: China Meteorological Administrationall-time August high

== Economy ==
Hangu has a dualistic economic structure of a large city and small country. The northwest of the district is the agricultural area, while its southeast is the industrial area as well as ocean fishery area. The city zone is centrally located, on both sides of Jiyun River.

== Industry ==
Hangu District has a stable foundation in its industries. Much of the districts industry is based in the Binhai area. Marine chemical production forms the largest part of the areas industry, followed by other synthetic production industries. Its industrial output amounts to 80% of the national income. There are 13 kinds of primary industries like salt, chemical, textile, clothing, mechanism, metallurgy processing, paper making, home appliances, furniture, electronics, architectural materials, foods and shoemaking. The Changlu Hangu saltfield is one of the four saltfields of the famous Changlu salt area, which has a strong capacity in crude salt production. It also produces a series of high-quality products in the fields of fine salt and chemical, most of which are exported. Agriculture and fisheries make up the rest of Hangu's economy. Rice, fruits, aquatic products are the prominent features of the agricultural products in Hangu. The area's grapes contain high amounts of sugar and are used for wine production.

== Marine Industry ==
The district boasts plentiful marine chemical resources. The area's coast line spans 32 kilometers, contains 27 species of seawater and freshwater fish and its history of salt processing dates back over 1000 years. Hangu's salt ponds cover an area of 139.33 km^{2} (53.80 sq mi), about three times the size of the plantation area in the whole district. Its 'Changlu salt' is world-renowned and is white in color and large in size. It has owned the reputation of "Jade in Lutai" from the old. As the average content of sodium chloride is 96.8%, it is a perfect raw material for use in marine chemicals.

== Power supply ==
Much of the areas electric power is generated from Solar energy, while there is also widespread use of oil resources and geothermal power, which has been heavily exploited. Other methods of power supply are being considered for future development, such as wave power and wind power.

== Land usage ==
There are two parts of uncultivated land in Hangu, the total area of which is 38 km^{2} (15 sq mi). One is in the southeast part containing the Jiyun river and is near the coast to the east and has the Tanggu highway and Beijing - Shanhaiguan railway. Meanwhile, this land has Yingcheng reservoir and processing establishments for industrial sewage in the south and public city infrastructures in the north. The northeastern part of Hangu is also undeveloped with Hannan railway running through it.

== Transport ==
The area is linked to the Jingshan and Beijing-Shanhaiguan railways. The Hannan line also leads to the Nanbao saltfield in Hebei Province and the regional industrial shuttle line have been established in Hangu. Four railway stations serve the district with an annual output exceeding 5 million tons. Hangu is well connected to China's road network with 7 routes leading towards the area, including the Lu-Han, Tang-Han, Jin-Han, Han-Yu, Hannan, Hanbei and Lutang roads which connect Hangu with TEDA, Tianjin New Port, Beijing, Tangshan and northeast China.
