= Tianjin Joyful Sea Magic Cube =

Theme park in Tianjin, China

Tianjin Joyful Sea Magic Cube (Chinese: 天津欢乐水魔方), located in Tianjin Binhai New Area's Tourism District near Central Avenue, opened in June 2013 after being planned and designed by DPI. The park has six themed zones and 19 water rides.

== Background ==
The park announced on August 28, 2021, that it would close on August 30, with plans to return in 2022. However, an announcement of its reopening was made in the first half of 2023. Unfortunately, after that year, the park declared bankruptcy and was repeatedly placed for foreclosure with no bidders. After multiple unsuccessful sales, the park was abandoned in 2024.
