= Dagang, Tianjin =

Former district of Tianjin, China

Coordinates: 38.7276°N 117.436°E

Dagang 大港区
- District of the People's Republic of China
- 1979–2009
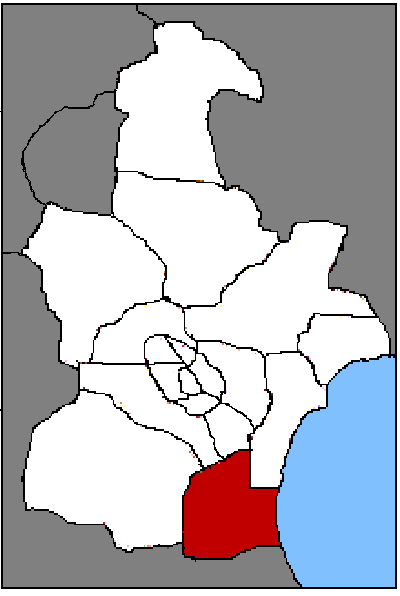
- Location of Dagang in Tianjin
- History
  - Established: 1979
  - Disestablished: 2009
Preceded by	Succeeded by
Jinnan District	Binhai
- Today part of: Part of the Binhai New Area, Tianjin

Dagang District (Chinese: 大港区; pinyin: Dàgǎng Qū; lit. 'Great Port District') was a former district of Tianjin, located at the city's southeast. It had a population of 440,000 and occupied 1,113.83 km^{2} (430.05 sq mi) in size, with a coast line stretching approximately 25 km (16 mi) on the eastern side.

Established in 1979, Dagang has developed a foundation of petroleum chemistry and hosts Dagang Oilfield within its border. In November 2009 Binhai New Area was consolidated into a district, and the former subordinate districts of Tanggu, Hangu and Dagang were abolished.

== Climate ==
Climate data for Dagang District, elevation 2 m (6.6 ft), (1991–2020 normals, extremes 1981–present)
Month	Jan	Feb	Mar	Apr	May	Jun	Jul	Aug	Sep	Oct	Nov	Dec	Year
Record high °C (°F)	13.2 (55.8)	19.9 (67.8)	28.5 (83.3)	32.9 (91.2)	37.6 (99.7)	41.8 (107.2)	41.2 (106.2)	38.1 (100.6)	35.6 (96.1)	30.8 (87.4)	21.4 (70.5)	14.9 (58.8)	41.8 (107.2)
Mean daily maximum °C (°F)	1.9 (35.4)	5.4 (41.7)	12.2 (54.0)	20.1 (68.2)	26.1 (79.0)	29.4 (84.9)	31.0 (87.8)	30.2 (86.4)	26.5 (79.7)	19.6 (67.3)	10.7 (51.3)	3.7 (38.7)	18.1 (64.5)
Daily mean °C (°F)	−2.7 (27.1)	0.5 (32.9)	6.9 (44.4)	14.4 (57.9)	20.6 (69.1)	24.8 (76.6)	27.2 (81.0)	26.5 (79.7)	21.9 (71.4)	14.6 (58.3)	6.1 (43.0)	−0.6 (30.9)	13.4 (56.0)
Mean daily minimum °C (°F)	−6.3 (20.7)	−3.4 (25.9)	2.6 (36.7)	9.6 (49.3)	15.7 (60.3)	20.6 (69.1)	23.8 (74.8)	23.0 (73.4)	17.7 (63.9)	10.3 (50.5)	2.2 (36.0)	−4.1 (24.6)	9.3 (48.8)
Record low °C (°F)	−19.4 (−2.9)	−18.4 (−1.1)	−8.5 (16.7)	−0.7 (30.7)	6.8 (44.2)	10.7 (51.3)	17.3 (63.1)	14.8 (58.6)	6.4 (43.5)	−4.4 (24.1)	−10.9 (12.4)	−19.3 (−2.7)	−19.4 (−2.9)
Average precipitation mm (inches)	2.4 (0.09)	5.9 (0.23)	6.6 (0.26)	21.3 (0.84)	39.1 (1.54)	69.5 (2.74)	171.0 (6.73)	125.5 (4.94)	48.2 (1.90)	32.0 (1.26)	14.0 (0.55)	2.8 (0.11)	538.3 (21.19)
Average precipitation days (≥ 0.1 mm)	1.7	2.3	2.5	4.6	6.1	8.3	11.1	9.4	6.3	5.0	3.3	1.8	62.4
Average snowy days	2.7	2.6	0.9	0.1	0	0	0	0	0	0	1.1	2.7	10.1
Average relative humidity (%)	56	55	51	52	55	65	74	75	68	62	61	57	61
Mean monthly sunshine hours	178.8	181.6	231.8	243.5	271.4	233.8	203.3	209.3	211.5	200.2	166.7	165.7	2,497.6
Percentage possible sunshine	59	59	62	61	61	53	45	50	57	59	56	57	57
Source: China Meteorological Administrationall-time extreme temperatureall-time August high
