= Tianjin Binhai Library =

Library in Tianjin, China

Coordinates: 39.0121°N 117.6914°E

Tianjin Binhai New Area Library
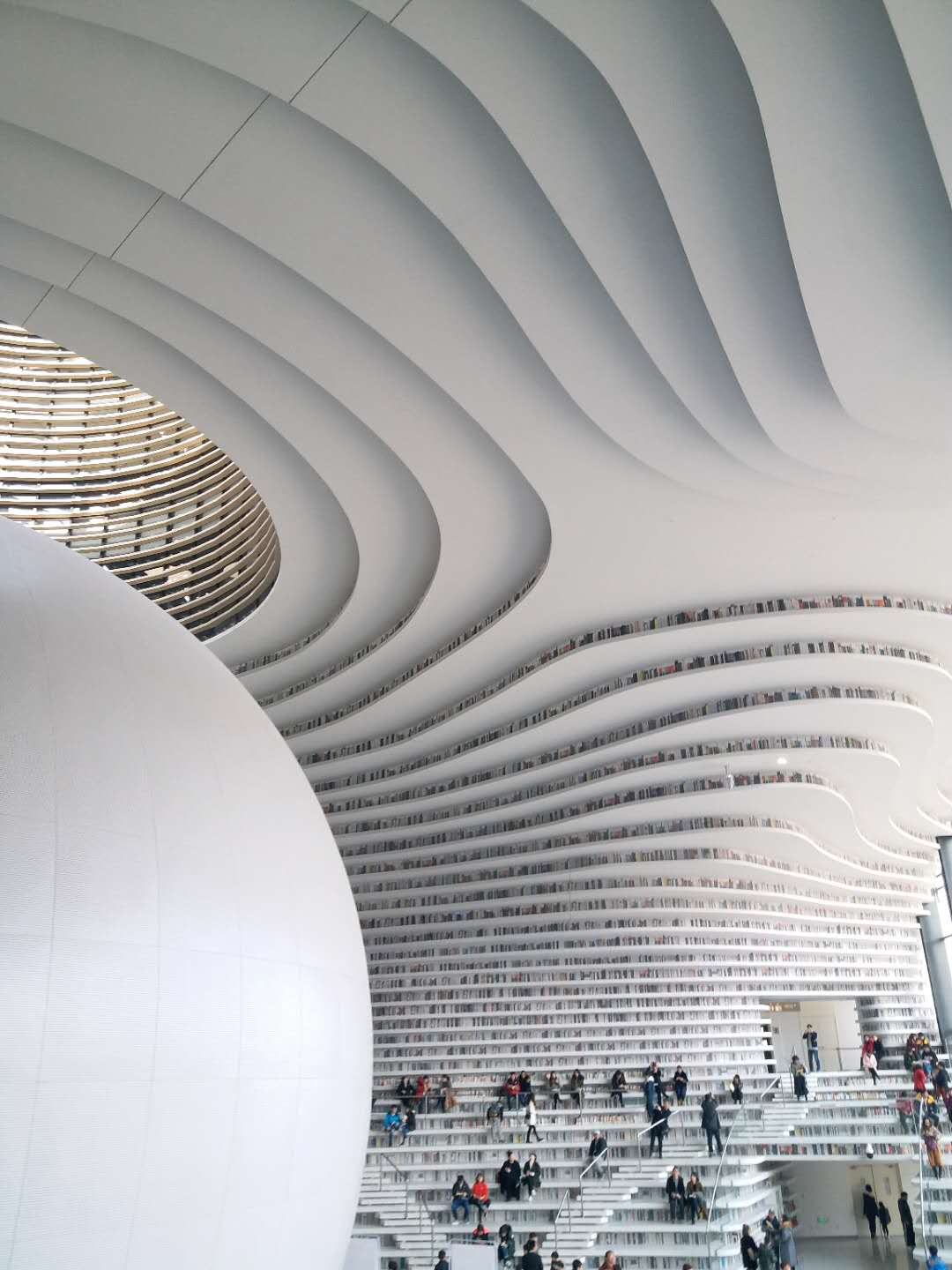
- Floor to ceiling bookshelves shaped as an eye.
- Location: District of Binhai in the Municipality of Tianjin, China
- Established: 2017
- Branches: 1

Collection
- Size: 1.2 million books

Tianjin Binhai New Area Library (Chinese: 天津滨海新区图书馆), nicknamed "The Eye", is a library in Tianjin, China. It is part of the Binhai Cultural Center, being one of its five central attractions.

== Architecture and description ==
The five-level library has a total space of 33,700 square meters (363,000 sq ft). It features floor-to-ceiling, terraced bookshelves able to hold 1.2 million books, and a large, luminous sphere in the center that serves as an auditorium with a capacity of 110 people. The library is nicknamed 'The Evil Eye' because the sphere, which appears like an iris, can be seen from the park outside through an eye-shaped opening.

In the first week after opening day, approximately 10,000 people a day came, causing queues outside.

The first and second floors contain mainly lounge areas and reading rooms. The floors above have computer rooms, meeting rooms, and offices. There are also two rooftop patios. Because of a decision to complete the library quickly and a conflict with what was officially approved, the main atrium cannot be used for book storage; the rooms providing access to the upper tiers of shelving were not built and book spines were printed onto the backs of the shelf space for the opening-day photographs.

== Construction ==
The library was designed by the Rotterdam-based architectural firm MVRDV along with the Tianjin Urban Planning and Design Institute (TUPDI), a group of local architects. Because of a tight construction schedule by the local government, the project went from preliminary drawings to its doors opening within three years. It opened in October 2017.

== See also ==
- National first-class library
