= G0112 Changchun–Liaoyuan Expressway =

Expressway in Tianjin and Hebei provinces of China

Changchun–Liaoyuan Expressway
- 长春－辽源高速公路
- Jinshi Expressway 长辽高速公路

Route information
- Auxiliary route of G1

Major junctions
- North end: Changchun
- South end: Liaoyuan

Location
- Country: China

Highway system
- National Trunk Highway System; Primary; Auxiliary; National Highways; Transport in China
← G0111	→ G0121

The Changchun–Liaoyuan Expressway (Chinese: 长春—辽源高速公路), designated as G0112 and commonly abbreviated as Changliao Expressway (Chinese: 长辽高速公路), is an expressway in northeastern China linking the cities of Changchun and Liaoyuan.

== Route ==
The expressway is a branch of G1 Jingha Expressway and is entirely located within Jilin Province. The expressway starts in Changchun before it passes through Yitong Manchu Autonomous County, with the end point located in Liaoyuan. The expressway opened to traffic on 26 September 2009.
