= Zhongbei =

Town of Tianjin, China

Zhongbei Town 中北镇
- Town
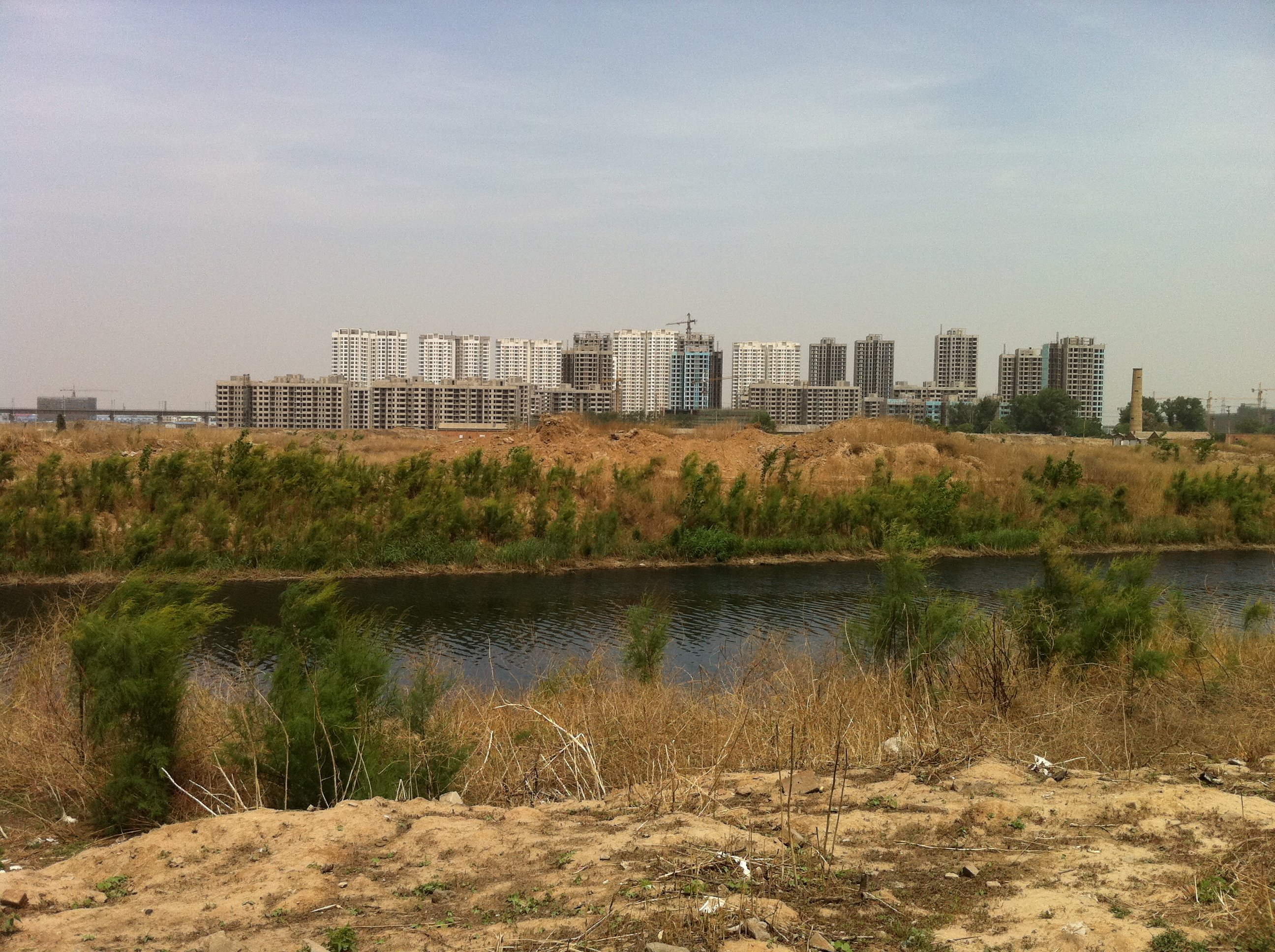
- Southern Waterway passing through Zhongbei Town, 2011

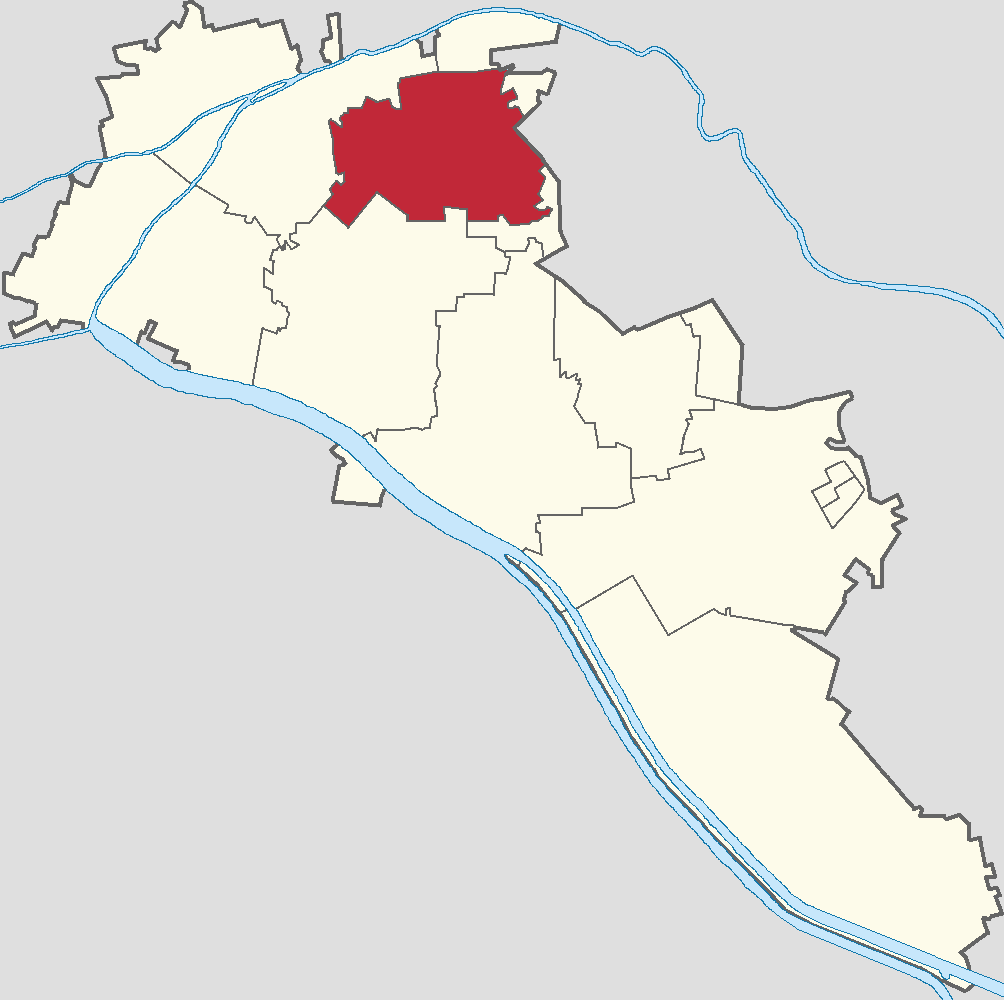
- Location in Xiqing District

- Location within Tianjin Location within China
- Coordinates: 39°07′53″N 117°04′47″E
- Country: China
- Municipality: Tianjin
- District: Xiqing
- Village-level Divisions: 31 communities 22 villages

Area
  - Total: 38.19 km^{2} (14.75 sq mi)
- Elevation: 7 m (23 ft)

Population (2010)
  - Total: 92,814
  - Density: 2,430/km^{2} (6,295/sq mi)
- Time zone: UTC+8 (CST)
- Postal code: 300380
- Area code: 022

Zhongbei Town (simplified Chinese: 中北镇; traditional Chinese: 中北鎮; pinyin: Zhōngběi Zhèn) is a town in Xiqing District, in the western suburbs of Tianjin, People's Republic of China. It borders Xiyingmen Subdistrict in its north, Xiangyanglu and Jialingdao Subdistricts in its east, Zhnagjiawo Town in its south, and Yangliuqing Town in its west. As of 2011, it had a total population of 92,814.

The name "Zhongbei" literally means "Middle North".

== Geography ==
Zhongbei Town is located south of Ziya River and is bisected by the Southern Waterway (Chinese: 南运河). The National Highway 205 passes through the north of the town.

== History ==
Timeline of Zhongbei's History
Years	Status	Within
1952 - 1953	Zhong Beixie Township	Tianjin County, Tianjin
1953 - 1955	Zhong Beixie Township	Jinxijiao District, Tianjin
1955 - 1958	Zhong Beixie Township	Xijiao District, Tianjin
1958 - 1961	Zhong Beixie Township	Nankai District, Tianjin
1961 - 1962	Zhong Beixie People's Commune	Nankai District, Tianjin
1962 - 1963	Zhong Beixie People's Commune	Xijiao District, Tianjin
1963 - 1964	Da Shaozhikou People's Commune; Zhong Beixie People's Commune; Lilou People's Commune	Xijiao District, Tianjin
1964 - 1968	Da Shaozhikou People's Commune; Lilou People's Commune	Xijiao District, Tianjin
1968 - 1969	Jiuyijiu People's Commune; Lilou People's Commune	Xijiao District, Tianjin
1969 - 1983	Jiuyijiu People's Commune	Xijiao District, Tianjin
1983 - 1984	Jiuyijiu Township	Xijiao District, Tianjin
1984 - 1992	Zhong Beixie Township	Xijiao District, Tianjin
1992 - 1997	Zhong Beixie Township	Xiqing District, Tianjin
1997–present	Zhongbei Town	Xiqing District, Tianjin

== Administrative divisions ==
At the end of 2022, Zhongbei Town consists of 53 subdivisions, including 31 residential communities and 22 villages. They are listed below:

Subdivision names	Name transliterations	Type
溪秀苑	Xixiu Yuan	Community
侯台	Houtai	Community
东姜井	Dong Jiangjing	Community
西姜井	Xi Jiangjing	Community
大地十二城	Dadi Shi'ercheng	Community
水语花城	Shuiyu Huacheng	Community
华亭佳园	Huating Jiayuan	Community
假日风景	Jiari Fengjing	Community
富力湾	Fuli Wan	Community
大地十二城枫桦园	Dadi Shi'ercheng Fenghua Yuan	Community
福雅花园	Fuya Huayuan	Community
福悦里	Fuyue Li	Community
旭水蓝轩	Xushui Lanxuan	Community
华亭丽园	Huating Liyuan	Community
假日润园	Jiari Runyuan	Community
中信珺台	Zhongxin Juntai	Community
碧水家园	Bishui Jiayuan	Community
溪秀苑第二	Xiwan Yuan Di'er	Community
云锦世家	Yunjin Shijia	Community
红杉花苑	Hongshan Huayuan	Community
澜湾花园	Lanwan Huayuan	Community
顺通家园	Shuntong Jiayuan	Community
锦曦花苑	Jinxi Huayuan	Community
旭辉御府	Xuhui Yufu	Community
燕宇花园	Yanyu Huayuan	Community
景园里	Jingyuan Li	Community
郦景园	Lijing Yuan	Community
大安翠庭园	Da'an Cuiting Yuan	Community
甜水	Tianshui	Community
新津国际	Xinjin Guoji	Community
万汇文化广场	Wanhui Wenhua Guangchang	Community
汪庄	Wangzhuang	Village
李家园	Li Jiayuan	Village
东姜井	Dong Jiangjing	Village
西姜井	Xi Jiangjing	Village
大稍直口	Da Shaozhikou	Village
邢庄	Xingzhuang	Village
曹庄子	Cao Zhuangzi	Village
大卞庄	Da Bianzhuang	Village
东北斜	Dong Beixie	Village
中北斜	Zhong Beixie	Village
西北斜	Xi Beixie	Village
雷庄子	Lei Zhuangzi	Village
四新庄村	Sixinzhuang Cun	Village
小蒋庄	Xiao Jiangzhuang	Village
大蒋庄	Da Jiangzhuang	Village
祁庄	Qizhuang	Village
李楼	Lilou	Village
谢庄	Xiezhuang	Village
东马庄	Dong Mazhuang	Village
西马庄	Xi Mazhuang	Village
王庄	Wangzhuang	Village
大梁庄	Da Liangzhuang	Village

== Galleries ==
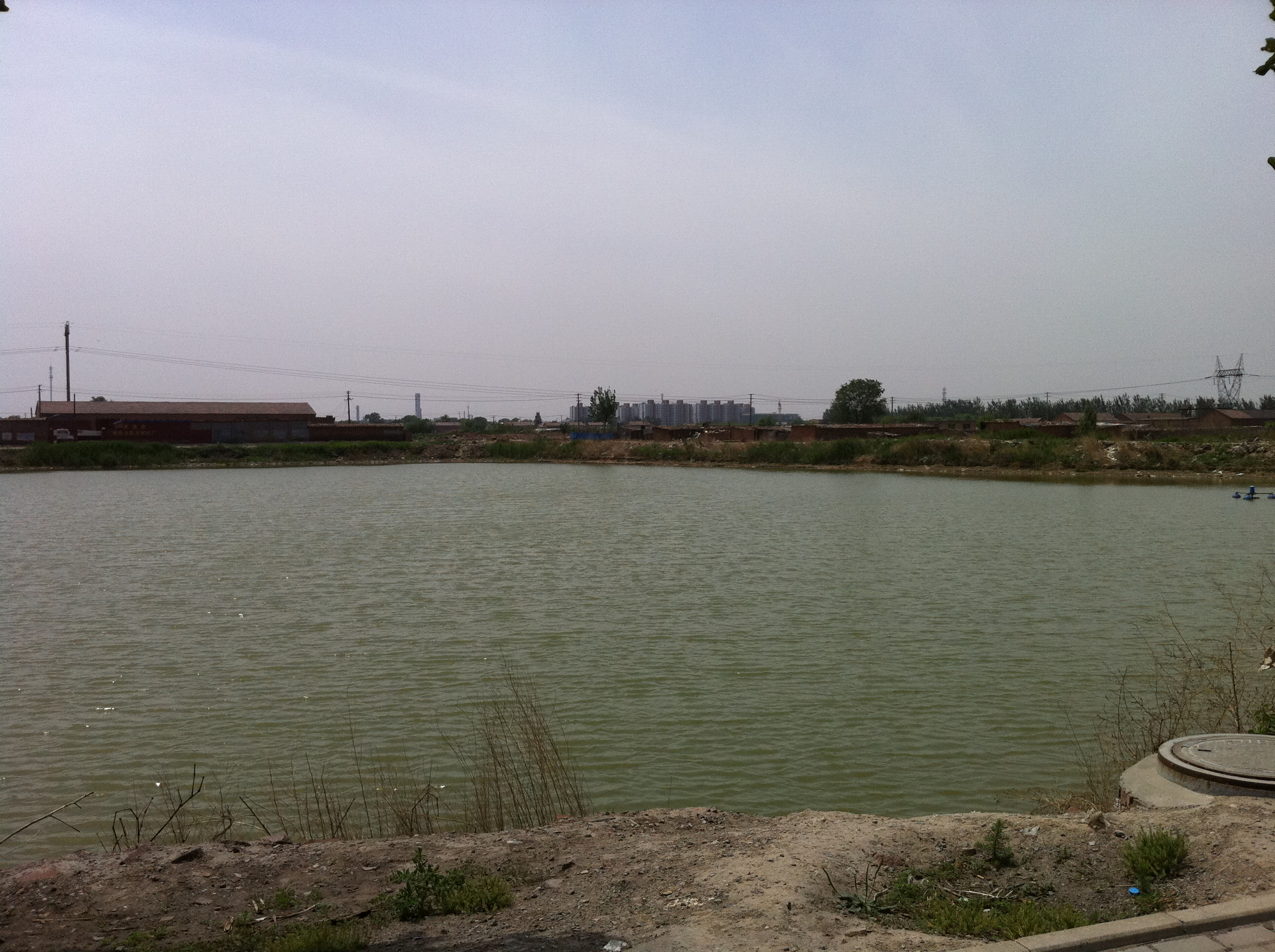
View of the Southern Waterway, 2011

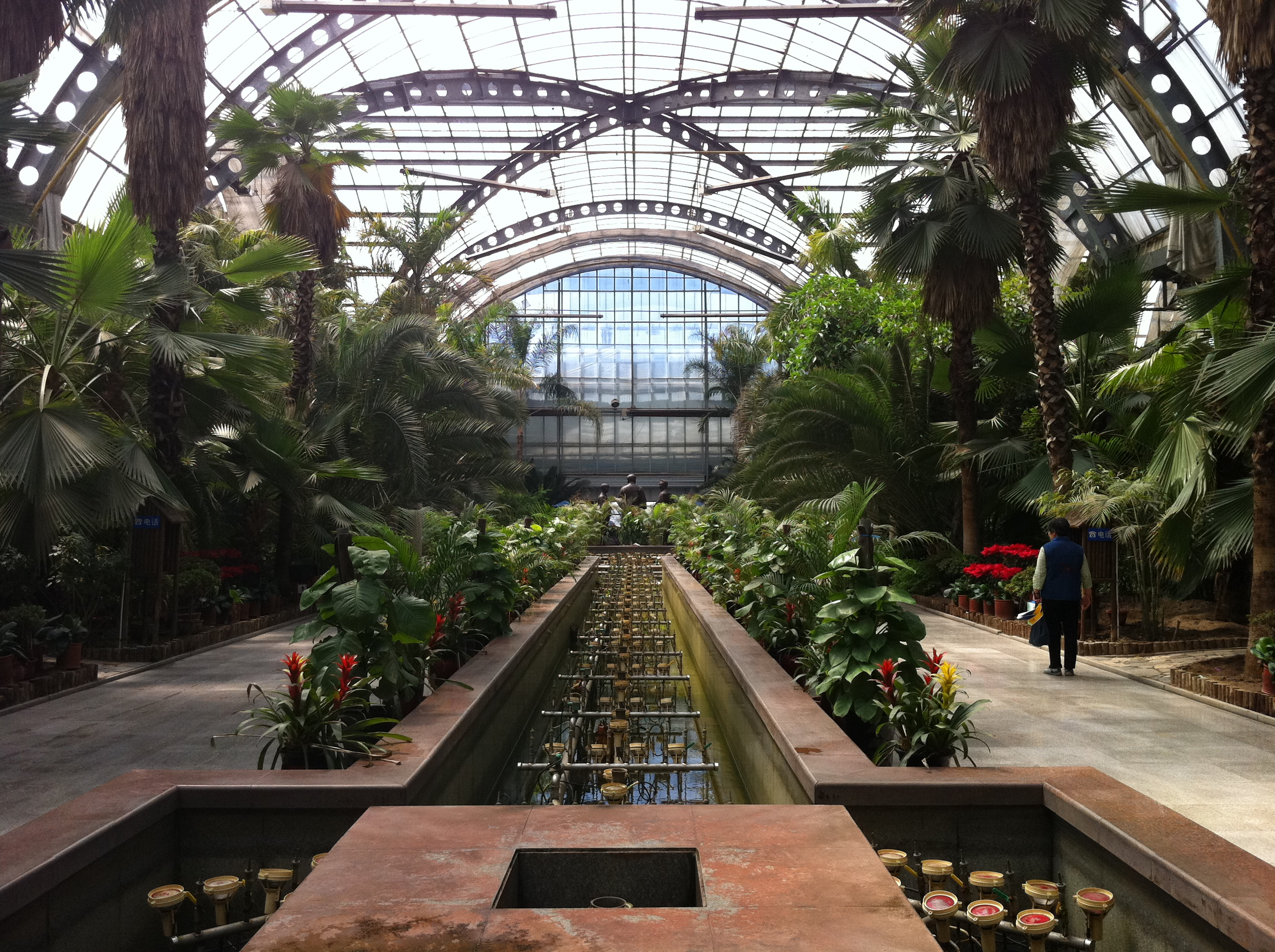
Interior of Tianjin Botanical Garden in the east of the town, 2011

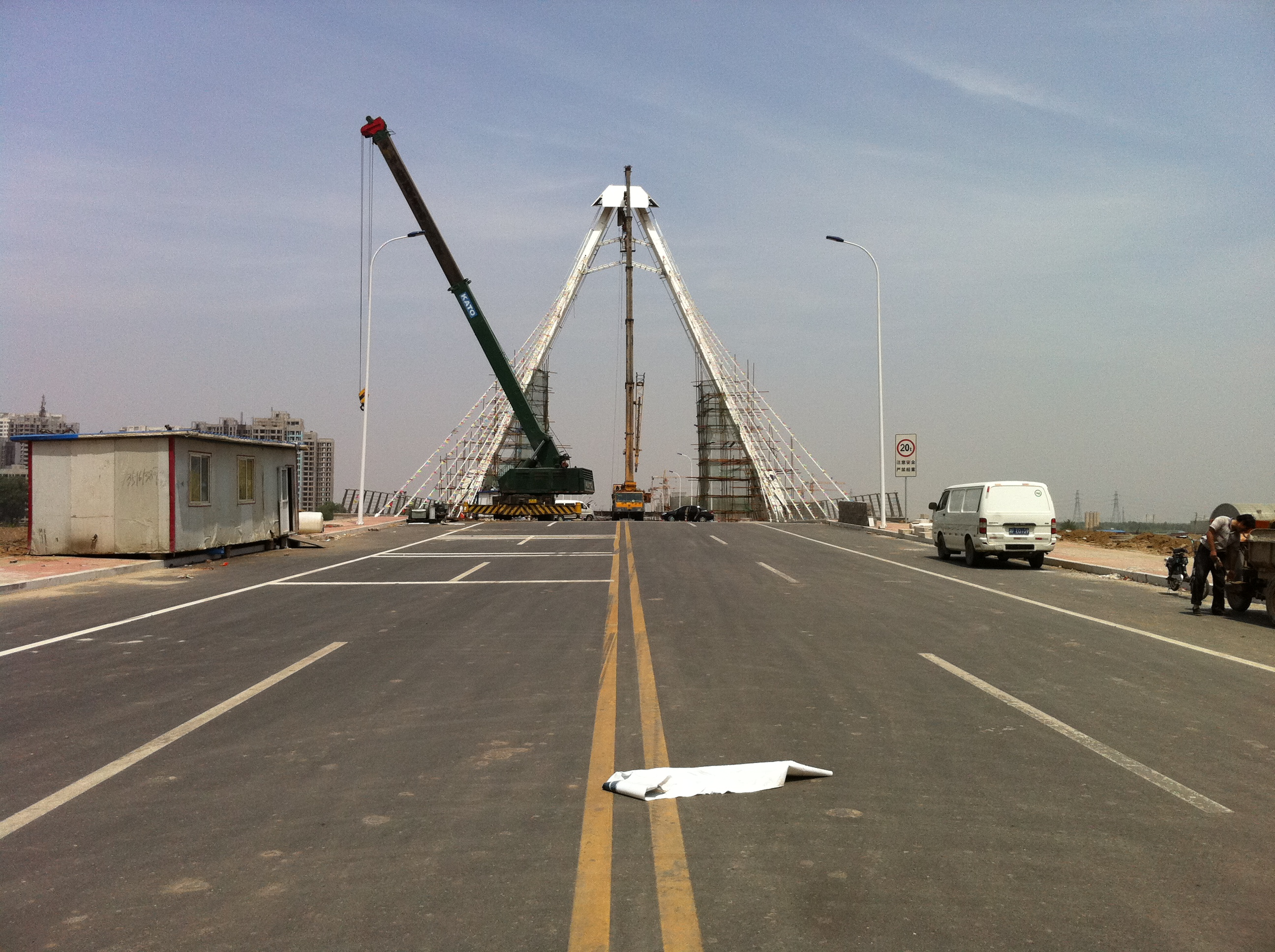
Section of Wanhua Road near the Southern Waterway, 2011

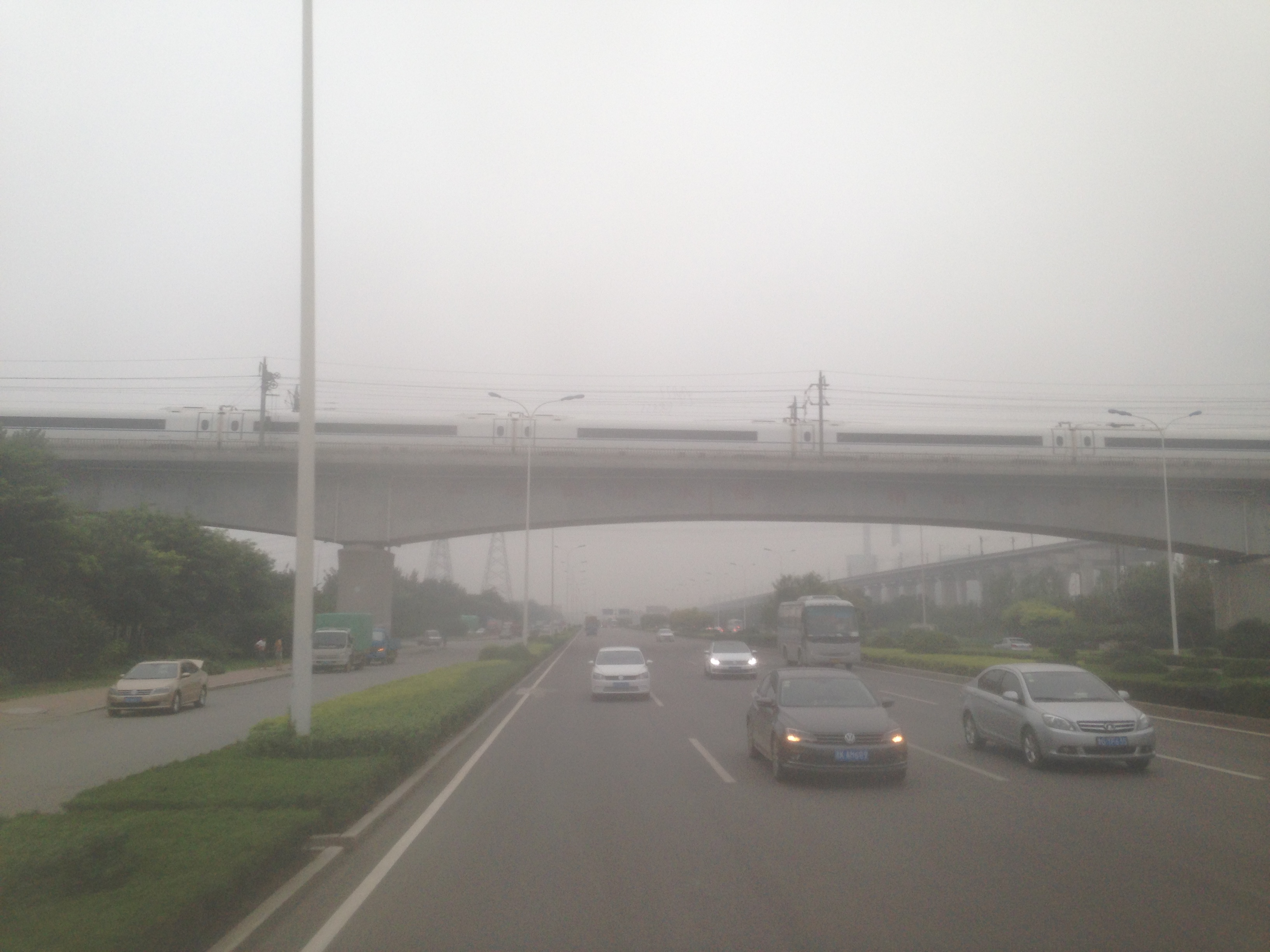
Xiqing Avenue near the border with Yangliuqing, 2016

== See also ==
- List of township-level divisions of Tianjin
