= Xincheng, Tianjin =

Xincheng 新城镇
- Town
- Location in Tianjin
- Coordinates: 38°59′18″N 117°36′48″E
- Country: People's Republic of China
- Direct-administered municipality: Tianjin
- District: Binhai
- Time zone: UTC+8 (China Standard)

Xincheng (Chinese: 新城; pinyin: Xīnchéng) is a town in Binhai New Area of Tianjin, China.
