= Yangliuqing =

Yangliuqing Town 杨柳青镇
- Town
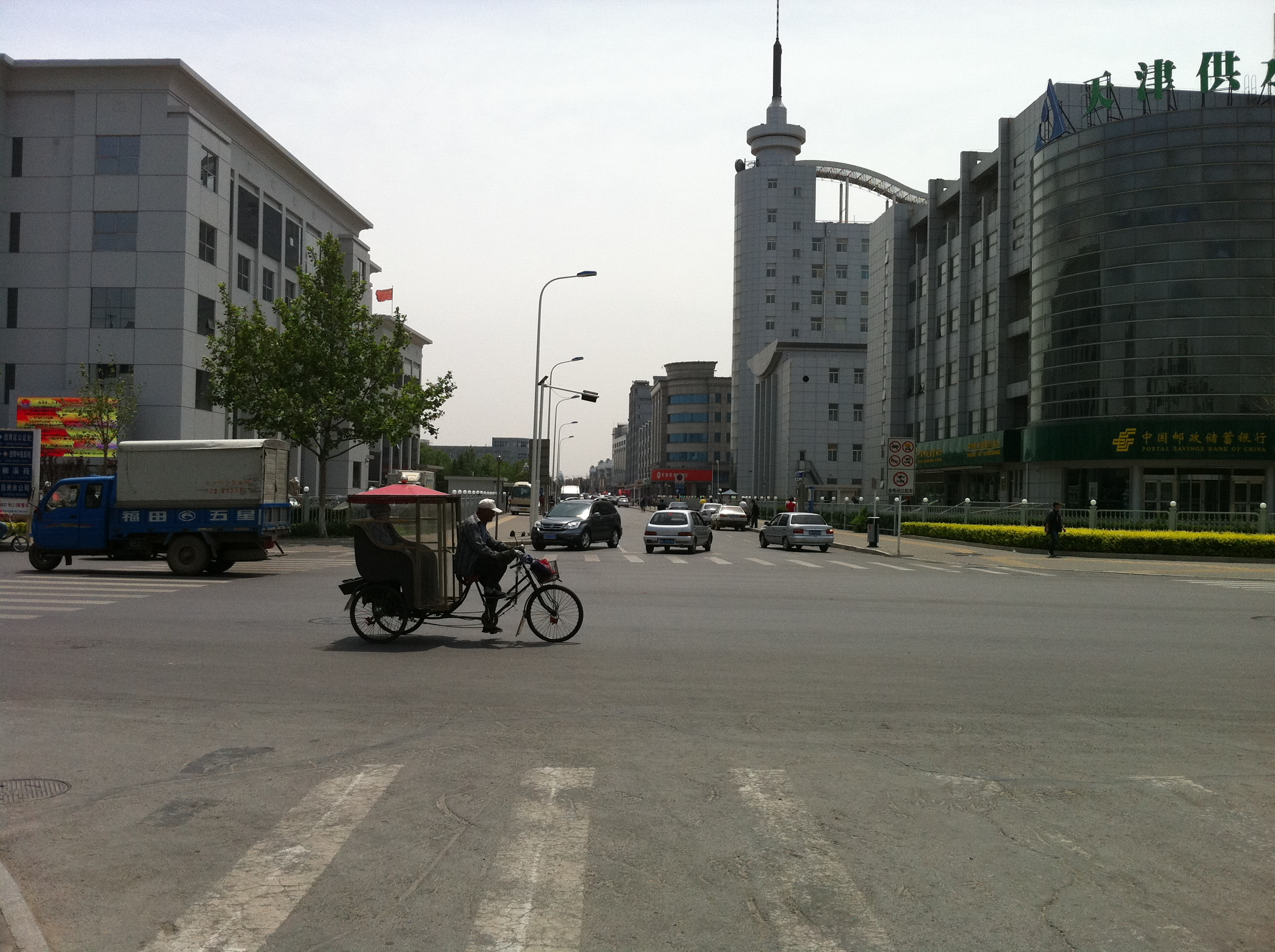
- Xiqing Road within Yangliuqing, 2011

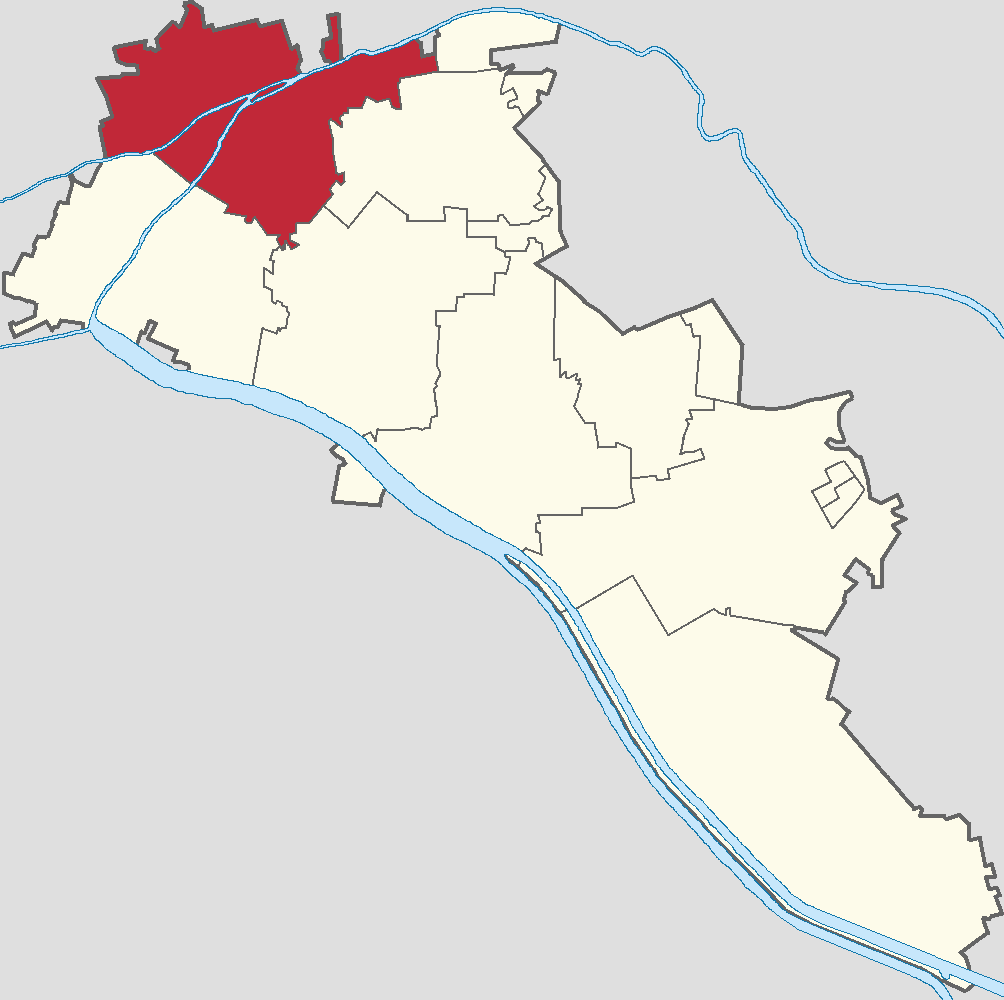
- Location in Xiqing District

- Location in Tianjin
- Coordinates: 39°07′48″N 117°00′51″E
- Country: China
- Municipality: Tianjin
- District: Xiqing District
- Village-level divisions: 20 residential communities 25 villages

Area
  - Total: 65.61 km^{2} (25.33 sq mi)
- Elevation: 5 m (16 ft)

Population (2010)
  - Total: 118,291
  - Density: 1,803/km^{2} (4,670/sq mi)
- Time zone: UTC+8 (China Standard)
- Postal code: 120111
- Area code: 022

Yangliuqing Town (simplified Chinese: 杨柳青镇; traditional Chinese: 楊柳青鎮; pinyin: Yángliǔqīng Zhèn) is a market town in Xiqing District, in the western suburbs of Tianjin, People's Republic of China. Despite its relatively small size, it has been named since 2006 in the "famous historical and cultural market towns in China".

It is best known in China for creating nianhua or Yangliuqing nianhua. For more than 400 years, Yangliuqing has in effect specialised in the creation of these woodcuts for the New Year. Wood block prints using vivid colour schemes to portray traditional scenes of children's games often interwoven with auspiciouse objects.

As of 2010, it had a total population of 118,291.

== Geography ==
Yangliuqing Town is located at the northwestern corner of Xiqing District. It borders Shangkou and Qingguang Towns in the north, Xiyingmen Subdistrict and Zhongbei Town in the east, Zhangjiawo and Xinkou Towns in the south, and Wangqingtuo Town in the west. Ziya and Zhongqing Rivers flows through the middle of the town. National Highway 112 and 104 both passes through the town.

== Culture ==
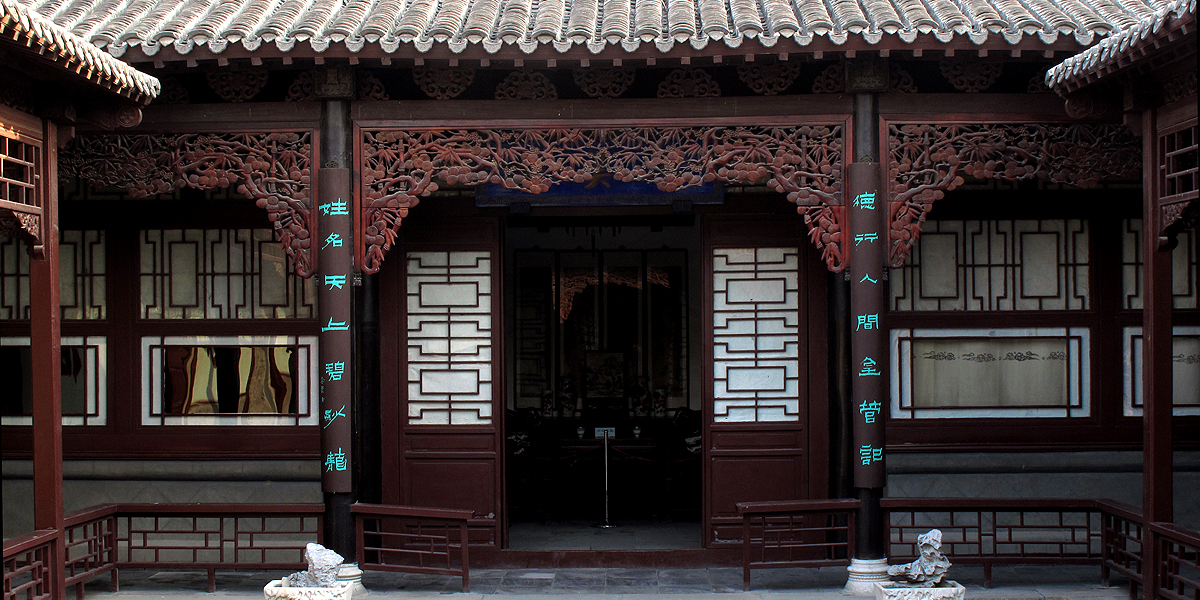
Shi Family Grand Courtyard

Yangliuqing is famous for its woodblock production of nianhua and depictions of gods and legendary figures. Wood block prints using vivid colour schemes to portray traditional scenes of children's games often interwoven with auspiciouse objects.

Shi Family Grand Courtyard (Chinese: 天津石家大院; pinyin: Tiānjīn Shíjiā Dàyuàn) is a folk custom museum and the former residence of wealthy merchant Shi Yuanshi. It was first constructed in 1875, and following an expansion in 2003, the courtyard received the title of "First Mansion in Northern China" with an area of 10,000 square kilometers. The courtyard currently hosts folk art pieces such as Yangliuqing New Year Pictures and brick sculptures.

== History ==
Timetable of Yangliuqing Town
Time	Status	Under
Jin dynasty	Liukou Town	
Yuan dynasty	Yangliuqing Town	Jinghai County, Qing Prefecture
Ming dynasty	Yangliuqing Town	Jinghai County, Hejian Prefecture
Qing dynasty	Yangqing Station	Tianjin County, Tianjin Prefecture
1912 - 1949	Yangliuqing Town	Tianjin
1949 - 1951	Yangliuqing Town	Hebei
1951 - 1954	Yangliuqing Town	Tianjin County, Hebei
1954 - 1958	Yangliuqing Town	Jinghai County, Hebei
1958 - 1960	Yangliuqing People's Commune	Jinghai County, Hebei
1960 - 1962	Yangliuqing People's Commune	Nankai District, Tianjin
1962 - 1987	Yangliuqing People's Commune	Xijiao District, Tianjin
1987 - 1992	Yangliuqing Town	Xijiao District, Tianjin
1992–present	Yangliuqing Town	Xiqing District, Tianjin

As of 2010, it had a total population of 118,291.

== Administrative divisions ==
In the year 2022, Yangqiuling has a total of 45 subdivisions, including 20 residential communities and 25 villages. They are listed in the table below:

Subdivision names	Name transliterations	Type
宁福苑	Ningfu Yuan	Community
柳苑里	Liuyuan Li	Community
轻机厂	Qingji Chang	Community
三经路	Sanjing Lu	Community
西河闸	Xi Hezha	Community
碧泉花园	Biquan Huayuan	Community
广汇园	Guanghui Yuan	Community
青水家园	Qingshui Jiayuan	Community
锦秀花园	Jinxiu Jiayuan	Community
世纪新苑	Shiji Xinyuan	Community
柳溪苑	Liuxi Yuan	Community
英伦名苑	Yinglun Mingyuan	Community
莱茵小镇	Laiyin Xiaozhen	Community
柳轩苑	Liuxuan Yuan	Community
美庭苑	Meiting Yuan	Community
御河墅	Yuhe Shu	Community
明月花苑	Mingyue Huayuan	Community
天津农学院	Tianjin Nongxueyuan	Community
天津理工中环信息学院	Tianjin Ligong Zhonghuan Xinxi Xueyuan	Community
天津劳动经济技术学校	Tianjin Laodong Jingji Jishu Xueyuan	Community
一街	Yi Jie	Village
二街	Er Jie	Village
三街	San Jie	Village
四街	Si Jie	Village
五街	Wu Jie	Village
六街	Liu Jie	Village
七街	Qi Jie	Village
八街	Ba Jie	Village
九街	Jiu Jie	Village
十街	Shi Jie	Village
十一街	Shiyi Jie	Village
十二街	Shi'er Jie	Village
十三街	Shisan Jie	Village
十四街	Shisi Jie	Village
十五街	Shiwu Jie	Village
十六街	Shiliu Jie	Village
白滩寺	Baitang Si	Village
大柳滩	Daliu Tan	Village
隐贤村	Yingxian Cun	Village
东桑园	Dong Sangyuan	Village
前桑园	Qian Sangyuan	Village
后桑园	Hou Sangyuan	Village
东碾坨嘴	Dong Niantuozui	Village
西碾坨嘴	Xi Niantuozui	Village
娄家院	Loujia Yuan	Village

== See also ==
- List of township-level divisions of Tianjin
