= Zhongtang, Tianjin =

Zhongtang 中塘镇
- Town
- Location in Tianjin
- Coordinates: 38.8669°N 117.3858°E
- Country: People's Republic of China
- Direct-administered municipality: Tianjin
- District: Binhai
- Time zone: UTC+8 (China Standard)

Zhongtang (Chinese: 中塘; pinyin: Zhōngtáng) is a town under the administration of Binhai, Tianjin, China. As of 2018, it has 24 villages and one industrial park under its administration.
