= Lutai =

Lutai 芦台镇
- Town
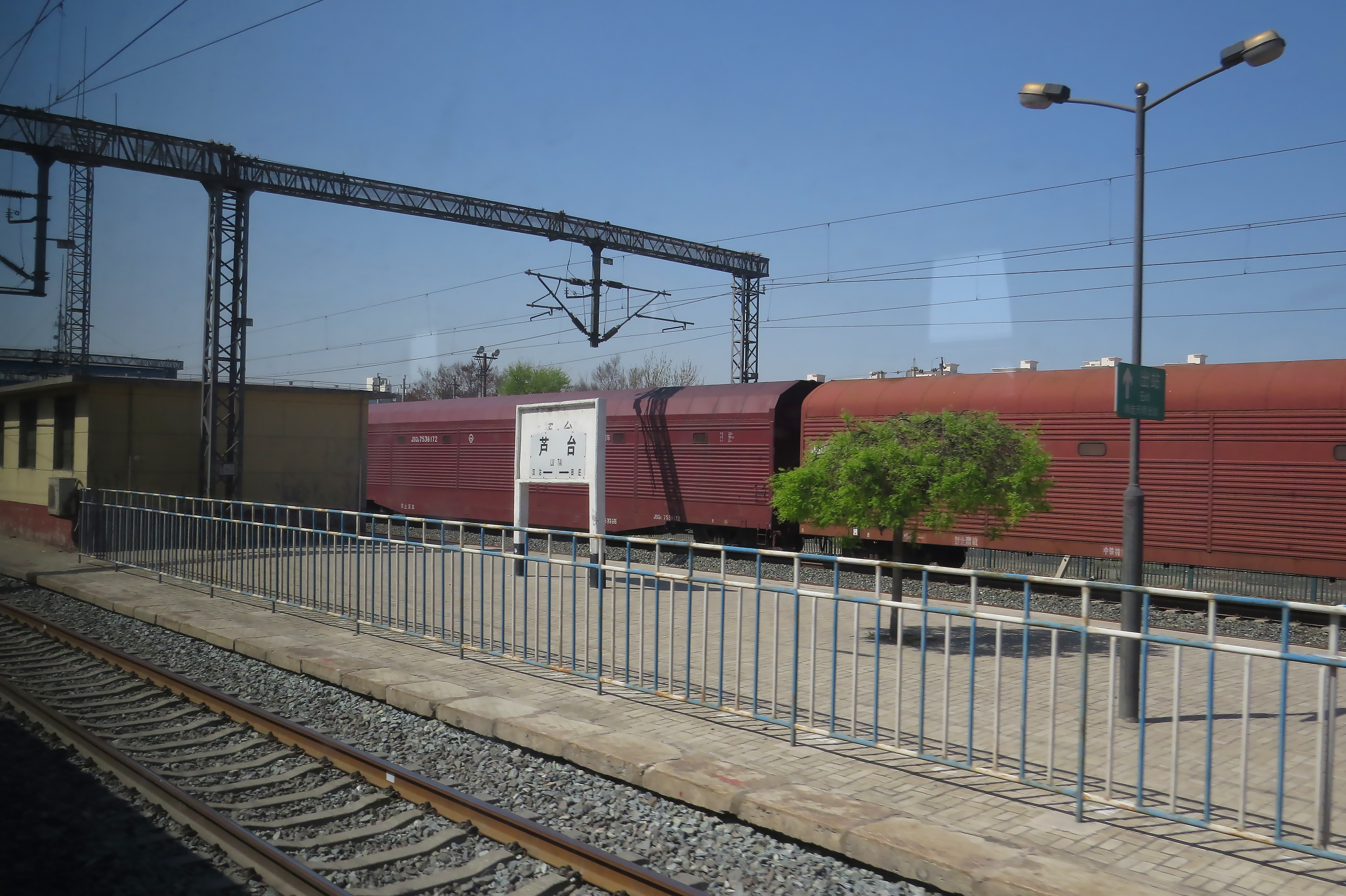
- Lutai railway station

- Location in Tianjin
- Coordinates: 39°19′41″N 117°49′23″E
- Country: People's Republic of China
- Municipality: Tianjin
- District: Ninghe
- Village-level divisions: 28 residential communities 37 villages
- Elevation: 3 m (9.8 ft)
- Time zone: UTC+8 (China Standard)
- Postal code: 301500
- Area code: 0022

Lutai (simplified Chinese: 芦台; traditional Chinese: 蘆台; pinyin: Lútái; lit. 'Reed Terrace') is a town in and the seat of Ninghe District, in the northeast of Tianjin, People's Republic of China. In the late 19th and early 20th centuries, it was the terminus for the Lutai Canal and the first extension of the Kaiping Tramway. By road, it is 65 kilometres (40 mi) from Tianjin Binhai International Airport, 85 km (53 mi) from downtown Tianjin, and 180 km (110 mi) from downtown Beijing. As of 2011, it had 28 residential communities (社区) and 37 villages under its administration.

== See also ==
- List of township-level divisions of Tianjin
