= Tanggu, Tianjin =

Former district of Tianjin, China

Coordinates: 38°59′50.60″N 117°40′28.20″E

Tanggu 塘沽区
- District of the People's Republic of China
- 1927–2009
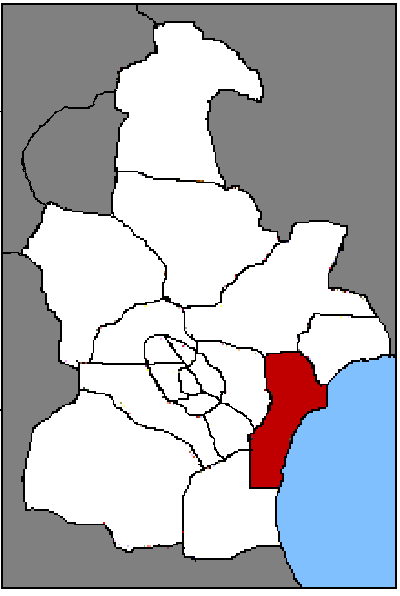
- Location of Tanggu in Tianjin
- History
  - Established: 1927
  - Disestablished: 2009
Succeeded by
Binhai
- Today part of: Part of the Binhai New Area, Tianjin

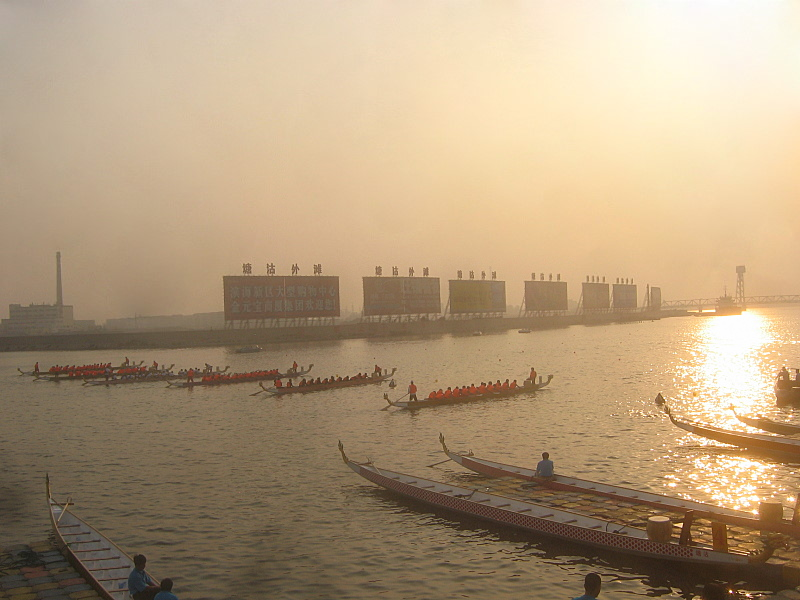
A dragonboat race in Tanggu.

Tanggu District (Chinese: 塘沽区; pinyin: Tánggū Qū) was a district in the Tianjin municipality, now part of the Binhai New Area. It is on the Hai River where it enters the Bohai Sea, and is a port for Tianjin, which is about 48 km (30 mi) upriver. The Tianjin Economic-Technological Development Area is within the city limits and oversees the construction of a bridge.

The Tanggu Truce was signed in Tanggu.

== Administrative divisions ==
- Subdistricts
  - Xincun (Note: s 新村, p Xīncūn.)
  - Jiefanglu (Note: s 解放路, p Jiěfànglù.)
  - Sanhuailu (Note: s 三槐路, p Sānhuáilù.)
  - Xingang (Note: s 新港, p Xīngǎng.)
  - Hangzhoudao (Note: s 杭州道, p Hángzhōudào.)
  - Xinhe (Note: s 新河, p Xīnhé.)
  - Xiangyang (Note: s 向阳, p Xiàngyáng.)
  - Dagu (Note: s 大沽, p Dàgū.)
  - Beitang
  - Hujiayuan (Note: s 胡家园, p Hújiāyuán.)
- Town:
  - Xincheng

== Climate ==
Climate data for Tanggu District, elevation 5 m (16 ft), (1991–2020 normals, extremes 1981–present)
Month	Jan	Feb	Mar	Apr	May	Jun	Jul	Aug	Sep	Oct	Nov	Dec	Year
Record high °C (°F)	12.9 (55.2)	17.1 (62.8)	28.8 (83.8)	33.1 (91.6)	37.7 (99.9)	38.5 (101.3)	40.9 (105.6)	37.4 (99.3)	35.4 (95.7)	31.0 (87.8)	21.7 (71.1)	14.0 (57.2)	40.9 (105.6)
Mean daily maximum °C (°F)	1.5 (34.7)	4.9 (40.8)	11.7 (53.1)	19.5 (67.1)	25.6 (78.1)	28.9 (84.0)	30.7 (87.3)	30.1 (86.2)	26.3 (79.3)	19.4 (66.9)	10.4 (50.7)	3.4 (38.1)	17.7 (63.9)
Daily mean °C (°F)	−2.4 (27.7)	0.6 (33.1)	6.8 (44.2)	14.2 (57.6)	20.6 (69.1)	24.6 (76.3)	27.2 (81.0)	26.6 (79.9)	22.3 (72.1)	15.1 (59.2)	6.4 (43.5)	−0.4 (31.3)	13.5 (56.3)
Mean daily minimum °C (°F)	−5.8 (21.6)	−3.0 (26.6)	2.9 (37.2)	9.9 (49.8)	16.3 (61.3)	21.0 (69.8)	24.1 (75.4)	23.5 (74.3)	18.6 (65.5)	11.2 (52.2)	2.9 (37.2)	−3.5 (25.7)	9.8 (49.7)
Record low °C (°F)	−18.4 (−1.1)	−14.0 (6.8)	−8.2 (17.2)	0.5 (32.9)	7.0 (44.6)	10.4 (50.7)	16.3 (61.3)	15.3 (59.5)	8.0 (46.4)	−2.5 (27.5)	−8.4 (16.9)	−15.1 (4.8)	−18.4 (−1.1)
Average precipitation mm (inches)	2.9 (0.11)	6.5 (0.26)	6.5 (0.26)	21.7 (0.85)	41.4 (1.63)	74.1 (2.92)	147.6 (5.81)	133.7 (5.26)	57.3 (2.26)	32.5 (1.28)	12.4 (0.49)	3.3 (0.13)	539.9 (21.26)
Average precipitation days (≥ 0.1 mm)	1.8	2.4	2.7	4.8	6.1	8.3	10.6	9.2	5.9	4.9	3.0	2.0	61.7
Average snowy days	3.2	2.6	0.9	0.1	0	0	0	0	0	0.1	1.5	2.9	11.3
Average relative humidity (%)	54	54	50	51	54	65	73	73	65	59	58	55	59
Mean monthly sunshine hours	166.0	170.7	224.7	242.9	269.8	233.1	199.8	204.9	207.5	194.4	157.1	154.5	2,425.4
Percentage possible sunshine	55	56	60	61	61	53	44	49	56	57	53	53	55
Source: China Meteorological Administration

== See also ==
- Port of Tianjin
