= Binhai, Tianjin =

Coordinates: 39°00′12″N 117°42′39″E

Binhai 滨海新区
- District and State-level new area
- Binhai New Area
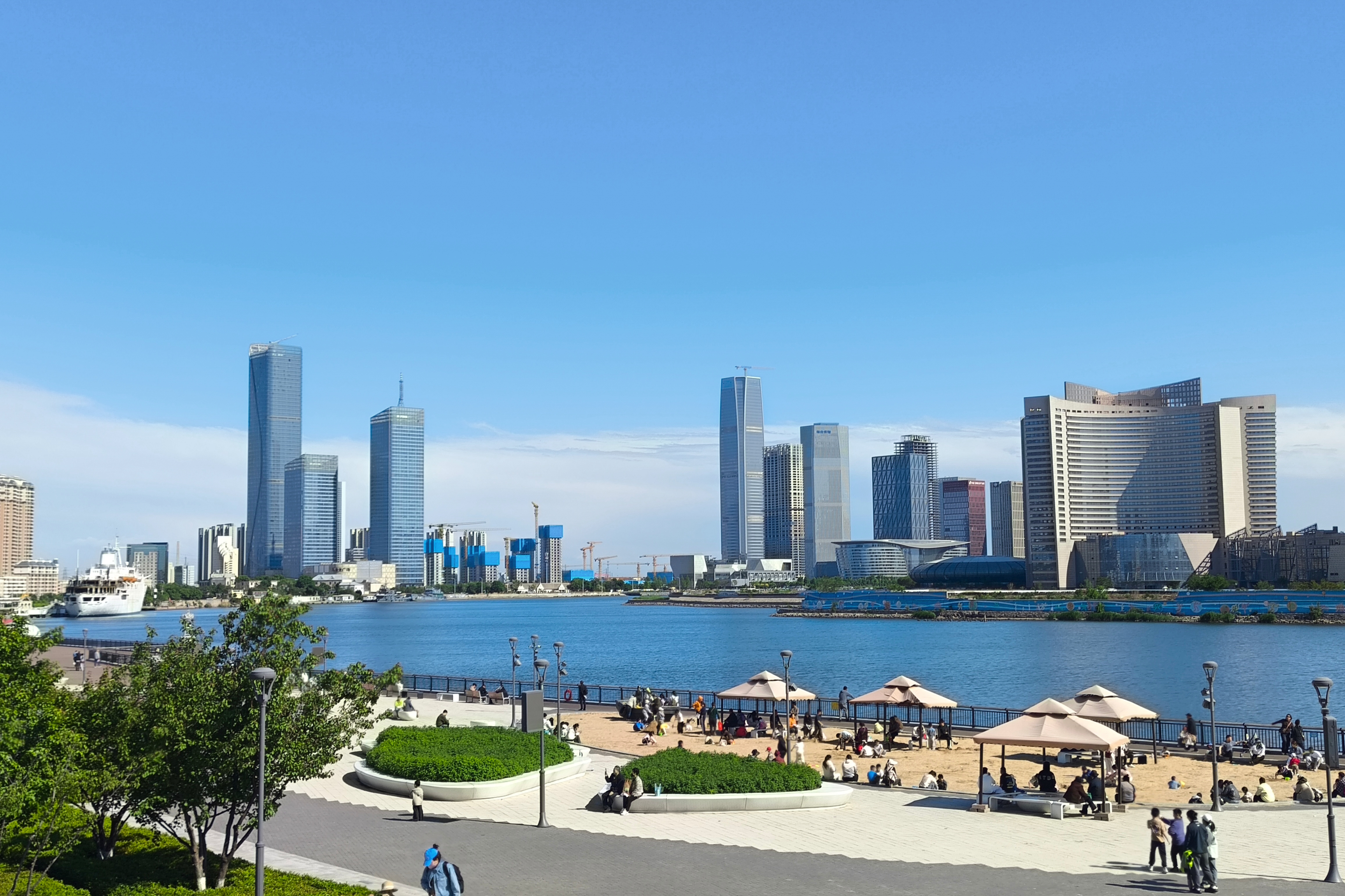
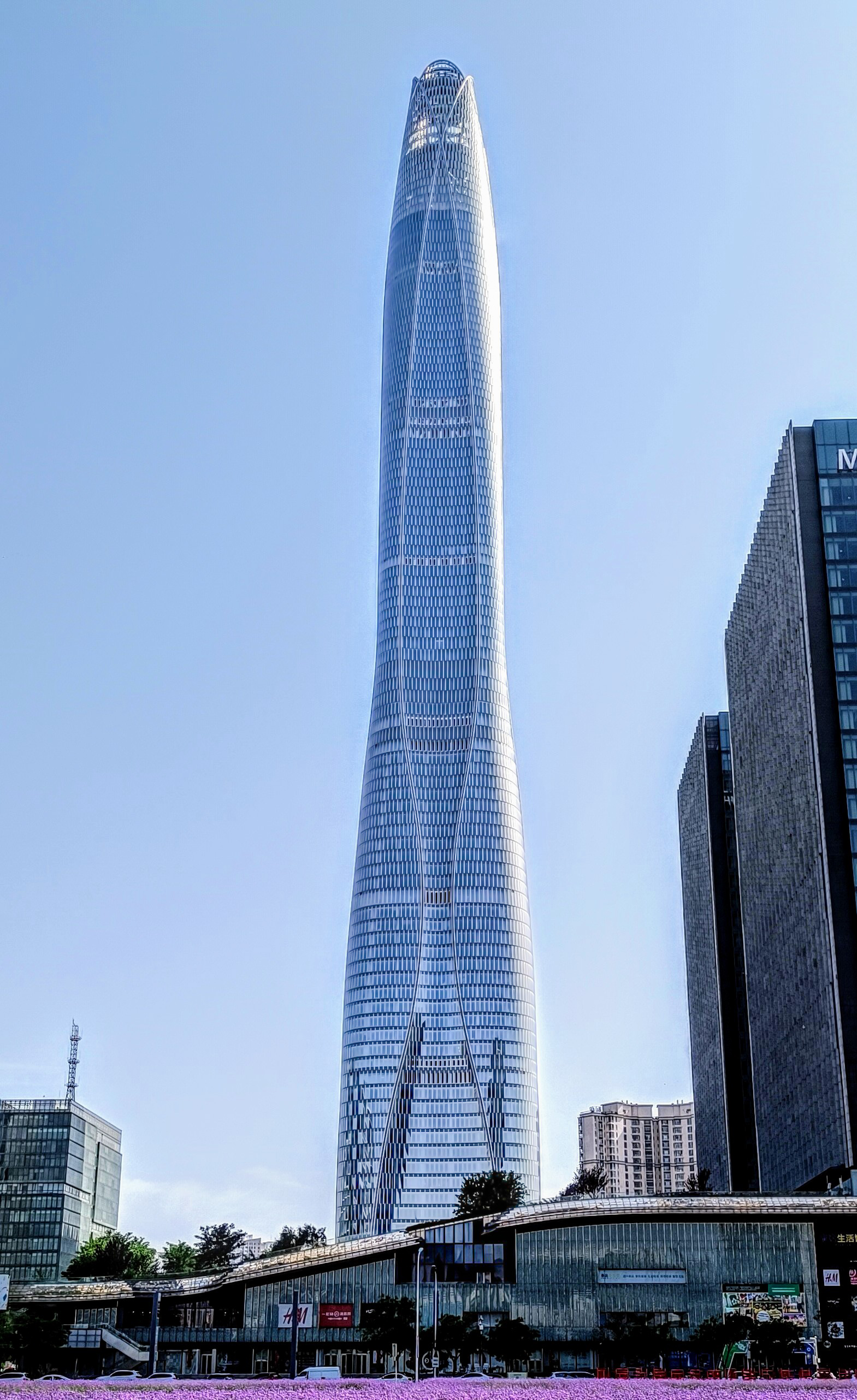
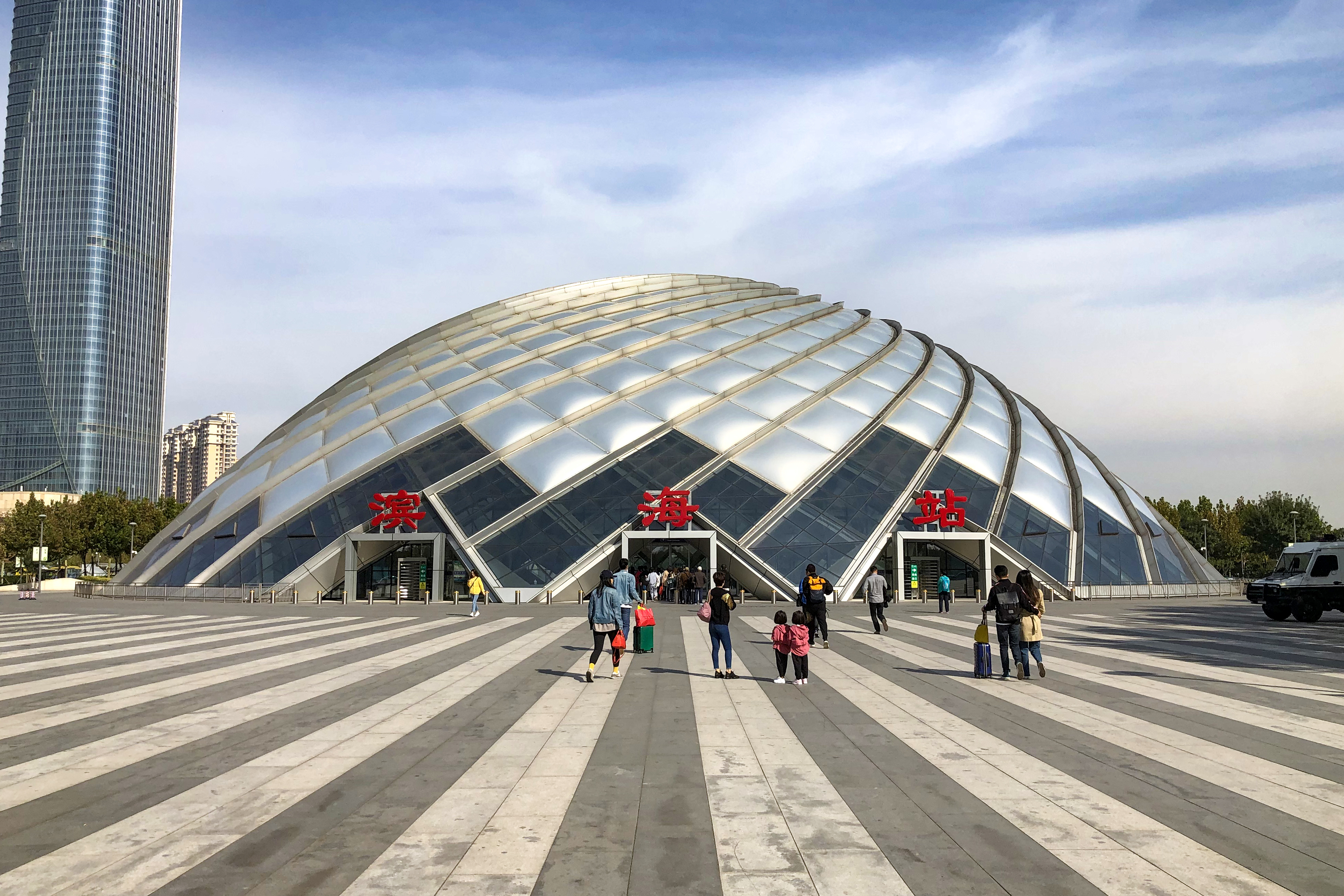
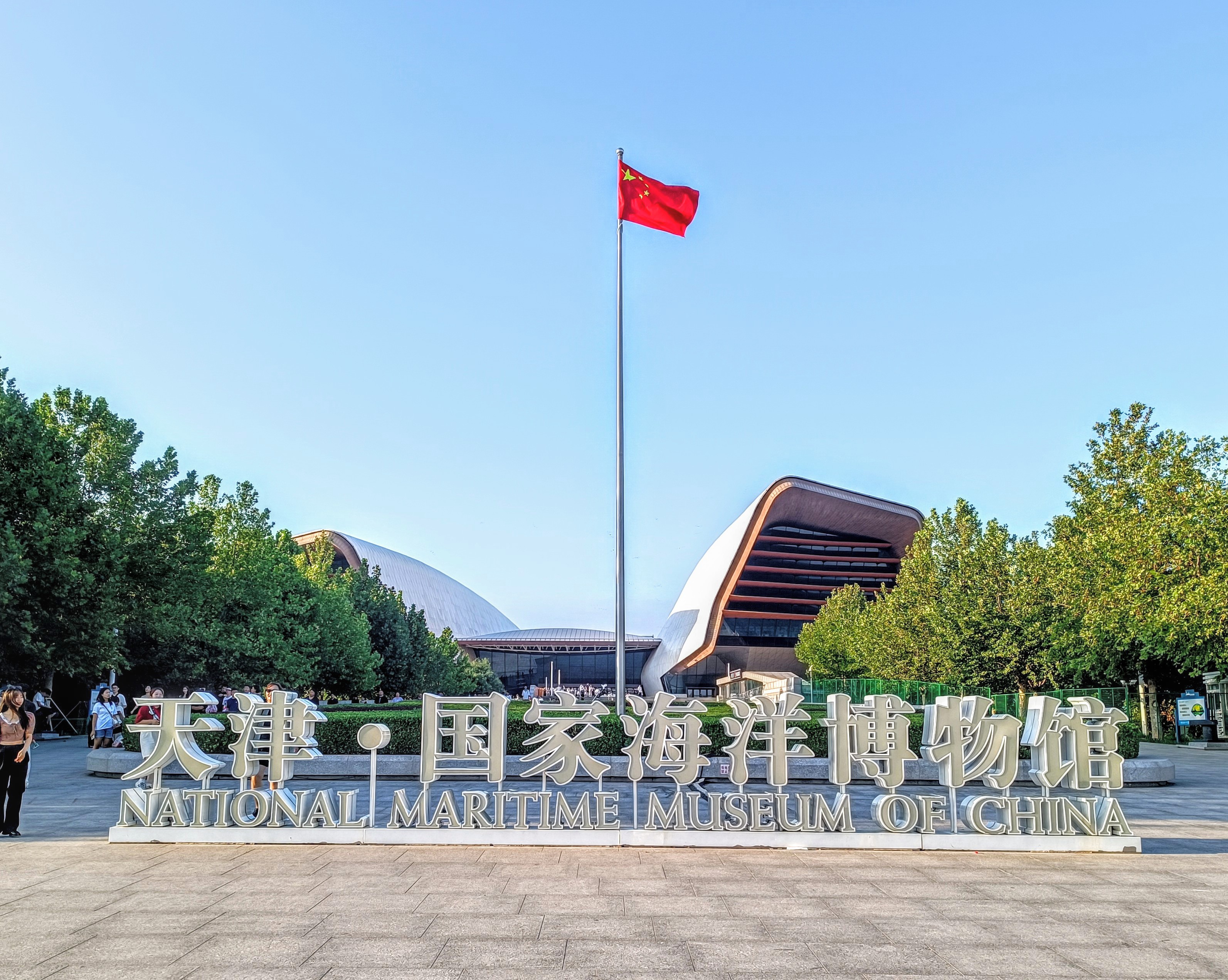
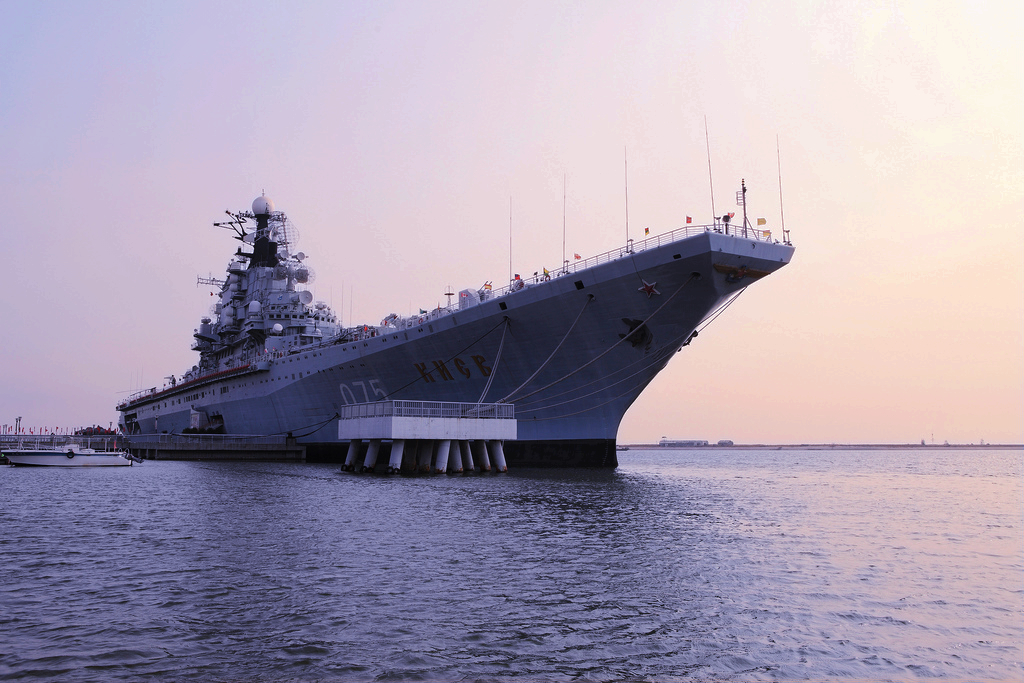
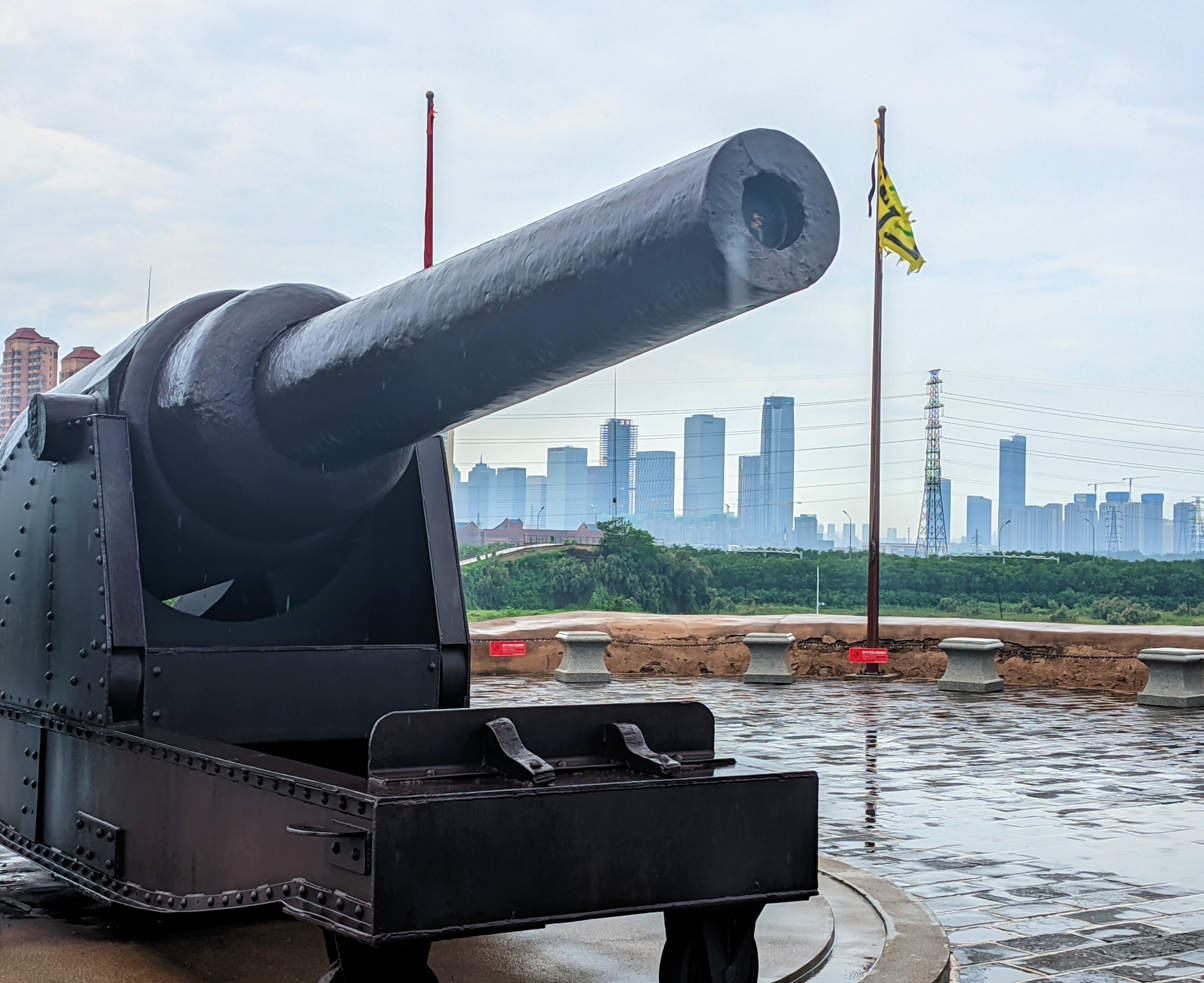
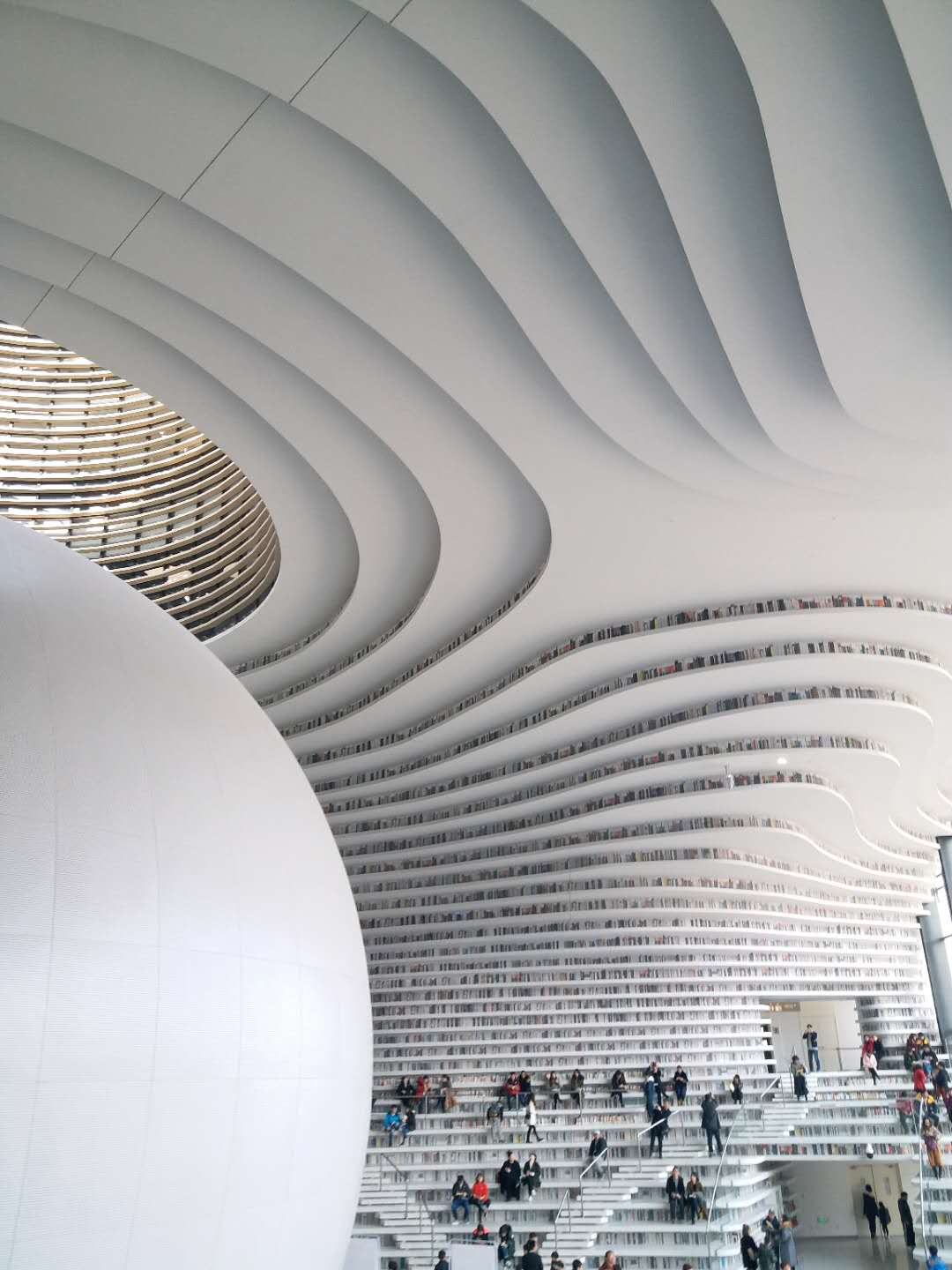
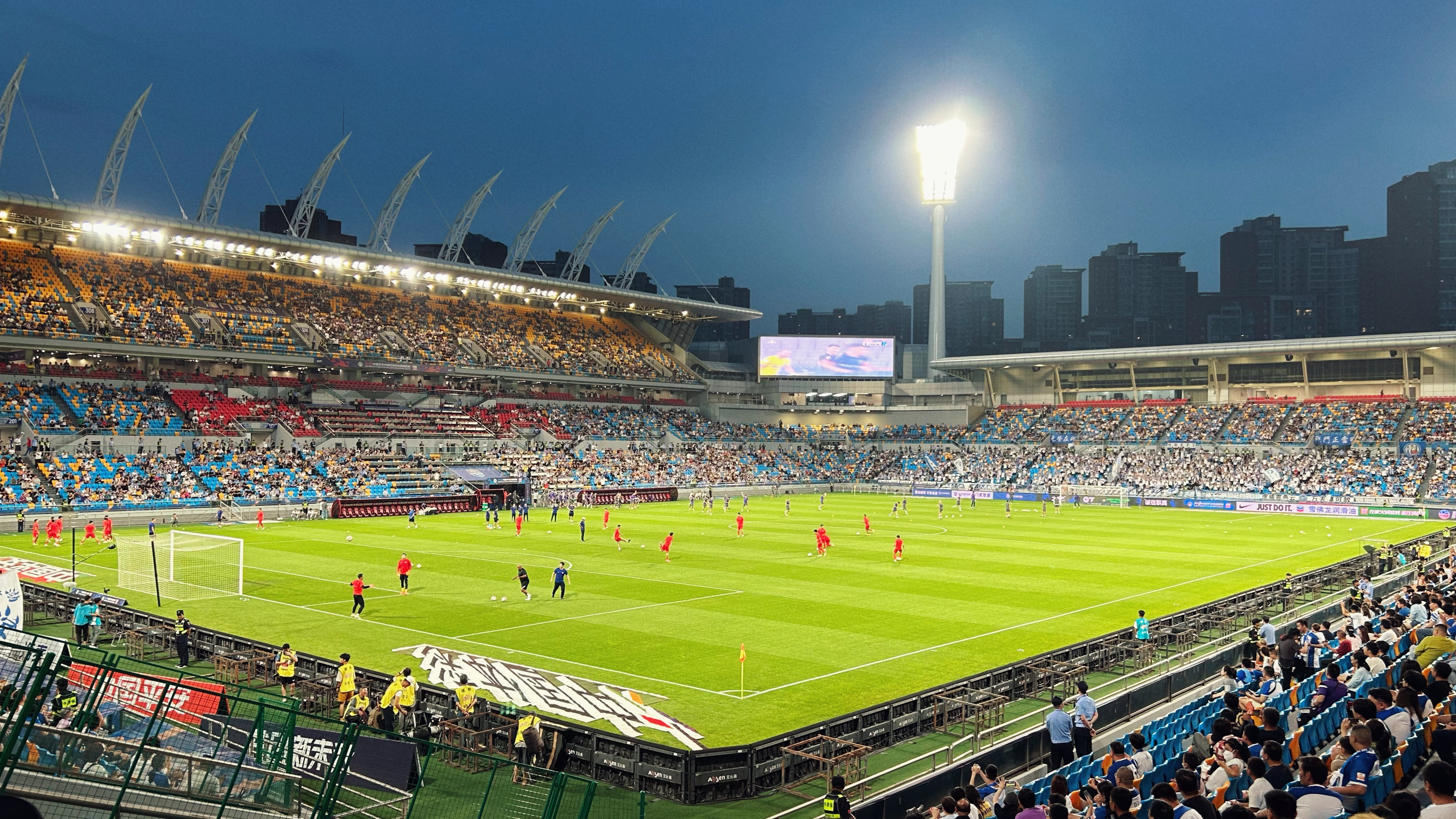
- View of Binhai New Area CTF Finance Centre Binhai railway station National Maritime Museum of China Museum of aircraft carrier Kiev Dagu Fort Binhai Library TEDA Soccer Stadium
- Interactive map of Binhai
- Country: People's Republic of China
- Municipality: Tianjin
- Township-level divisions: 19 subdistricts 7 towns
- District established: 2009

Government
  - CPC Secretary: Zhang Yuzhuo
  - District Governor: Yang Maorong

Area
  - Total: 2,270 km^{2} (880 sq mi)

Population (2009)
  - Total: 1,185,700
  - Density: 522/km^{2} (1,350/sq mi)
- Time zone: UTC+8 (China Standard)
- Postal Code: 300000-301900
- Area code: 022
- Website: www.tjbh.gov.cn

Binhai, Tianjin
- Traditional Chinese: 濱海新區
- Simplified Chinese: 滨海新区
Transcriptions
Standard Mandarin
- Hanyu Pinyin: Bīnhǎi Xīn Qū

Binhai, fully known as Binhai New Area (Chinese: 滨海新区; pinyin: Bīnhǎi Xīn Qū), abbreviated as Bincheng, is a sub-provincial division, new area and special economic zone of China under the jurisdiction of Tianjin, People's Republic of China, located in the eastern coastal area of Tianjin, the center of the Bohai Economic Rim, with a total area of 2,270 square kilometers and a population of 2,067,300, It is the gateway to opening up to the outside world in northern China, a high-level modern manufacturing and R&D transformation base, a northern international shipping center and international logistics center, and a livable and ecological new urban area.

Binhai New Area is an important part of China (Tianjin) Pilot Free Trade Zone, a state-level new area, and a national comprehensive supporting reform pilot area.

== Geography ==
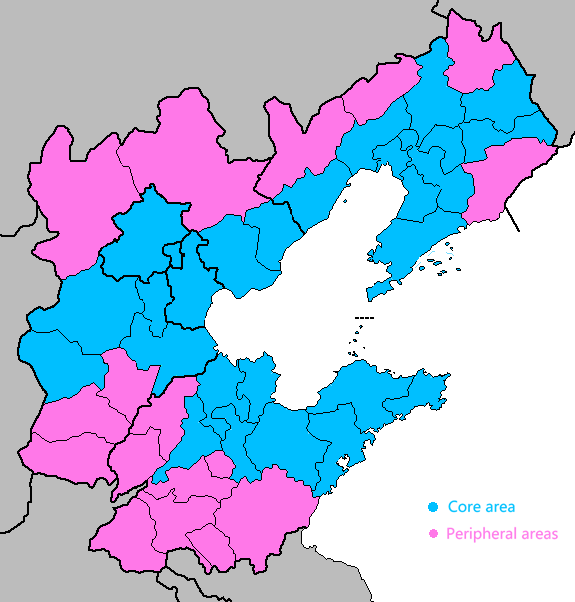
Map of Bohai Economic Rim

Binhai is located on the west coast of the Bohai Sea and east of Tianjin's main urban area. It is a part of the Bohai Economic Rim. It has an area of 3,000 km^{2} (1,200 sq mi), a coastline of 153 km (95 mi), and contains 700 km^{2} (270 sq mi) of water and wetlands.

=== Natural resources ===
Binhai New Area has 700 square kilometers (270 sq mi) of water and wetlands and a further 1,200 km^{2} (460 sq mi) of wasteland that is being re-developed into saline land. It has proven oil resources totalling more than 100 million tons, and 193.7 billion cubic meters (6.84 trillion cubic feet) of natural gas.

=== Administrative divisions ===
There are 19 subdistricts and 7 towns in the district:

Name	Chinese (S)	Hanyu Pinyin	Population (2010)	Area (km^{2})
Tanggu Subdistrict	塘沽街道	Tánggū Jiēdào	not established	
Hangzhou Street Subdistrict	杭州道街道	Hángzhōudào Jiēdào	112,173	5.412
Xinhe Subdistrict	新河街道	Xīnhé Jiēdào	73,160	
Dagu Subdistrict (Taku)	大沽街道	Dàgū Jiēdào	43,425	138.24
Xinbei Subdistrict	新北街道	Xīnběi Jiēdào	80,702	
Beitang Subdistrict	北塘街道	Běitáng Jiēdào	16,406	117
Hujiayuan Subdistrict	胡家园街道	Hújiāyuán Jiēdào	117,235	75.2
Hangu Subdistrict	汉沽街道	Hàngū Jiēdào	50,685	4.6
Zhaishang Subdistrict	寨上街道	Zhàishàng Jiēdào	66,510	4.8
Chadian Subdistrict	茶淀街道	Chádiàn Jiēdào	28,050	17.3
Dagang Subdistrict	大港街道	Dàgǎng Jiēdào	91,776	4.9
Gulin Subdistrict	古林街道	Gǔlín Jiēdào	47050	209
Haibin Subdistrict	海滨街道	Hǎibīn Jiēdào	146,009	118
Xincheng town	新城镇	Xīnchéng Zhèn	43,128	31
Yangjiabo town	杨家泊镇	Yángjiāpō Zhèn	21,559	60.7
Taiping town	太平镇	Tàipíng Zhèn	37,074	174.7
Xiaowangzhuang town	小王庄镇	Xiǎowángzhuāng Zhèn	23,084	27.8
Zhongtang town	中塘镇	Zhōngtáng Zhèn	55,586	30.2
developmental, industrial and harbor zones	开发区/类似乡级单位	Kāifā Qū/Lèisì Xiāng Jí Dānwèi	831,979	

- Defunct
  - Now part of Tanggu: Yujiapu Subdistrict, Xingang Subdistrict, Xincun Subdistrict north
  - Now part of Hangzhou Street: Xiangyang Subdistrict
  - Now part of Dagu: Bohaishiyou Subdistrict, Xincun Subdistrict south
  - Now part of Hangu: Datian town
  - Now part of Chadian: Hexi Subdistrict
  - Now part of Dagang: Yingbin Subdistrict, Shengli Subdistrict
  - Now part of Haibin: Gangxi Subdistrict

== History ==
The Binhai district was created by the government of China in the 1990s. In 1996 Soviet aircraft carrier Kiev was sold to Binhai Aircraft Park, a theme park in Binhai. The concept was developed by world tourism and attraction consultant Leisure Quest International.

In August 2011, the ex-Kiev was developed into a luxury hotel after renovations costing £9.6 million.

Starting from November 2009, Binhai New Area was consolidated into a district, and the former subordinate districts of Tanggu, Hangu and Dagang were abolished. Binhai New Area consists of nine functional zones: Advanced Manufacturing Zone, Airport-based Industrial Zone, Binhai High-tech Industrial Development Zone, Seaport-based Industrial Zone, Nangang Industrial Zone, Seaport Logistics Zone, Coastal Leisure & Tourism Zone, Sino-Singapore Tianjin Eco-City and the Yujiapu Financial District. In addition, Tianjin Port whose throughput ranks 5th in the world is also located here.

The Binhai district was greatly affected by a large industrial-scale accident in August 2015. On August 12, a series of explosions took place at a port chemical storage facility in Binhai, causing 173 deaths and 797 injuries. The blast had the equivalent of 21 metric tons of TNT or a magnitude-2.9 earthquake, according to the China Earthquake Networks Center. Eight other people remain missing.

== Economy ==
Yujiapu Financial District located in Binhai is an under construction financial district with a glitzy skyline envisioned to be a center of world trade and finance. Other parts of Binhai have also been intended to be a base for China's advanced industrial and financial reform and innovation. The Tianjin Economic-Technological Development Area (TEDA) is an early free trade zone.

Tianjin Emissions Exchange organized China's first sulfur dioxide, carbon neutral, contract energy management and energy efficiency product transactions, and established China's first voluntary emission reduction public inquiry system.

A number of major international companies including Rockefeller, Tishman Speyer, Motorola and Airbus have built branches here. For instance, EADS Airbus has already opened an assembly plant for its A320 series airliners, operational since 2009. Domestic companies headquartered in Binhai include noodlemaker Tingyi.

In October 2024, the China Resources Recycling Group was established in the Sino-Singapore Tianjin Eco-city.

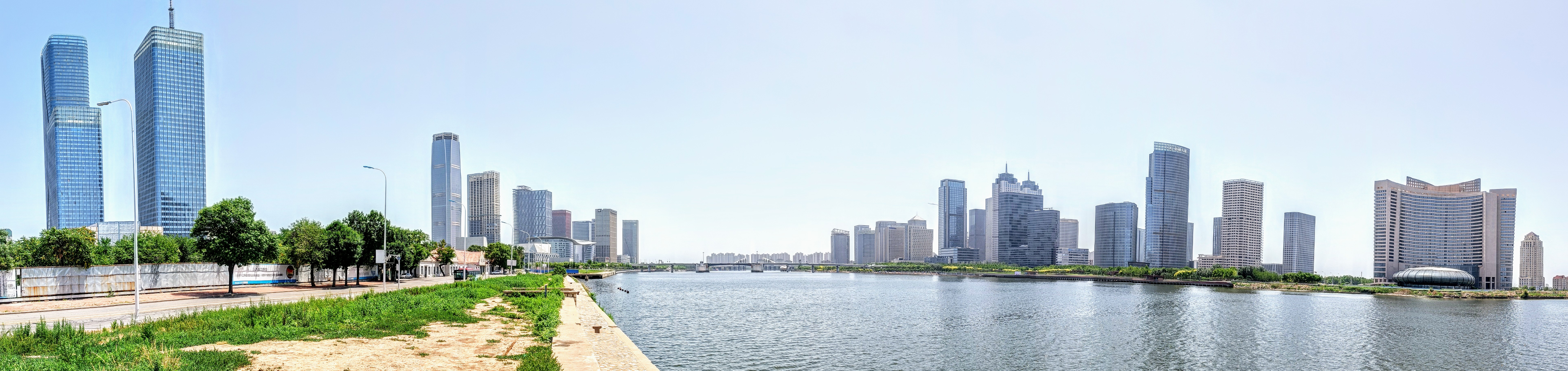
Tianjin Binhai New Area Yujiapu Xiangluowan in 2023

== Culture ==
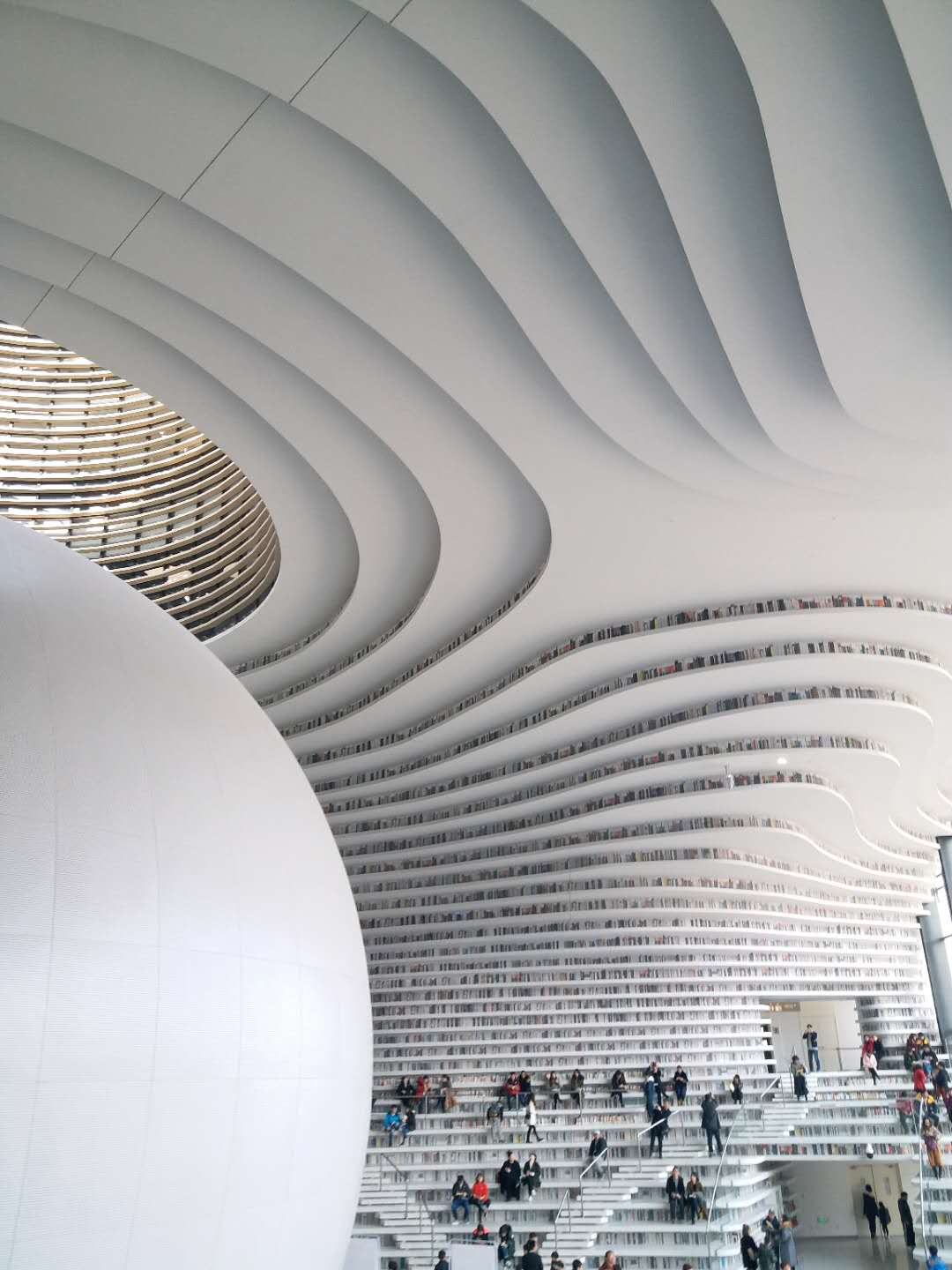
Tianjin Binhai Library

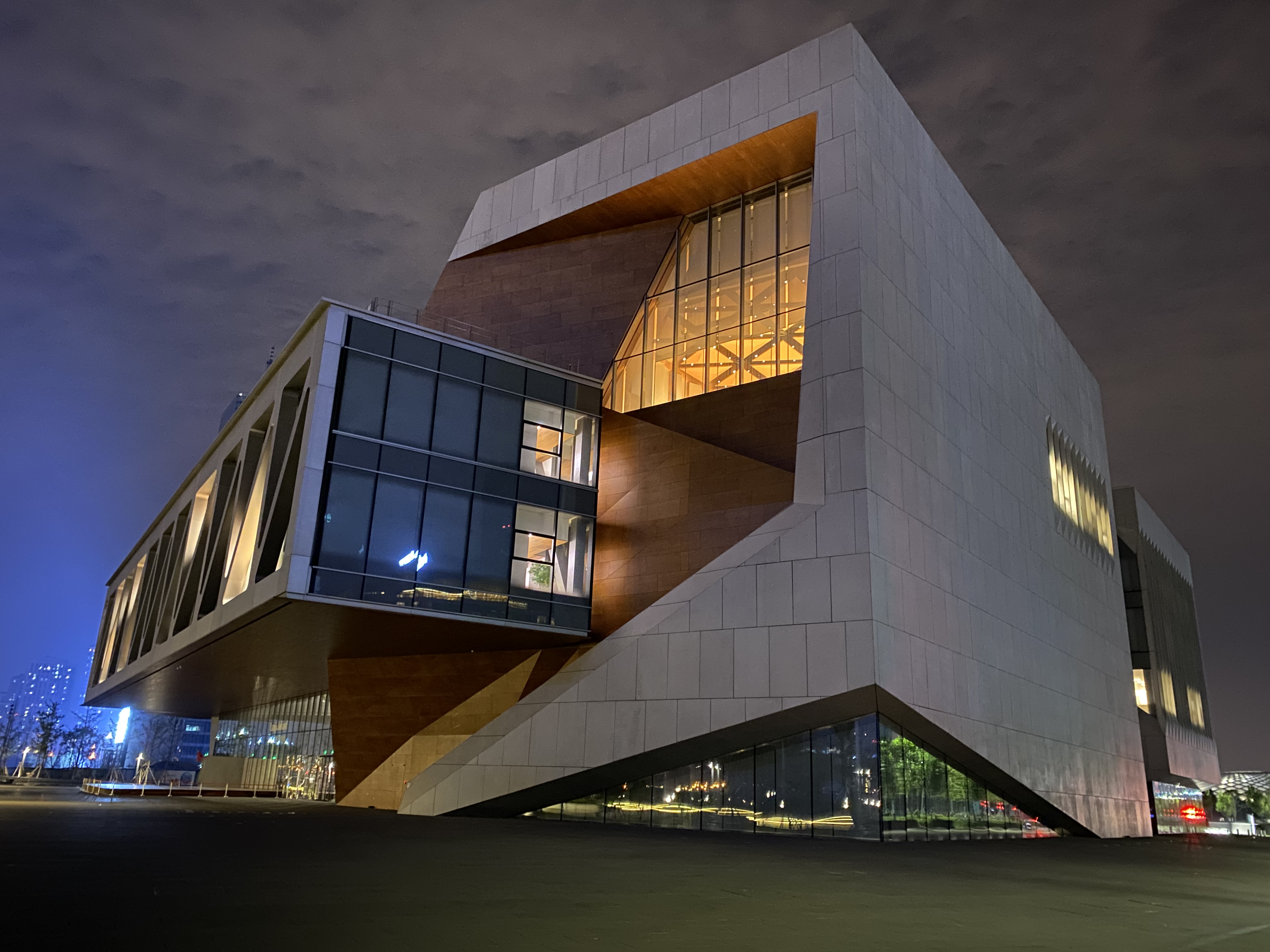
Tianjin Juilliard School in Binhai, Tianjin

A large culture complex, Binhai Cultural Center, with five central attractions planned. The centerpiece of the complex is the library that opened in November 2017. The library is nicknamed 'The Eye' because the sphere, which appears like an iris, can be seen from the park outside through an eye-shaped opening.

The remnant of Taku Forts in the form of a gun platform overlooks the Hai River (Peiho River) in Binhai.

== Education ==
Many colleges and universities in Tianjin have branch campuses in Binhai New Area. In 2003, Nankai University established the TEDA Campus in the Tianjin Economic-Technological Development Area, which is dedicated to research on genomes, functional genomics, biochips, and molecular virology. Tianjin University of Science and Technology will move into Binhai New Area as a whole. The Juilliard College of New York and the Tianjin Conservatory of Music cooperated with the Juilliard Research Institute of the Tianjin Conservatory of Music in the Yujiapu Financial District to provide pre-university and postgraduate education. At the same time, Tianjin Maritime Vocational College, Tianjin Development Zone Vocational and Technical College and Tianjin Binhai Vocational College are located in Binhai New Area.

== Transportation ==
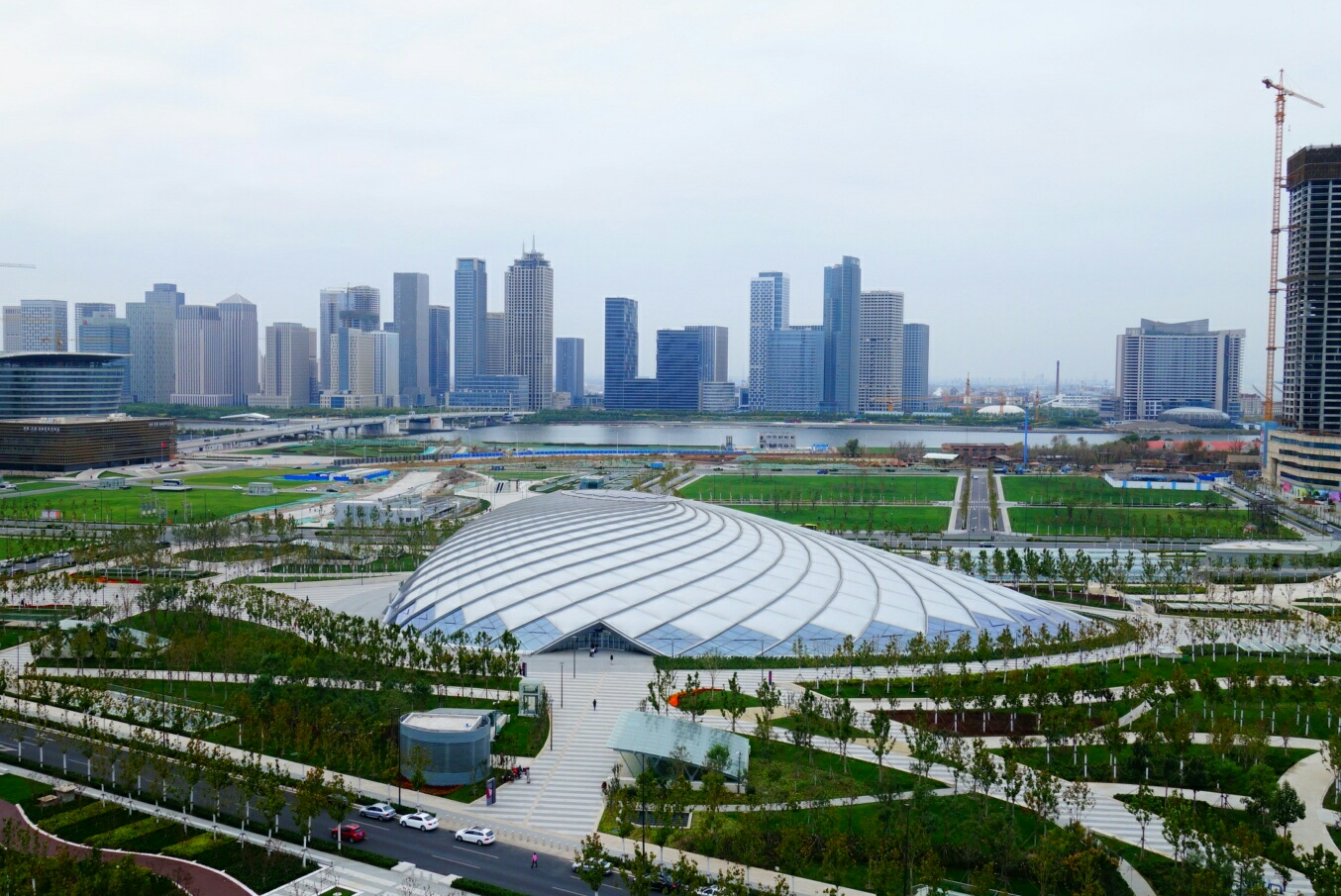
Binhai railway station

=== Rail ===
High speed rail stops in Binhai with Binhai railway station and Tanggu railway station on the Beijing-Tianjin Intercity Railway. Binhai West railway station and Binhai North railway station are stops along the Tianjin–Qinhuangdao High-Speed Railway. Tanggu railway station is also a station on the conventional speed Tianjin–Shanhaiguan Railway.

=== Metro ===
Binhai is currently served by one metro line and one tram line operated by Tianjin Metro:

- Line 9 - Hujiayuan, Tanggu, TEDA, Citizen Plaza, Convention and Exhibition Center Station, Donghai Road
- TEDA Tram - TEDA, First Avenue, Second Avenue, Third Avenue, Fourth Avenue, Fifth Avenue, Sixth Avenue, Seventh Avenue, Ninth Avenue, Tenth Avenue, Eleventh Avenue, International Joint Academy, College District, North of College District

=== Road ===
There are 11 expressways (include 5 national expressways and 6 provincial expressways), 3 national highways and several provincial and county-level highways run through Binhai.

- G0111 runs through northeast coastline, west part and southeast coastline of Binhai.
- G0211 starts at Nangang Industrial Zone, on the south of Binhai.
- G0212 (formerly) ends at Hebei Road, on the middle-west of Binhai.
- G25 runs through west part of Binhai.
- G2502 starts at Dashentang, on the northeast of Binhai.
- ends at G103, near Hujiayuan station of line 9.
- ends at Dagang College Town.
- runs through middle coastline.
- starts at Ningchegu, on the north of Binhai.
- ends at Dongjiang Port Area, on the east of Binhai.
- starts at Lingang Industrial Zone, on the east of Binhai.
- G103 ends at Gate IV of Tianjin Port.
- G228 runs through Lutai, Hangu, Beitang, Xinjiayuan, Hujiayuan, Dengshangu, Guangang, Gangdong New Town, Dagang Oil Field and Mapengkou towns of eastern Tianjin.
- G336 starts at Qingfang Economical Zone of Dagang.

== See also ==
- Tianjin Joyful Sea Magic Cube
