= China National Highway 336 =

Highway in China

National Highway 336
- 336国道

Major junctions
- From: Tianjin
- To: Shenmu, Shaanxi

Location
- Country: China

Highway system
- National Trunk Highway System; Primary; Auxiliary
← G335	→ G337

China National Highway 336 (G336) runs from Tianjin to Shenmu, Shaanxi.

== See also ==
- China National Highways
