= Ninghe, Tianjin =

Ninghe 宁河区 Ningho
- District
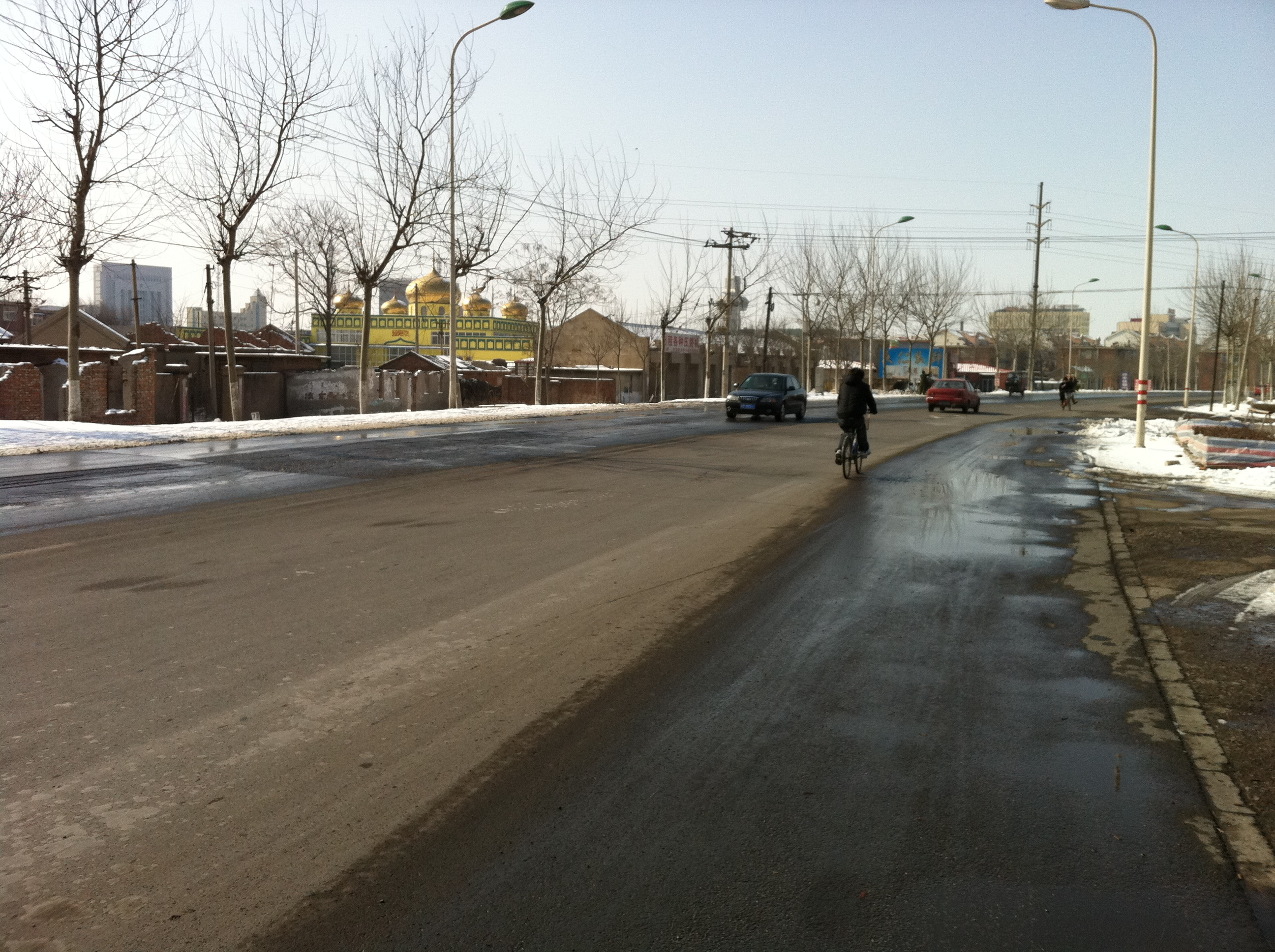
- Coordinates: 39°20′N 117°49′E
- Country: People's Republic of China
- Municipality: Tianjin
- Township-level divisions: 11 towns 3 townships

Area
  - Total: 1,154 km^{2} (446 sq mi)
- Elevation: 4 m (13 ft)

Population (2020)
  - Total: 395,333
  - Density: 342.6/km^{2} (887.3/sq mi)
- Time zone: UTC+8 (China Standard)
- Postal code: 301500
- Area code: 0022
Tianjin district map
Subdivisions of Tianjin
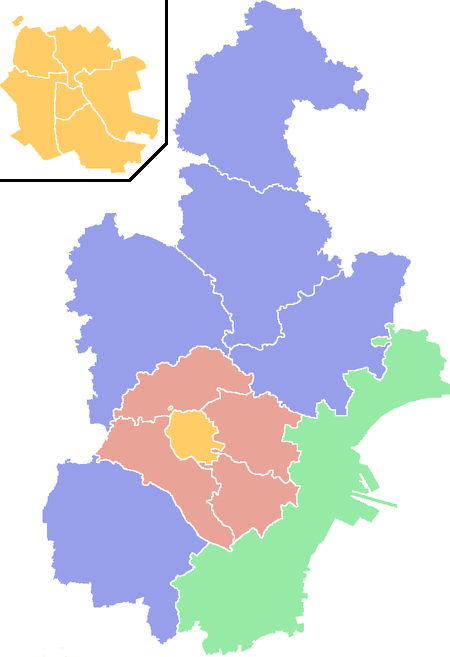
Core districts See inset
1	Heping
2	Hedong
3	Hexi
4	Nankai
5	Hebei
6	Hongqiao
Suburbs
7	Dongli
8	Xiqing
9	Jinnan
10	Beichen
Binhai and Rural
13	Binhai	14	Ninghe
11	Wuqing	15	Jinghai
12	Baodi	16	Ji Zhou

Ninghe District (simplified Chinese: 宁河区; traditional Chinese: 寧河區; pinyin: Nínghé Qū; lit. 'Tranquil River'), formerly Ninghe County, is a district of the municipality of Tianjin, People's Republic of China, located in the rural northeast part of the municipality. Inside this district, there are three enclaves. Two belongs to neighbour Tangshan: Lutai Economic Development Zone and Hangu Administration Zone. The last one, the Qinghe Farm, is administered by Beijing Municipal Administration of Prisons.

== Administrative divisions ==
There are 11 towns and 3 townships in the district:

Name	Chinese (S)	Hanyu Pinyin	Population (2010)	Area (km^{2})
Lutai town	芦台镇	Lútái Zhèn	136,379	
Fengtai town	丰台镇	Fēngtái Zhèn	23,790	84
Yuelong town	岳龙镇	Yuèlóng Zhèn	15,014	
Ninghe town	宁河镇	Níng hé Zhèn	21,689	83
Miaozhuang town	苗庄镇	Miáozhuāng Zhèn	17,296	61
Qilihai town	七里海镇	Qīlǐhǎi Zhèn	28,007	59.5
Dongjituo town	东棘坨镇	Dōngjítuó Zhèn	29,769	164
Zaojiacheng town	造甲城镇	Zàojiǎchéng Zhèn	29,536	108
Panzhuang town	潘庄镇	Pānzhuāng Zhèn	30,213	114.5
Banqiao town	板桥镇	Bǎnqiáo Zhèn	10,152	
Dabeijiangu town	大北涧沽镇	Dàběijiàngū Zhèn	14,846	2.5
Lianzhuang Township	廉庄乡	Liánzhuāng Xiāng	17,315	
Biaokou Township	俵口乡	Biàokǒu Xiāng	20,501	46
Beihuaidian Township	北淮淀乡	Běihuáidiàn Xiāng	20,936	64
farming zones			700	

== Climate ==
Climate data for Ninghe District, elevation 3 m (9.8 ft), (1991–2020 normals, extremes 1981–2010)
Month	Jan	Feb	Mar	Apr	May	Jun	Jul	Aug	Sep	Oct	Nov	Dec	Year
Record high °C (°F)	13.2 (55.8)	19.4 (66.9)	28.8 (83.8)	32.5 (90.5)	37.8 (100.0)	37.9 (100.2)	40.0 (104.0)	36.2 (97.2)	35.2 (95.4)	30.2 (86.4)	21.6 (70.9)	14.4 (57.9)	40.0 (104.0)
Mean daily maximum °C (°F)	1.5 (34.7)	5.0 (41.0)	11.7 (53.1)	19.6 (67.3)	25.6 (78.1)	28.9 (84.0)	30.6 (87.1)	30.0 (86.0)	26.2 (79.2)	19.2 (66.6)	10.1 (50.2)	3.0 (37.4)	17.6 (63.7)
Daily mean °C (°F)	−3.9 (25.0)	−0.6 (30.9)	6.1 (43.0)	13.9 (57.0)	20.1 (68.2)	24.1 (75.4)	26.5 (79.7)	25.8 (78.4)	21.1 (70.0)	13.7 (56.7)	5.0 (41.0)	−1.8 (28.8)	12.5 (54.5)
Mean daily minimum °C (°F)	−8.2 (17.2)	−5.2 (22.6)	1.2 (34.2)	8.8 (47.8)	15.0 (59.0)	19.6 (67.3)	22.8 (73.0)	22.0 (71.6)	16.6 (61.9)	9.0 (48.2)	0.9 (33.6)	−5.6 (21.9)	8.1 (46.5)
Record low °C (°F)	−22.7 (−8.9)	−19.5 (−3.1)	−11.9 (10.6)	−2.0 (28.4)	5.6 (42.1)	10.1 (50.2)	15.4 (59.7)	14.0 (57.2)	5.9 (42.6)	−3.4 (25.9)	−9.2 (15.4)	−17.0 (1.4)	−22.7 (−8.9)
Average precipitation mm (inches)	2.2 (0.09)	5.1 (0.20)	5.7 (0.22)	20.6 (0.81)	39.3 (1.55)	68.7 (2.70)	163.9 (6.45)	120.6 (4.75)	49.4 (1.94)	32.5 (1.28)	11.7 (0.46)	3.3 (0.13)	523 (20.58)
Average precipitation days (≥ 0.1 mm)	1.5	2.2	2.6	4.6	6.0	8.7	10.7	9.5	6.0	4.6	2.9	2.0	61.3
Average snowy days	2.4	2.3	0.8	0.1	0	0	0	0	0	0	1.5	2.6	9.7
Average relative humidity (%)	59	59	56	54	59	69	79	80	73	67	65	62	65
Mean monthly sunshine hours	177.5	178.4	223.4	237.5	262.6	230.7	193.5	206.3	209.6	196.8	163.8	165.4	2,445.5
Percentage possible sunshine	59	59	60	60	59	52	43	49	57	58	55	57	56
Source: China Meteorological Administration
