= Jean Pasqualini =

French and Chinese journalist

- Born: 1926; Beijing, China
- Died: 9 October 1997 (aged 70–71); Le Kremlin-Bicêtre, France
- Other name: Bao Ruowang
- Occupations: Journalist, author
- Known for: Imprisonment in the Chinese Laogai

Jean Pasqualini (simplified Chinese: 鲍若望; traditional Chinese: 鮑若望; pinyin: Bào Ruòwàng; 1926 – 9 October 1997) was a French and Chinese journalist who wrote a memoir of his experiences as a political prisoner in the laogai labor camp system. Born in Beijing, Jean Pasqualini was the son of a Chinese mother and a Corsican French father. His Chinese name is rendered as Bao Ruowang, with "Bao" representing the first syllable in Pasqualini and "Ruowang" being a phonetic rendering of Jean.

== Biography ==
As a child, Jean Pasqualini attended school in Tianjin and Shanghai. During the Second World War and after, he worked as a translator for the U.S. military and the British Embassy in Beijing prior to the Communist Party takeover in 1949. During the political campaigns of 1957, Pasqualini was sentenced to 12 years in detention and was accused of "counter-revolutionary activity" on the basis of his work with foreigners. He was released in 1964 after France established diplomatic relations with the People's Republic of China. Following his release, he was expelled and moved to Paris.

In 1973, along with co-author Rudolph Chelminski, Pasqualini published his autobiography Prisoner of Mao. The book recounted his experiences as a prisoner from 1957 to 1964, including 15 months of interrogation that led to a 700-page confession. Pasqualini recalled the experience of the Great Chinese Famine and of being privately warned by a labor camp doctor not to eat the adulterated food that had been mixed with sawdust. He also detailed at length the daily criticism and self-criticism sessions. Over the course of his imprisonment, Jean Pasqualini wrote that he lost the capacity for independent thought, his defiance and skepticism gradually giving way to acceptance of his own guilt.

I would defy any man, Chinese or not, to hold out against them. Their aim is not so much to make you invent nonexistent crimes, but to make you accept your ordinary life, as you led it, as rotten and sinful and worthy of punishment.

— Jean Pasqualini, Prisoner of Mao

Pasqualini spent his later years in France working as a translator and researcher for Newsweek and Life magazine. In 1992, he co-founded the Laogai Research Foundation with Harry Wu. He died in a Paris hospital in 1997.

== Influence ==
Pasqualini's account of life in the labor camp system was a major source for The Black Book of Communism. His book has been translated into several languages, and was made into a French-language movie in 1977. It has been described as the first autobiographical account of life in China's labor camp system.

When Pasqualini's book was initially published, he was criticized and denounced by French supporters of the Communist Revolution who, according to Seth Faison, "refused to believe that the seemingly utopian nation of happy peasants and workers ... could have such a dark side." In 1978, Belgian sinologist Pierre Ryckmans described Prisoner of Mao as the "most fundamental document on the Maoist ‘Gulag’ and, as such, the most studiously ignored by the lobby that maintains that there is no human-rights problem in the People's Republic." Criticism subsided years later as more information emerged to corroborate Pasqualini's account, and Chinese authorities admitted to the excesses of the period.

== See also ==
- Human rights in the People's Republic of China
- List of Re-education Through Labor camps in China
