= Mao Hengfeng =

Chinese activist

- Born: 毛恒凤; 9 December 1961 (age 64)
- Occupation: Activist

Mao Hengfeng (simplified Chinese: 毛恒凤; Traditional Chinese: 毛恆鳳; pinyin: Máo Héngfēng; born 9 December 1961) is a women's rights and human rights activist in the People's Republic of China. She refused to abort her third child after already having twins and was detained in an ankang (psychiatric hospital) and then dismissed from her job. A frequent petitioner, Mao served a year and a half of re-education through labor from 2004 to 2005 and two and half years in prison for "intentional destruction of property" in from 2006 to 2008. She was released from Shanghai Women's Prison on 29 November 2008. Since then she has served another year in RTL after protesting in support of Liu Xiaobo. She was briefly released, in February 2011, but under house arrest. She was almost immediately taken again, and placed in Shanghai City Prison Hospital, where she was previously tortured and ill-treated.

== Background ==
A mother of twins, Mao Hengfeng was reportedly dismissed from her job at a Shanghai soap factory in 1988 because she became pregnant for a second time with a third child, in contravention of China's family planning regulations. Mao refused to have an abortion, and was subsequently detained in a psychiatric hospital. She gave birth on 28 February 1989, and was notified on 20 March that she had been dismissed from her job for missing sixteen days of work. This was the period when she was giving birth and recuperating, as well as recovering from her ordeal in the psychiatric institute.

== Appeal and petitions ==
Mao Hengfeng appealed against her dismissal under China's Labour Law, and was reinstated to her job. However, the soap factory disputed the ruling. Mao was seven months pregnant with her fourth child at the time of the appeal hearing, when the judge reportedly told her that if she terminated this third pregnancy he would rule in her favour. Concerned for the welfare of her existing family, Mao terminated her pregnancy against her wishes, but still the court ruled against her, apparently because she had taken sixteen days of "unauthorized leave" from work, and also for her original violation of family planning policies.

From 1990 to 2004 Mao repeatedly petitioned the authorities for redress for her dismissal from work, her forced abortion, and the denial of other basic rights including that of freedom of expression. She also made several attempts to initiate legal proceedings against the authorities in relation to these abuses, but courts repeatedly failed to respond or refused to file the cases.

As well as actively petitioning authorities to seek redress for herself, Mao Hengfeng has also acted to safeguard the rights of others. For example, she is known to have actively supported other people seeking redress over alleged forced evictions in Shanghai and Shanxi province, and is reportedly regarded by the Shanghai authorities as one of the city's most persistent and experienced petitioners. She is actively campaigning on behalf of other individuals arbitrarily detained in "Re-education Through Labour" or psychiatric facilities, including women held for alleged violation of family planning policies.

She opposes arbitrary detention and campaigns for legal reforms that ensure redress and protect ordinary people against abuse of power.

More recently she was arrested due to her protest in support of human rights activist Liu Xiaobo.

== 2004–2005 ==
Mao Hengfeng was assigned without trial to eighteen months' "Re-education through labor" (RTL) in April 2004 after repeatedly protesting about various abuses of her rights. Her welfare allowances were discontinued, leaving her family in severe financial difficulties. Many people in Shanghai openly demonstrated in support of her.

On 13 September 2005, Mao and her husband, Wu Xuewei (吴雪伟), were both reportedly beaten by police when they gathered with over a hundred other petitioners at Putuo District Court in Shanghai. They were supporting Xu Zhengqing, a petitioner who was facing trial in connection with his attempts to attend a memorial service in Beijing in January 2005. Along with dozens of other petitioners, the couple was detained by the police. Mao Hengfeng managed to escape and tried to continue her protest on behalf of Xu Zhengqing. However, she was detained again and sent back to her residential district, where local police and government officials apparently threatened her with imprisonment if she continued her protests and presented her with a formal police summons for investigation on suspicion of 'disturbing the normal lives of others'.

From 23 to 27 September 2005, Mao and her family were reportedly held under a form of house arrest after she stated that she would go to a United Nations representative office in Beijing to protest about the abuses. Seven police officers reportedly stood guard in front of her flat preventing her from leaving, even to go shopping.

On 29 September 2005 she was again placed under house arrest; an official told her that this would continue until the end of the fifth plenary session of the 16th Central Committee of the Chinese Communist Party on 11 October 2005. The following day, three police officers and seven Yangpu District Official Guards were stationed in front of her house. She was warned that she would be detained or face violent treatment if she tried to break out.

== Imprisonment (2006–2007) ==
In early 2006, Mao Hengfeng was detained in a roundup of petitioners before the anniversary of the 1989 Tiananmen Square protests and massacre and placed under residential surveillance. She was then charged with "violating the terms of residential surveillance," and placed her under "soft detention" in a small guesthouse room with six other men and women in Yangpu District, Shanghai. While under detention, Mao broke two table lamps in the guesthouse and was for that reason formally arrested on 30 June 2006 for "intentional destruction of property." She was sentenced to two-and-a-half years in prison on 12 January 2007 and imprisoned at Shanghai Women's Prison.

Mao and her husband, Wu Xuewei, filed an appeal against Mao's sentence. At the appeal hearing on 16 April 2007, the judge at Shanghai Municipal No. 2 Intermediate People's Court merely read a statement reaffirming Mao's sentence, allowing no evidence to be presented by Xu or Mao's lawyer. Mao was tormented and tortured by prisoners and staff alike while in prison. In addition to her regular abuse, she was placed under solitary confinement for 70 days, a violation of China's Prison Law, which allows a maximum of 15 days in solitary confinement. She was finally released on 29 November 2008, at the scheduled end of her sentence.

== Protest for Liu Xiaobo, and imprisonment (2009–2011) ==
On 25 December 2009, she was found guilty of "disturbing public order" due to her peaceful protest outside the Beijing municipal intermediate court, where she was campaigning in support of the human rights activist Liu Xiaobo. She was sent back to the RTL camp on 4 March 2010. There she was tortured and ill-treated. Abuses include force-feeding, blocking her access to food from her family and ordering other inmates to repeatedly beat her. Due to her protests about human rights in the RTL camp, on 9 September 2010, she was tied up for four days in the same position, without food or water. This was repeated on 29 September.

She was released on 22 February 2011. A CT scan showed that the ill-treatment had caused her to have bleeding in her brain. She was very quickly taken again, and is now believed to be in Shanghai City Prison Hospital, where she was previously tortured and ill-treated.

Recently, on 28 July 2011, Mao Hengfeng has been released again to her family in an unconscious state. Members of the police force are still currently keeping Mao Hengfeng under surveillance.

== Amnesty Campaign 2011 ==
Amnesty International have issued an Urgent Action, calling for her immediate release, an investigation into the abuse, and provision of independent medical assistance and assessment.
