= Shibalihe women's re-education through labor camp =

Labor camp in China

The Shibalihe women's re-education through labor camp was a Chinese facility where female dissidents sentenced to re-education through labor serve their sentences. It is located in Zhengzhou city in Henan Province. Shibalihe River is where Cheng Jianping (also known as Wang Yi) was sentenced in 2010 after her three word Tweet. Her phrase "Charge, angry youth!" although said to be sarcastic, was ruled an attempt to disrupt public order by the court.

== See also ==
- List of re-education through labor camps in China
