= Wanjia re-education through labor camp =

Labor camp in China

The Wanjia re-education through labor camp is a re-education through labor camp in the People's Republic of China in Heilongjiang province, Daoli District, Harbin City. According to the Laogai Research Foundation, the camp was established in 1984 and is controlled by the Harbin City Judicial Bureau. The camp reportedly also housed Falun Gong practitioners and includes a tailor's shop. In 1993, there were a total of 1,433 prisoners at Wanjia, Yuquan and Changlinzi RTL.

In 2001, the Hong Kong-based Information Center for Human Rights and Democracy said 10 women killed themselves to protest their treatment at the camp. A Chinese government spokesman in Beijing said that 14 followers had committed suicide at the camp and another 11 attempted suicide but were stopped by camp guards.

== See also ==
- List of re-education through labor camps in China
