= Daqing re-education through labor camp =

Labor camp in China

The Daqing re-education through labor camp is a re-education through labor camp located at 54 No. 22 Lane, Jingyi Street, Daqing, Heilongjiang Province, China.

According to a United Nations report on Civil and Political Rights, in 2002 an inmate at the camp, He Huajiang, who was assigned to three years’ re-education through labour for taking part in Falun Gong activities and disrupting public order, was reportedly tortured to death at the camp. According to reports, there were strangulation marks around his throat and other signs of torture. Mr. He's body was allegedly taken to a different location for cremation.

== See also ==
- List of re-education through labor camps in China
