= Cheng Jianping =

Chinese political dissident and human rights activist

Cheng Jianping 程建萍
- Born: 1963 or 1964
- Other name: Wang Yi
- Occupation: Human Rights Activist
- Known for: Being sentenced to re-education through labour after re-tweeting a Twitter post.

Cheng Jianping (Chinese: 程建萍; pinyin: Chéng Jiànpíng) also known as Wang Yi (Chinese: 王译) is a Chinese political dissident and human rights activist who was sentenced in November 2010, when she was 46 years old, to a year of re-education through labor after she posted comments to her Twitter account saying, "Charge, angry youth!"

== Twitter remark ==
The Twitter posting was made while China and Japan were involved in a diplomatic conflict over a group of islands in the East China Sea named Diaoyu (Chinese) or Senkaku (Japanese). Chinese protesters had been demonstrating against Japan, boycotting Japanese products and attacking Japanese-owned businesses to show their support for the Chinese government.

Cheng's post was actually a retweet of a post by her fiancé Hua Chunhui who originally wrote:

"Anti-Japanese demonstrations, smashing Japanese products, that was all done years ago by Guo Quan. So it's no new trick. If you really wanted to kick it up a notch, you'd immediately fly to Shanghai to smash the Japanese Expo pavilion."

Cheng then added her three-word comment, which both she and her fiance described as sarcastic satire, a joke criticizing the demonstrators.

== Arrest ==
The comments made on October 17, 2010 were seen by the Chinese government as "disrupting public order", interpreted as attempting to incite anti-Japanese protesters to attack Japan's pavilion at the Shanghai Expo.

Hua and Cheng were to be married on October 27, but before the ceremony, Cheng disappeared from the southeastern city of Wuxi. It was revealed the week of November 17 that she had been detained by police. Her fiance was also detained on October 27, and was released five days later.

Cheng was sentenced on November 12 to one year of re-education through labor at the Shibalihe River women's labour camp in Zhengzhou city in Henan Province.

== Imprisonment ==
Since the imprisonment Cheng has started a hunger strike protesting the sentence and seeking relocation closer to home. Her lawyer Lan Zhixue and her fiance have appealed the sentence. (Under China’s legal system, police can send people to re-education through labor for up to four years without trial. Few appeals are successful).

== International response ==
The Chinese government's response brought attention to the risks of using Twitter for controversial political issues, as well as criticism from human rights and open technology groups. “Sentencing someone to a year in a labor camp, without trial, for simply repeating another person’s clearly satirical observation on Twitter demonstrates the level of China’s repression of online expression,” said Sam Zarifi, Amnesty International’s Director for the Asia-Pacific. The organization further commented, "Cheng may be the first Chinese citizen to become a prisoner of conscience on the basis of a single tweet." Twitter CEO Dick Costolo posted to his Twitter account, "Dear Chinese Government, year-long detentions for sending a sarcastic tweet are neither the way forward nor the future of your great people."

Twitter is currently banned in China, but many people circumvent internet controls to use it.

== Support for other activists ==
Amnesty International said Cheng had participated in low-level online activism, including sending online messages in support of jailed Nobel Peace Prize Laureate Liu Xiaobo. According to her fiance, Cheng's prior activism included signing petitions including one calling for the release of Liu Xiaobo.

Cheng had also been detained by police for five days in August 2010 after voicing support for Liu Xianbin, a long-time democracy activist dating back to the protests that preceded the Tiananmen Square massacre in 1989. Liu Xianbin had been detained in 2010, suspected of inciting subversion of state power for criticizing China's Communist Party.

Cheng had also raised support for Zhao Lianhai, a former food safety worker who became an activist for parents of children harmed during the 2008 Chinese milk scandal.

Chinese Human Rights Defenders described Cheng as an active participant in Weiquan tactics, bringing attention to government abuses by identifying officials by name, and putting pressure on them through protests and phone calls.
