= Laogai Museum =

Museum in Washington, D.C.

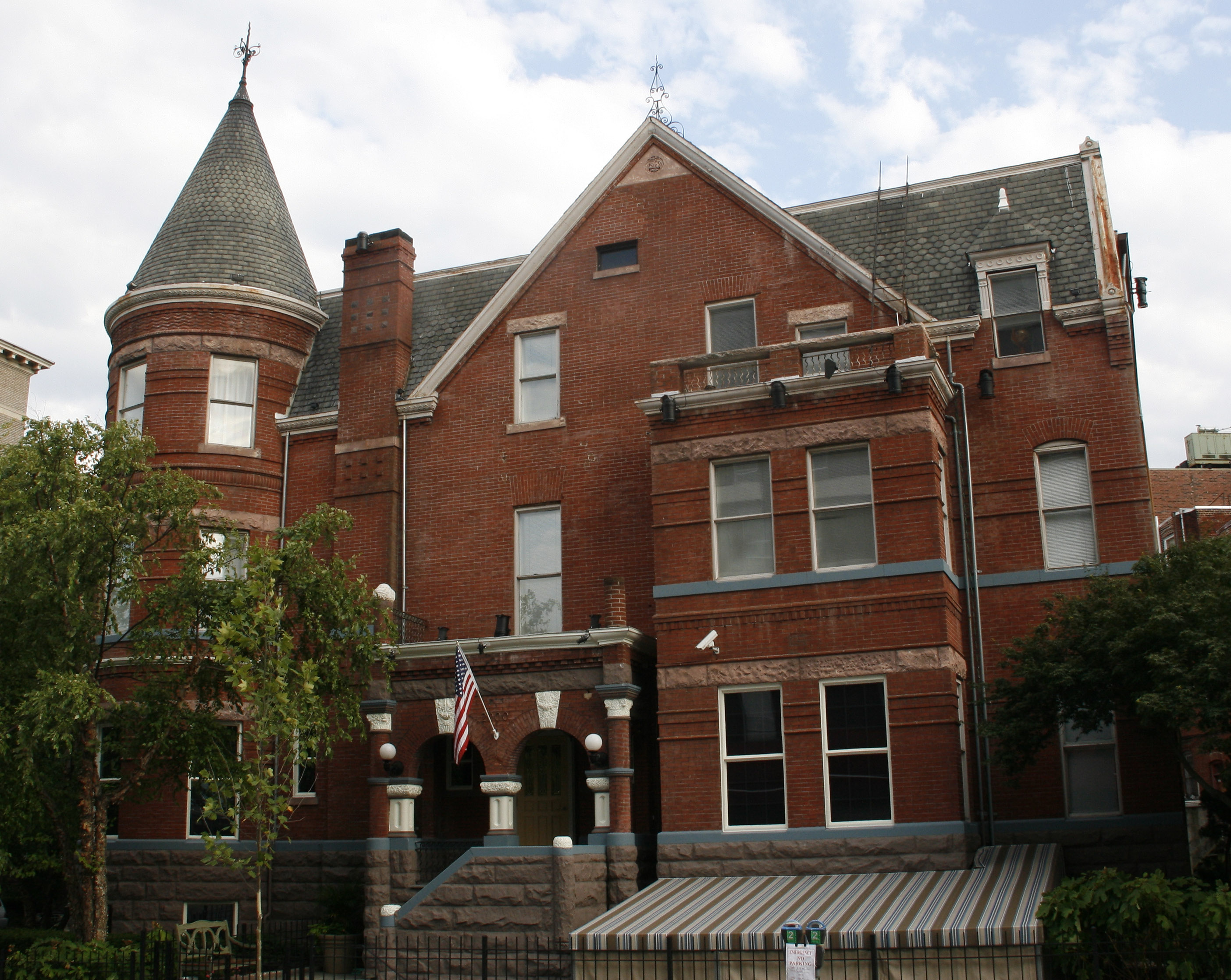
- Former residence that was home to the Laogai Museum

- Location within Washington, D.C.
- Established: November 12, 2008
- Dissolved: March 2020
- Location: 1901 18th Street NW; Washington, D.C. (formerly 1734 20th St. NW, Washington D.C., United States; initially at 1109 M Street NW, Washington, D.C).
- Coordinates: 38.9067°N 77.0276°W
- Type: Prison museum
- Public transit access: Dupont Circle
- Website: laogairesearch.org

The Laogai Museum was a museum in Dupont Circle, Washington, D.C., United States, which showcased human rights in the People's Republic of China, focusing particularly on Láogǎi, the Chinese prison system of "Reform through Labor". The creation of the museum was spearheaded by Harry Wu, a well-known Chinese dissident who himself served 19 years in laogai prisons; it was supported by the Yahoo! Human Rights Fund. It opened to the public on 12 November 2008, and Wu's non-profit research organization (the Laogai Research Foundation) calls it the first museum in the United States to directly address the issue of human rights in China. It is now permanently closed.

== Overview ==
The Chinese penal system includes numerous components such as prisons (formerly referred to as laogai), re-education through labor or laojiao camps, ankang mental health facilities, and juvenile detention centers. The Laogai Museum focused mainly on the laogai component, which Wu's non-profit research organization calls "the most extensive system of forced labor camps in the world.". Prisoners in these camps are said to undergo forced labor and thought reform, and the system has attracted widespread criticism from the international community. In 1994, the government abandoned the term laogai and renamed the facilities "prisons" (jianyu), but the Laogai Research Foundation and others claim that forced labor continues and prison conditions have not improved.

The purpose of the Laogai Museum, according to Wu, was both to educate the public about the laogai and to memorialize the victims of the laogai. The museum documented the "history and structure of the laogai," and displayed laogai-related materials such as uniforms, photographs, government documents, and products manufactured by prisoners—including such items as Christmas lights, tea bags, and plastic flowers; many of the items were donated by laogai survivors, and others come from Wu's own archives. The museum also had a large archive of prison-made products, victims' testimonies, and Chinese government documents.

The museum appeared to have closed in early 2017 following the death of its founder in April 2016, who had been criticised for excessive spending on the museum, rather than on human rights activists themselves. The museum reopened in October 2018. It closed in March 2020 with the onset of the COVID-19 pandemic lockdown, and did not reopen, but it maintained an online presence via the Laogai Research Foundation.

== Funding ==
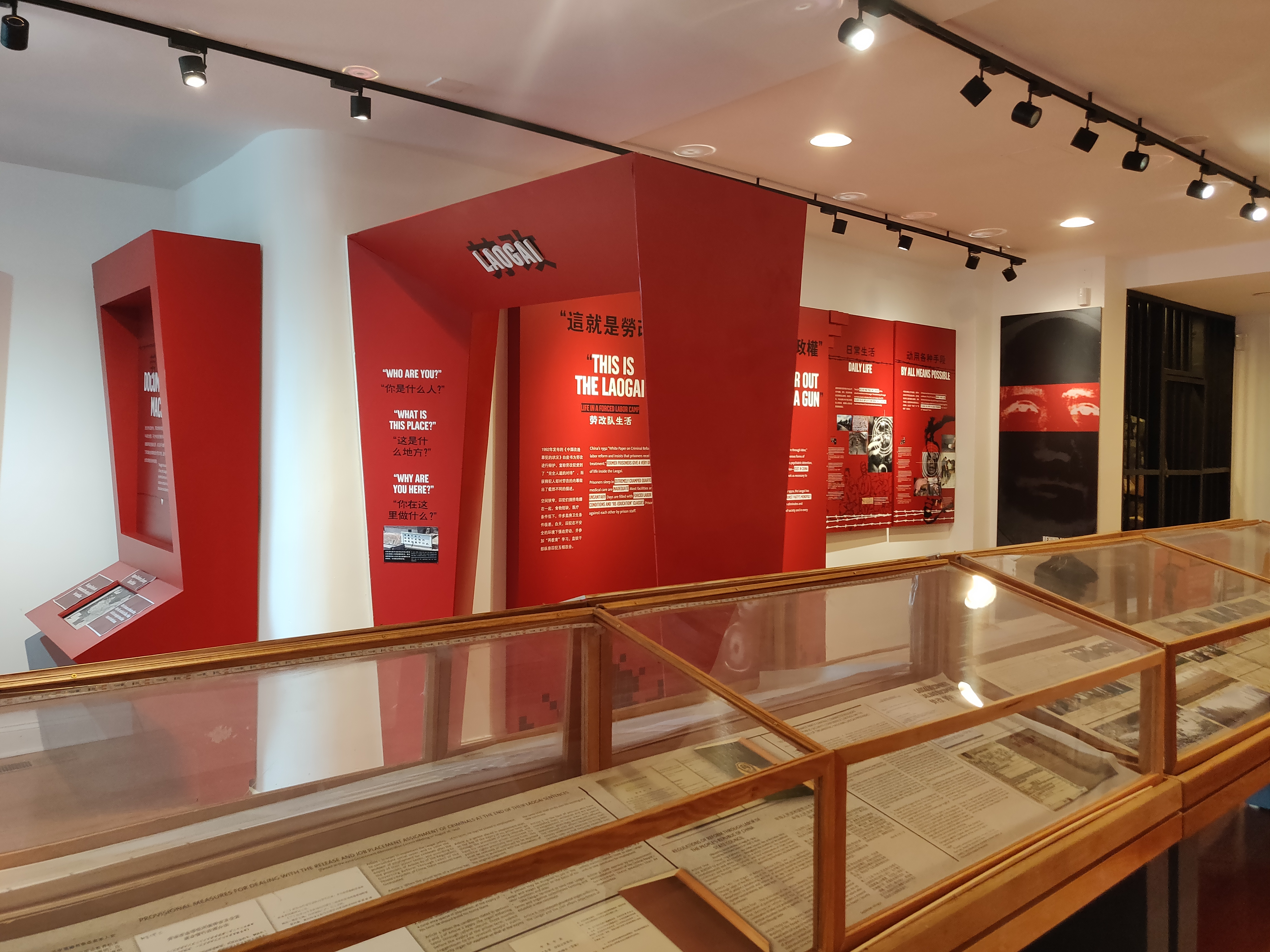
Interior of the museum

The museum was funded in part by the Yahoo! Human Rights Fund, a fund established by Yahoo! after the company attracted criticism for helping Chinese police locate and detain internet dissidents. The fund, headed by Yahoo! co-founder Jerry Yang was part of Yahoo!'s apology, and funding the museum was one of its first public projects.

== Criticism ==
A spokesman for the Chinese embassy criticized the museum, calling it an attack on China's reputation and suggesting that Wu's motivation behind opening the museum was "to vilify the Chinese legal system and mislead the American public." In response, Wu said that the Chinese authorities "always dismiss me as a morally corrupt and dangerous criminal. Their second argument is that criminals have to work in some American prisons, too. But I can tell you that it's not the same thing at all."
