= List of re-education through labor camps in China =

Re-education through labor (RTL; in Chinese, laodong jiaoyang 劳动教养, abbreviated láojiào 劳教) is a system of administrative detentions in the People's Republic of China. The estimated number of detainees in re-education through labor camps is anywhere from 300,000 to 2 million. According to Amnesty international in 2021 up to 2 million, Baptist press estimates more than 3 million are subject to re-education through labor. There are at least 310 camps in China.

== Anhui province ==
Name	Enterprise name	City/County/District	Village/Town	Established	Notes
Anqing RTL	Anqing Xinsheng Kiln Works	Anqing City			
Baofeng RTL	Baofeng General Industrial Company	Xuanzhou City			
Hefei City RTL		Hefei City	Yicheng Town	1983	Moved in 2003. Capacity of 600 inmates.
Huaibei RTL		Huainan City			Formerly called Huainan City Independent LRC; adopted current name in 1989
Provincial No. 2 RTL	Shangzhangwei Farm	Hefei City		1983	Capacity of 600 inmates.
Provincial RTL for Drug Rehabilitation		Unknown			

== Beijing municipality ==
Name	Enterprise name	City/County/District	Village/Town	Established	Notes
Beijing Municipal RTL Transfer Facility		Daxing District			Facility for "implementing" decisions of RTL committees (sorting detainees and transferring them to appropriate facilities or releasing them)
Beijing Tiantanghe RTL		Daxing District		1960	Facility mainly for medical treatment and "re-education" of sick female detainees. Originally called Tiantanghe Farm.
Beijing Women's RTL	Tiantanghe Farm	Daxing County		1960	
Beijing Xin'an RTL		Daxing District	5 km south of Huangcun Town	1980	Most inmates are either female, or male drug offenders.
Beijing Xinhe RTL, also called Tuanhe RTL		Daxing District		1955	Formerly named Tuanhe Farm. Called Tuanhe RTL in 2007–2008 Laogai Handbook
Shuanghe RTL		Gannan County, western Heilongjiang Province		1968	Prisoners are from Beijing.

== Chongqing municipality ==
Name	Enterprise name	City/County/District	Village/Town	Established	Notes
Chongqing RTL	Xinsheng Horticultural Farm	Jiangbei District	21-1 Wujiang Road		Also called Maojiashan Women's RTL and Jiangbei RTL
Chongqing Women's RTL No. 2		Nan'an District	Changshengqiao Town		
Fuling RTL		Fuling District			
Xishanping RTL	Xishanping Farm	Beibei District	Dongyang Town		"Reported to hold Falun Gong followers,"

== Fujian province ==
Name	Enterprise name	City/County/District	Village/Town	Established	Notes
Fuzhou RTL	Processing plant; Lifting equipment plant; Garment factories; Fire machinery plant; Fire services security technologies	Fuzhou City	Qianqi Road		
Fuzhou Rujiang RTL	Fuzhou Rujiang Clothing, Footwear, and Hat Factory	Fuzhou City	47 Kuai'an Road	1980	Also called Rujiang Forced Drug Abstinence RTL
Longyan RTL	Longyan Farm	Longyan City	Longmenkou		
Nanping RTL	Nanping Xingguang Sodium Silicate Factory; Nanping Xingguang Aluminum Product Decoration Plant	Nanping City	3 Jinfeng Road		
Provincial Juvenile RTL		Fuzhou City		Sept. 2003	Inmates 18 years old or younger
Provincial Women's RTL	Fuzhou Yanshan Clothing Factory; Fuzhou Yanshan Handicraft Plant	Jin'an District, Fuzhou City	236 Qianheng Road		
Longyan RTL	Longyan Farm	Longyan City	Longmenkou		
Quanzhou RTL	Quanzhou No. 7 Plastics	Fengze District, Quanzhou City	Puren Beimenwai	1986	
Sanming RTL	Sanming Xinsheng Plant	Sanming City			
Xiamen RTL		Xiamen City	Jiangtou Garden		
Zhangzhou Forced Drug Abstinence RTL				1997	
Zhangzhou RTL	Zhangzhou Xinxing Plastics Plant	Zhangzhou City	Shixia District	1987	

== Gansu province ==
Name	Enterprise name	City/County/District	Village/Town	Established	Notes
Provincial No. 1 RTL		Lanzhou City			Also called Lanzhou City Ping'antai RTL
Provincial No. 2 RTL		Anning District, Lanzhou City	Beibinhe West Road	1991	Housed 2,000 detainees in 2003
Provincial No. 3 RTL		Zhangye City			
Heshui County RTL		Heshui County, Qingyang City			

== Guangdong province ==
Name	Enterprise name	City/County/District	Village/Town	Established	Notes
Cencun RTL	Guangzhou City Dongsheng Mine Works	Tianhe District, Guangzhou City	Cencun, Wushan	1984	
Chatou RTL	Guangzhou Yuqing handicraft plant; previously Chatou Farm	Baiyun District, Guangzhou City	Chatou Island, Shijing Town	1986	
Chatou Women's RTL		Baiyun District, Guangzhou City	Chatou		
Dongkeng RTL	Guangzhou City Dongkeng Stone Mine	Guangzhou City	Dongkeng, Tonghe	July 1982	
Foshan RTL		Foshan City	7 Laixiang Road, Shiwan Town		Had over 2,000 detainees in 2001
Guangzhou No. 1 RTL	Chini Stone Quarry	Huadu District	Hexi Village, Chini Town		Also called Huadu Chini RTL
Guangzhou No. 2 RTL	Stone Mine	Huadu District	Buxi Village, Tanbu Town	May 1974	Moved to present location in June 2002
Guangzhou No. 3 RTL	Guangzhou Chini Cement Factory	Huadu District	Gangmeitou, Hengsha Village, Chini Town		
Hengshanguo RTL		Sanshui District, Foshan City			
Huizhou Municipal RTL		Huizhou City	Huicheng District, Sandong Town		
Jiangmen RTL		Jiangmen City	southwest corner	May 1982	Designated an RTL in February 1986
Meizhou RTL		Meizhou City	Meijiang District	1983	Moved outside the city in 1985
Municipal Juvenile RTL		Guangzhou	Baiyun District		
Municipal RTL for Drug Users		Guangdong	Baiyun District		
Provincial Juvenile RTL					
Provincial No. 2 RTL for Drug Users		Unknown			
Provincial RTL for Drug Offenders					Official became an RTL specifically for drug offenders in July 1995
Sanshui RTL	Hengshengwo Farm; Sanshui Farm	Sanshui County	3 kilometers east of Huangtang	1955	RTL for women
Shanwei Municipal RTL		Shanwei City, Lufeng District	Beiyang Town	March 2003	Construction began in 1999, but didn't accept inmates until 2003
Shenzhen No. 1 RTL		Luohu District, Shenzhen City	North Jinbi Road, Shangbu	1981	
Shenzhen No. 2 RTL		Shenzhen City			Also called Longhuazhen RTL
Tan'gang RTL	Tan'gang Fire Hose Factory; Construction Materials Factory	Guangzhou City	Xingcha Road, Tan'gang, Chatou		
Yingde RTL	Makou Farm	Yingde County	Makou		
Zengcheng RTL		Zengcheng City		1950	Originally called Labu RTL. First RTL established in Guangdong. Capacity of 3,500.
Zhongshan RTL		Zhongshan City	Dahuantang, Maling	1993	Didn't have any detainees until 1997
Zhuhai Municipal RTL		Zhuhai City		Oct 2003	
Dongjing RTL		Jieyang City			

== Guangxi province ==
Name	Enterprise name	City/County/District	Village/Town	Established	Notes
Autonomous Region No. 1 RTL		Nanning City	8 Xi'an Road		
Autonomous Region No. 2 RTL		Western suburb of Liuzhou City			1300 detainees as of June 2003
Autonomous Region No. 4 RTL		Guilin City			
Autonomous Region No. 5 RTL		Outskirts of Guilin City			
Guangxi No. 2 Drug Rehabilitation RTL		Beihai City	North-South Highway	2003	
Guangxi Women's RTL		Yongning County, Nanning City	Jingji Zoulang Development District #40, Yudong Dadao Road		Has female Falun Gong practitioners, according to 2007–2008 Laogai Handbook. Formerly known as Guangxi No.1 RTL
Liuzhou RTL	Xinxing Farm	Liuzhou City		1951	Over 130,000 mu in area.

== Guizhou province ==
Name	Enterprise name	City/County/District	Village/Town	Established	Notes
Anshun RTL		Anshun City			
Anshun Juvenile RTL				2003	
Bijie District RTL		Bijie District	Zhujiawan		
Fuquan RTL	Fuquan Phosphate Fertilizer Plant	Fuquan City, Qiannanzhou	Longchang Town	1965	
Guizhou Province Women's RTL		Qingzhen City		26 June 1997	
Huagong RTL	Huagong Farm	Unknown			Moved in 2003 from Qinglong County to an unknown location.
Qiandong Rehabilitation RTL		Unknown			
Sanjiang RTL	Sanjiang Farm	Guiyang City			As of May 2004, had over 2000 detainees, over half of whom were drug offenders.
Zhongba RTL	Zhongba Farm, Zhuhai Chili Electronic, Ltd.	Qingzhen City			
Zunyi RTL	Zunyi Brickyard	Zunyi City			
Zunyi Rehabilitation RTL		Unknown		1999	RTL for repeat drug offenders

== Hainan ==
Name	Enterprise name	City/County/District	Village/Town	Established	Notes
Provincial No. 1 RTL		Qiongshan	Mailbox #66, Xindazhou Road		
Provincial No. 2 RTL		Haikou City		1989	Also called Hainan Province Women's Drug Rehabilitation Center.
Provincial No. 3 RTL		Sanya City			Also called Hainan Provincial Drug Rehabilitation RTL.

== Hebei province ==
Name	Enterprise name	City/County/District	Village/Town	Established	Notes
Balizhuang RTL		Baoding City	1995 Lianchi Street		
Baoding RTL	Baoding RTL Printing Shop	Baoding City	Zhi'nong Road		
Chengde RTL		Chengde City			
Handan RTL		Handan City	Mailbox 5	1985	
Hebei Women's RTL		Luquan	Tongye Town, southwest of Xiliangxiang Village	under construction as of 2008	Planned to hold 1500 detainees
Kaiping RTL	Xinsheng Fireproof Materials Plant	Kaiping District, Tangshan City	Number 27 Brickfield		Also called Provincial No. 1 RTL
Qinhuangdao RTL	Shanhaiguan Machine Plant	Shanhaiguan District, Qinhuangdao City	Xuanyangdong Road		
Shijiazhuang RTL	Zhenhua Porcelain Enamel Factory; Shijiazhuang City Xinsheng Shoe Manufacturer	Shijiazhuang City	22 Beijiao Street		
Shijiazhuang Women's RTL		Shijiazhuang City	8 South Gaoji Road, Zhaolingpu		
Tangshan RTL		Lu'nan District, Tangshan City	35 Hehuakeng Road		Also called Hehuakeng RTL
Wanzhuang RTL		Langfang City			
Xingtai RTL		Xingtai City			
Zhangjiakou RTL		Zhangjiaokou City			

== Heilongjiang province ==
Name	Enterprise name	City/County/District	Village/Town	Established	Notes
Changlinzi RTL		Daowai District, Harbin City	Tuanjie Town		
Daqing RTL		Daqing City	54 No. 22 Lane, Jingyi Street		Began holding Falun Gong detainees in 1999
Fularji RTL		Fularji, Qiqihar			Also spelled Fulaerji or Fula'erji
Jixi RTL		Jixi City	Daodong Station		
Hegang RTL		Hegang City			
Huayuan RTL	Frozen sucker plant; Repair shop; Brickyard	Harbin City			
Jixi RTL		Jixi City	Daodong Station		
Mudanjiang RTL		Mudanjiang City			
Provincial RTL		Taiping District, Harbin City	239 Xianfeng Road		
Qianjin RTL		Harbin City			
Qiqihar RTL		Qiqihar City		October 2003	Formerly Qiqihar Shuanghe RTL and Fuyu RTL, combined in October 2003. According to 2007–2008 Laogai Handbook, has housed over 200 Falun Gong detainees and has conducted "brainwashing."
Shuangyashan RTL	Xinsheng Coal Mine	Shuangyashan City		1974	
Suihua RTL	Xinglong Automobile Repair and Supply Plant; Brickyard	Suihua District	North Zhongzhi Road		
Tielu RTL		Qiqihar City	385 Longhua Road		Takes care of Harbin railways; is the only railway RTL in China
Wanjia RTL		Daoli District, Harbin City	Xinnong Village	1984	Houses Falun Gong detainees, according to 2007–2008 Laogai Handbook
Yichun RTL	Cuiluan Forestry Center	Yichun City			
Yimianpo RTL		Shangzhi City			
Yong'an RTL	Longwei Plastic Goods Factory	Wangkui County, Suihua City			
Yuquan RTL		Harbin City		1984	

== Henan province ==
Name	Enterprise name	City/County/District	Village/Town	Established	Notes
Anyang RTL	Longquan Farm	Anyang City			
Baimiao RTL	Tongyong Electric Control Plant; Zhengzhou Gerui Gas Automatic Fire Fighting Plant	Zhengzhou City	62 Wenhua road		Originally a "Labor Reform Detachment," became an RTL in the 1980s
Haobi RTL		Haobi City		1979	
Huangheqiao RTL		Luoyang City		1981	Held "many religious prisoners" in 1983
Jiaozuo RTL		Jiaozuo City		1979	
Kaifeng RTL		Kaifeng City			
Leihe RTL		Leihe City			
Luoyang RTL	Chunhui Crane Factory	Luoyang City	Wugu Road	1979	
Nanyang RTL	Pushan Stone Quarry	Nanyang City			
Pingdingshan RTL		Pingdingshan City		December 1986	Merger of Bailou RTL and Yaomeng RTL
Provincial No. 1 RTL		Zhengzhou City			
Provincial No. 2 RTL	Xinhe Farm; Henan Ruyang Cast Stone Factory; Henan Ruyang Rock Wool Fiber Factory	Ruyang County, Luoyang City	Da'an Village (1 kilometer west)	1952	
Provincial No. 3 RTL	Baitiaohe Farm	Suburbs of Xuchang City	Near Bayi plant		Also called Xuchang RTL
Puyang RTL		Puyang City		1985	
Qiliyan RTL	Zhengzhou Jinhua Abrasive Factory; Zhengzhou Jinhua Abrasive Factory Printing and Binding Subsidiary Factory	Zhengzhou City			
Sanmenxia RTL		Sanmenxia City			
Shangqiu RTL		Shangqiu City			
Shibalihe Women's RTL		Guancheng District, Zhengzhou City	Shibalihe Town		Also called Provincial No. 1 Women's RTL
Shifo RTL	Zhengzhou Zhongyuan General Hoisting Machinery Factory	Zhengzhou City			
Xinxiang RTL		Xinxiang City			
Xinyang RTL	Xinyang RTL Plastic Bag Factory	Xinyang City		1981	

== Hubei province ==
Name	Enterprise name	City/County/District	Village/Town	Established	Notes
Baiquan RTL		Wuhan City			
Denglin RTL	Denglin Farm	Xiangbei County		1990	Originally called Xiangbei RTL
Guanbuqiao RTL		Xianyang City			
Haiyang RTL		Hanyang District, Wuhan City	Xin'nong Street		
Hannan RTL		Hannan District, Wuhan City	Huangjiadun		
Hewan RTL		Hankou District, Wuhan City	Luojiazui, Gushaoshu		Also called Hubei Provincial RTL. According to 2007&2008 Laogai Handbook, work goes on from 6am to 2am (20 hours a day)
Huangshi RTL	Huangshi Electromagnetic Wire Plant	Huangshi County		1980	
Hubei Women's RTL		Wuchang District, Wuhan City	Hongshan District	January 2005	Formerly called Shayang Qilihu Women's RTL
Mianhudun RTL		Dongxihu District, Wuhan City	Wuzhigou	1980s	
Shashi RTL		Shashi City		1983	
Shayang RTL	Shayang Farm	Zhongxiang City	Qilihu Town		Also called Qilihu RTL and Hanyang RTL
Shiyan RTL		Shiyan County		1985	
Shizishan RTL		Wuhan City			Held male and female Falun Gong detainees, according to 2007–2008 Laogai Handbook
Xiangfan RTL		Xiangfan City			
Yichang RTL		Yichang City			

== Hunan province ==
Name	Enterprise name	City/County/District	Village/Town	Established	Notes
Bainihu RTL		Xiangyin County	Gaolin Xincheng Development District	1972	Only RTL farm in Hunan
Baimalong Women's RTL		Zhuzhou City	Baimalong, Baifeng	1958	Only women's RTL in Hunan
Changde RTL	Changde City Xinsheng Switchgear Plant	Changde City	Jubaocun, Wuling District	1983	Receives both local RTL inmates, and drug offenders from neighboring areas
Changqiao RTL	Changqiao Horticultural Farm	Changsha City	Across from Changsha Police School (Changsha Yuanda Road)	1963	Formerly located at Changqiao, Changsha City. Since establishment, has held over 40,000 detainees.
Changsha City Drug Rehabilitation RTL		Changsha City	Yuanda Road		
Changsha Women's RTL	Hunan Silk Mill	Changsha City	6 Dongfeng Roa	1950	
Chenzhou RTL		Chenzhou City	7 Shiliuwan	1981	
Hengyang RTL		Hengyang City	Huaxin Development District		Construction began in 1950.
Huaihua RTL		Huaihua City	Xichong Village		Construction began in 1981.
Hunan Juvenile Offender Detachment		Yuhua District, Changsha City	North Tiyuan Road	September 2003	Only RTL in Hunan with juvenile detainees
Loudi RTL		Louxing District, Loudi City	11 Groups Xiaoke Residence Committee Dake Office	December 1983	
Pingtang RTL	Hunan Provincial Xinsheng Cement Factory	Hexi District, Changsha City	Pingtang Town	1979	Prisoners are drug offenders, those who have escaped from other RTLs, or those who have been labelled "difficult."
Shaoyang RTL		Shaoyang City	Chengdong Guanyin Tang		
Xiangtan RTL	Xiangtan Jianshe Farm	Xiangtan City	Jiuhua Economic District	1972	
Xinkaipu RTL	Hunan Switch Factory	Changsha City	174 Xinkaipu Road, Jincha	1952	
Yiyang RTL		Yiyang City suburbs	Yangshu Village, Changchun Town	1983	
Yongzhou RTL		Yongzhou City	Near Yonglian Highway		
Yueyang RTL		Linxiang City, west suburbs	Sanjiaoping	1984	Originally called Junshan Farm
Xiangxi Prefecture RTL		Jishou City	Yaxi Village, Yangjiaping	November 1981	
Zhuzhou RTL		Hetang District, Zhuzhou City	Songjia Qiaoyou Pu'ao	November 1983	

== Inner Mongolia ==
Name	Enterprise name	City/County/District	Village/Town	Established	Notes
Baotou RTL		Baotou City	Xishuiquan		
Chifeng City RTL		Chifeng City	Qiaoxidajie Street	1958	
Hailar RTL		Hailar District, Hulun Buir City	Jindun Road	1955	
Hohhot Women's RTL		South Harbin City	Shuaijia Yingzijie Village, Xiaoheihe District Government	1995	Also called Inner Mongolia RTL
Tumuji RTL	Pasture	Hinggan League	Jalaid Banner		
Wuhai RTL	Calcium Carbide Plant	Wuhai City	21 kilometers from Hai District		
Wuyuan RTL	Dongtucheng Farm	Wuyuan County, Byannur League			Originally called Dongtucheng RTL, adopted present name in 2001
Xi League RTL	Carton plant; Milk cow breeding	Xilin Gol League			Bilingual in Mandarin and Mongolian; only bilingual RTL in Inner Mongolia

== Jiangsu province ==
Name	Enterprise name	City/County/District	Village/Town	Established	Notes
Donghai RTL		Donghai County		1987	Established in 1958 as a labor reform detachment, later became a laogai camp; current RTL center established in 1987
Fangqiang RTL	Fangqiang Farm	Yancheng City	Dafeng	1951	
Judong RTL		Jurong City		1979	Established in 1958 as a labor reform detachment and juvenile offender detachment; became an RTL in 1979, adopted current name in 1986
Nanjing Dalianshan RTL	Dalianshan Cement Factory	Jiangning District, Nanjing City	Dalianshan, Chunhua Town	1958	
Provincial Women's RTL		Jurong City		Jan. 2003	
Taihu RTL	Jiangsu Provincial Taihu Quarry Companies	Wuxi City		1980	Established in 1959 as a labor reform detachment; became an RTL in 1980. Provincial government decided in 2008 to close this RTL, and the process of closing it is underway.
Wuxi RTL		Wuxi City		Dec. 2004	
Yangmeitang RTL		Nanjing City			Holds female and juvenile detainees.

== Jiangxi province ==
Name	Enterprise name	City/County/District	Village/Town	Established	Notes
Jiujiang RTL	Saihu Farm	Ruichang County, Jiujiang City	Majialong Saihu	1951	Also called Majialong RTL. Closed in 1968, and reopened in 1984.
Nanchang RTL		Nanchang City	Maiyuan Road		
Nanchang RTL for Drug Offenders		Nanchang City	Caojiaqiao	1996	Moved to present address in 2007
Provincial Juvenile RTL		Nanchang City	Jianxin County	1956	Originally established in Yichun City, moved to outskirts of Nanchang City in 1987. Changed name to Jiangxi Provincial Juvenile Offender Detachment in 2003.
Provincial No. 1 RTL	Yongqiao Farm	Jinxian County		1956	
Provincial No. 2 RTL		Gao'an City	Bajing Town		Also called Gao'an RTL

== Jilin province ==
Name	Enterprise name	City/County/District	Village/Town	Established	Notes
Baicheng District RTL		Baicheng			
Baicheng RTL	Baicheng City RTL Labor Services Company	Baicheng			
Baishan RTL	Chemical material plant	Baishan			
Beijiao RTL		Changchun City		1984	
Chaoyanggou RTL	Dongfang Petrochemical Factory	Changchun City	Chaoyanggou	1982	
Fenjin RTL	Piano parts factory	Kuancheng District, Changchun City	Caijiacun, Fenjinxiang	1975	Originally Diaojiashan RTL. Moved to current name and location in 1997.
Hunjiang RTL		Hunjiang			
Jilin City RTL		Jilin City			
Jilin RTL		Jilin City		1984	
Jiutai RTL		Changchun City		1984–5	Also called Jiutai Yinmahe RTL
Liaoyuan RTL		Dongliao County, Liaoyuan	Baiquan Town	1985	Also called Baiquan RTL
Mudanjiang RTL		Mudanjiang City		1981	Also called Sidao RTL
Provincial Women's RTL		Changchun City	Heijuzi	1981	Also called Heijuzi RTL
Siping RTL		Siping City		1984	
Tonghua RTL	Tonghua RTL Wangou Steel Factory	Tonghua	150 Yuquan Rd.		
Weizigou RTL		Changchun City	Weizigou Village, Xinlongshan Town	1989	
Yanji RTL		Yanji			
Yanbian Autonomous Prefecture RTL		Yanji	Beiqing Road	1984	

== Liaoning province ==
Name	Enterprise name	City/County/District	Village/Town	Established	Notes
Anshan RTL		Wuqianshan District, Anshan City	Yuemingshan, Qianyuxiang	1979	
Benxi RTL		Benxi			
Chaoyang RTL	Xinsheng Asbestos Mine	Chaoyang County	Taizi Village		
Dalian RTL		Ganjingzi District, Dalian	175 Nanlin St.	May 1980	
Fushun RTL		Fushun		Early 1990s	
Fuxin RTL		Fuxin		1980	
Jinzhou RTL		Jinzhou			
Masanjia RTL	Masanjia Xinsheng Farm	Shenyang		1957	Considered one of the largest centers of Falun Gong detainees in China
Qinhuangdao RTL		Qinhuangdao			
Shenyang RTL		Shenyang			Includes Yijia RTL, Zhangshi RTL, Wangjiazhuang RTL and Longshan RTL
Tieling RTL		Tieling			
Huludao City Correctional Camp					Inmate Zhang Bin's death in April 2003 sparked widespread calls to reform the re-education through labor system

== Ningxia region ==
Name	Enterprise name	City/County/District	Village/Town	Established	Notes
Autonomous Region RTL		Wuzhong City			Formerly called Lingwu Baitugangzi RTL
Shizuishan RTL		Shizuishan			
Xincheng RTL		Yinchuan			

== Qinghai province ==
Name	Enterprise name	City/County/District	Village/Town	Established	Notes
Duoba RTL	Nantan Farm	Huangzhong County, Xining || Duoba Town || May 1983 || Also called Provincial Men's RTL and Qinghai Province No. 1 RTL			
Ge'ermu RTL		Unknown		Nov 2000	
Qinghai Women's RTL		Xining	62 Bayi East Rd.	Nov 2000	

== Shaanxi province ==
Name	Enterprise name	City/County/District	Village/Town	Established	Notes
Hanzhong RTL		Hantai District, Hanzhong	Shangshuidu Village		
Jinhe RTL		Baoji	Baoping Rd.	1971	Renamed as an RTL in 1982
Luyang RTL	Brick factory	Fuping County	Zhangqiao Town	1982	
Provincial Women's RTL		Xi'an City	6 Beixuanwu Rd., Fangxincun		
Xinzhou RTL		Unknown		Early 1950s	Also classified as an ankang (asylum)
Yan'an RTL	Machine brickyard	Yan'an	Chengzigou Liulin village		
Yulin RTL		Yulin City			
Zaozihe RTL		Fengxiang County, Baoji	Dongjiahe Town		

== Shandong province ==
Name	Enterprise name	City/County/District	Village/Town	Established	Notes
Handan RTL	Xinsheng Machine Factory	Handan City			
Ji'nan RTL	Ji'nan City Yujin Building Equipment Factory	Ji'nan City	24 Liuchangshan Rd.		Also called Liuchangshan RTL. Reported to hold Falun Gong practitioners.
Ji'ning RTL	Ji'ning City 80 Motor Repair Shop	Ji'ning City			
Provincial No. 1 RTL	Shandong Shengjian 83 Factory	Zhoucun District, Zibo	Southwest of Wangcun Town	1958	Also called Shandong Shengjian Basan RTL. Designated as "open to the public" in February 1982. Reported to mine clay for export to Japan.
Provincial No. 1 Women's RTL		Jinan	20 Jiangshuiquan Rd.		Also called Jiangshuiquan RTL; adopted present name in 2001. Reported to hold Falun Gong practitioners.
Provincial No. 2 RTL		Zhoucun, Zibo	Basan Factory, Wangcun Town		Reported to hold Falun Gong practitioners.
Provincial No. 2 Women's RTL		Zhoucun, Zibo	Wangcun Town	Nov 2003	Reported to hold Falun Gong practitioners.
Shandong Provincial RTL		Wangcun District, Zibo			Also called Shandong Provincial Zibo Wangcun RTL; its four branches are Provincial No. 1 RTL, Provincial No. 1 Women's RTL, Provincial No. 2 RTL, and Provincial No. 2 Women's RTL
Qingdao RTL	Longyuan Steel Pipe Works; Qingdao Auto Damper Work	Licang District, Qingdao	2 Shangyuan Rd.		Reported to hold Falun Gong practitioners.
Weifang RTL	Weifang Jinfan Chemical Plant; Weifang Changle Rock Material Plant	Weifang City			Also called Changle RTL. Reported to hold Falun Gong practitioners; has a production contract with a Chinese/American business.
Zaozhuang RTL	Zaozhuang Shengjian Coal Mine	Zaozhuang		1984	
Zibo RTL	Boshan Tool Factory	Boshan District, Zibo	Qiugucun	Jan 1981	

== Shanghai municipality ==
Name	Enterprise name	City/County/District	Village/Town	Established	Notes
Shanghai Juvenile RTL		Qingpu District		1997	
Shanghai No. 1 RTL	Shanghai Farm	Dafeng City, Jiangsu Province	Sichahe		Became an RTL in 1981.
Shanghai No. 2 RTL	Shanghai Chuandong Farm	Dongtai City, Jiangsu Province		1950s	
Shanghai No. 3 RTL	Qingdong Farm	Qingpu District	Tianshengzhuang	Jan 1959	Also called Qingpu RTL
Shanghai Municipal Women's RTL		Qingpu District, Shanghai	Tianshengzhuang		
Shanghai RTL Receiving Center					

== Shanxi province ==
Name	Enterprise name	City/County/District	Village/Town	Established	Notes
Changzhi RTL	Daxinzhuang Farm	Changzhi			Became an RTL in 1988.
Datong City RTL	Datong City RTL Coal Mine	Datong		1981	Also called Heiliushui RTL, Luozhenying RTL
Provincial RTL	Taiyuan Xinxin Industrial Corporation	Xinghualing District, Taiyuan	5 Xindian Street		Also called Xindian Men's RTL
Provincial RTL for Drug Offenders					
Provincial Women's RTL		Taiyuan	Xindian		Also called Taiyuan Xiandan RTL
Taiyuan City RTL	Taiyuan RTL Gujiao Center for Coking	Jiancaoping District, Taiyuan	North of Zhencheng Village, Baibanxiang	1984	
Yangquan RTL		Pingding County		December 1984	
Yongji Dongcun RTL	Dongcun Farm	Yongji		1955	
Yuxiang RTL		Yongji			Became an RTL in 1979.

== Sichuan province ==
Name	Enterprise name	City/County/District	Village/Town	Established	Notes
Dayan RTL	XX Brickyard	Ziyang City			
Panzhihua RTL		Renhe District, Panzhihua City	Shagou		
Provincial Women's RTL	Longquanyi District Luodai Wen'an Town Tianqin Clothing Factory	Zizhong County	Gongmin Town		
Shaping RTL		Dongbo District, Meishan City	Taoyuan East Road	1955	Adopted present name in 1987.
Sichuan Chengdu RTL for Drug Offenders		Chengdu	Airport Development Zone		
Xinhua RTL		Mianyang City	135 East Section, 1 Circle Road	1970s	Also called Xinhua RTL for Drug Rehabilitation.

== Tianjin municipality ==
Name	Enterprise name	City/County/District	Village/Town	Established	Notes
Dasuzhuang RTL		Dagang District	Dasuzhuang		
Jianxin RTL		Hexi District, Tianjin Municipality			Has been disbanded, detainees sent to Tianjin Women's RTL.
Qingbowa RTL	Qingbowa Farm	Xiqing District, Tianjin Municipality		1980	
Shuangkou RTL		Beichen District, Tianjin Municipality			
Tianjin Municipal Banqiao RTL	Banqiao Farm Machinery Parts Factory	Dagang District, Tianjin Municipality		Oct 1955	Adopted current name in November 2003. Reported to hold Falun Gong practitioners.
Tianjin Women's RTL		Dagang District, Tianjin		2001	
Yushan RTL		Jixian County			

== Tibet Autonomous Region ==
Name	Enterprise name	City/County/District	Village/Town	Established	Notes
Changdu RTL		Unknown			
Duilong RTL		Doilungdêqên County, Lhasa			Possibly the same location as Trisam, known under an alternate name.
Lhasa RTL		Lhasa			
Ngari RTL		Ngari Prefecture	Ali, Tibet	July 2004	
Rikaze RTL		Shigatse Prefecture			
Trisam RTL			West or southwest of Lhasa	1991-1992	Believed to now be a mandatory education or rehabilitation centre. It has been proposed to now operate as Duilong Compulsory Isolation and Rehabilitation Centre. Trisam, known colloquially after a bridge nearby, is situated around 14 kilometres west of Lhasa city centre in the western suburbs, just inside Toelung Dechen (Chinese: Duilong Deqing) county. Under the RTL system, detainees could be imprisoned there by administrative order for up to three years, carrying out various labour tasks ranging from tending vegetables and emptying septic pits to performing construction labour. Four Trisam prisoners are known to have died between 1987 and 1998 due to abuse at Trisam and earlier places of detention, three of them within three months after release and one while in custody.
Xizang RTL		Troelung, Dechen County, 10 km. east of Lhasa		Sept 1991	Possibly the same location as Trisam, known under an alternate name.

== Xinjiang province ==
Name	Enterprise name	City/County/District	Village/Town	Established	Notes
Bole RTL		Bole County		1983	
Changji RTL		Wujiaqu City	About 5 kilometers outside the city		
Hami RTL		Kumul		Oct 1983	
Jiyinchuan RTL		Aksu		after 2000	
Kashi RTL		Kashgar	30 kilometers outside the city	Dec 1983	
Xinjiang Turpan RTL		Turpan City			
Urumqi RTL	Urumqi Artificial Diamond Factory	Ürümqi		1973	
Wusu RTL		Wusu		Dec 1983	
Xihu RTL for Drug Abusers		Wusu		June 1999	
Xinjiang Aksu RTL		Aksu Prefecture	74 Chaoyang Street, Yin-a-wa-ti Road	Oct 1983	
Xinjiang Women's RTL	Sweater workshop	Ürümqi	22 Donggebi Rd.	Dec 2002	Also called Urumqi Women's RTL
Yining RTL		Ghulja		1983	

== Yunnan province ==
Name	Enterprise name	City/County/District	Village/Town	Established	Notes
Anning RTL	Anning Bajie Farm	Anning	Bajie		
Dali RTL		Dali City	Tianjingshan	1992	Has some former drug users acting as staff
Dehong Prefecture RTL	Disposable Chopsticks Processing Plant	Dehong Dai and Jingpo Autonomous Prefecture		1993	
Kunming Drug Rehabilitation Center		Kunming	Wang Bridge		
Mojiang RTL		Mojiang Hani Autonomous County			
Provincial No. 2 RTL		Lufeng County, Chuxiong Yi Autonomous Prefecture	Renxing Town	1951	
Provincial No. 3 RTL	Mosha Subtropical Horticultural Farm; Food products factory; Beverage factory; Brown sugar factory	Mosha District, Xinping Yi and Dai Autonomous County		1956	
Qujing City RTL	Yinsheng Textile Factory	Qilin District, Qujing City	Poshi Street	Nov 2000	
Yunnan Province Drug Rehabilitation RTL				Sept 2002	
Yunnan Women's RTL		Guandu District, Kunming	Dabanqiao Town	Dec 1996	

== Zhejiang province ==
Name	Enterprise name	City/County/District	Village/Town	Established	Notes
Hangzhou No. 1 RTL		Hangzhou			
Hangzhou No. 2 RTL	Hongken Farm	Xiaoshan District, Hangzhou	Xinjie Town		
Huzhou RTL		Huzhou	Zhaowan Yangjiabu T. W.		
Jiaxing RTL		Jiaxing			
Moganshan RTL		Deqing County	Wukang	1994	Only women's RTL in the province
Ningbo RTL		Ningbo			
Shaoxing RTL		Shaoxing			
Shiliping RTL	Shiliping Farm	Jinhua			
Tangxi RTL		Hangzhou City			
Zhoushan RTL	Xinsheng Auto Repair Plant	Dinghai District, Zhoushan City		1983	

== See also ==
- One institution with two names

== Sources ==
Unless otherwise specified, information is from the following source:

- "Laogai Handbook (2007–2008)" (PDF). The Laogai Research Foundation. 2008. Archived from the original (PDF) on 17 October 2016.
