= Harry Wu =

Chinese-American human rights activist (1937–2016)

- 吴弘达
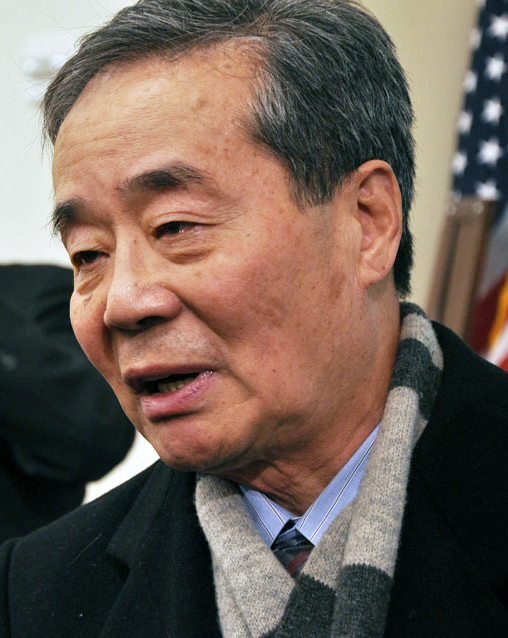
- Wu during a press conference at Washington D.C. in January 2011
- Born: February 8, 1936; Shanghai, China
- Died: April 26, 2016 (aged 79); Honduras
- Citizenship: United States
- Spouse: Ching Lee
- Children: 1

Chinese name
- Traditional Chinese: 吳弘達
- Simplified Chinese: 吴弘达
Transcriptions
Standard Mandarin
- Hanyu Pinyin: Wú Hóngdá

Harry Wu (Chinese: 吴弘达; pinyin: Wú Hóngdá; February 8, 1937 – April 26, 2016) was a Chinese-American human rights activist. Wu spent 19 years in Chinese labor camps, and he became a resident and citizen of the United States. In 1992, he founded the Laogai Research Foundation.

== Biography ==
=== Early life and education ===
Wu was born into an affluent family in Shanghai; his father was a banking official and his mother had descended from a family of well-to-do landlords.

Wu studied at the Geology Institute in Beijing, where he earned a degree. In 1956, the Communist Party began a campaign encouraging citizens, particularly students and intellectuals, to express their true views of the Party and the state of society (known as the Hundred Flowers Campaign). Although cautious, Wu eventually voiced some sentiments, by disagreeing with the Soviet Union's military intervention in Hungary, and the practice of labeling people into different categories.

By the Fall of 1956, China's leader, Mao Zedong abruptly reversed course and proclaimed that the true enemies of the Party had been exposed and 19-year-old Wu was subsequently singled out at his university. Wu later wrote of this experience: "This was the first time I had ever been singled out as a political troublemaker. Most of my classmates were more pragmatic than I, and they just repeated what the Communists wanted to hear." For the next few years, Wu was continuously criticized in Party meetings and closely monitored until his arrest in 1960 at the age of 23 when he was charged with being a "counterrevolutionary rightist", and was sent to the laogai (China's system of forced-labor prison camps).

=== Labor camp years ===
Harry Wu was imprisoned for 19 years in 12 different camps mining coal, building roads, clearing land, and planting and harvesting crops. According to his own accounts, he was beaten, tortured and nearly starved to death, and witnessed the deaths of many other prisoners from brutality, starvation, and suicide.

In the camps Wu met a rough, illiterate peasant with the nickname, "Big Mouth Xing". Wu wrote, "I could see how Big Mouth Xing had gotten his name. The corners of his mouth seemed to stretch all the way to his ears." Xing had experienced a lot of starvation in life, first in his rural village, and later in the camps, and had become obsessed with getting enough food.

Lean and muscular, with missing teeth and ears that "looked black with dirt", Xing taught Wu how to fight for survival in the camps. He showed Wu how to dig for underground rat burrows in order to find clean caches of grain and beans which could then later be boiled for food to avoid starvation. He also taught Wu how to be aggressive to discourage bullies. Wu came from an urban, educated background and was naive. Xing often repeated to Wu, "Nobody here will take care of you. You have to take care of yourself." Wu later wrote:

I was twenty-three, a college graduate raised in an affluent, urban family, and a political criminal. Xing Jingping, three years younger than I, was a peasant from a starving village, a thief with no education and no political viewpoint. The gulf between us was vast, yet I grew to admire him as the most capable and influential teacher of my life.

Wu was released from his life sentence in 1979 at the age of 42, as a result of political changes following the death of Mao Zedong. He obtained a teaching position at the Geoscience University in Beijing, but found that the label of having been a political prisoner continued to follow him. Wu also found that those who had played a part in labeling him "an enemy of the people", leading to his imprisonment twenty years earlier, tended to react to his survival and return the same way: "All that has happened is in the past ... the Party has suffered too."

Wu left China for the United States in 1985, after having received a chance invitation from the University of California at Berkeley to be a visiting scholar. (A faculty member at Berkeley had read an article that Wu had written in an academic journal on geology).

=== Early years in the U.S. ===
Wu arrived in the U.S. with only 40 dollars, a few clothes and an ink tiger print that he had inherited from his father. Since he did not have funding from the university for his first year he had to improvise. At first he was sleeping in the park, and on the Bay Area Rapid Transit when it rained. He got a night shift job making donuts at a donut shop for a few months; then a job at a liquor store, and was finally able to rent a cheap apartment. Wu continued with various odd jobs during this period and in 1988 began working for an electronic chip manufacturer, where he became an assistant manager, and was able to buy a used car. Looking back on this period of his life, Wu felt that there was opportunity and if he just worked hard he could make it.

During his first years in America, Wu did not want to think about or discuss politics. He felt that he had already lost the years of his youth and he wanted to establish a personal life and enjoy his freedom. But slowly he was drawn back into the discussion about prison camps in China and his own experiences. In 1986, Wu was asked to talk about his experiences in the camps in front of a class of college students at the University of California, Santa Cruz. As Wu spoke he started to cry as he felt he was being the voice for the many seemingly forgotten prisoners who had died.

=== Focus on the laogai regime ===
In 1988 Wu met with the curator of the East Asian Studies department at the Hoover Institution at Stanford to explain his interest in studying China's network of forced-labor prison camps. Wu did not have academic experience in social studies, only that of a geologist, but his stories about his time in the camps intrigued the curator, who invited Wu to pursue research as a visiting scholar. From that time on, Wu started compiling a catalog of the labor prison camp system within mainland China. Known in China as the laogai, which translates as "reform through labor", Wu eventually published Laogai: The Chinese Gulag in 1992. In the early 1990s, Wu made several trips into China in order to gather the evidence needed to prove the existence of the labor camps to the outside world — part of this involved visiting various camps and secretly recording images in photo and video.

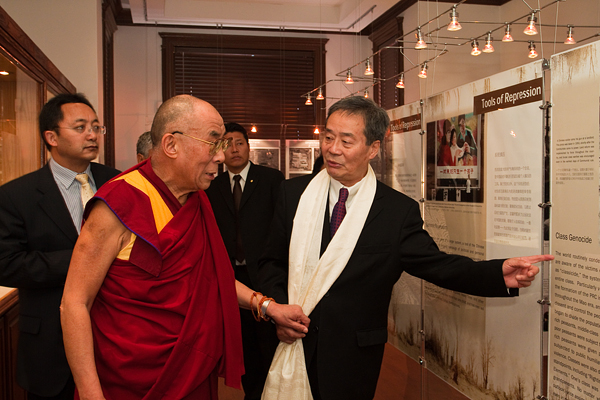
Harry Wu showing an exhibit to the Dalai Lama at the Laogai Museum, October 7, 2009

In 1990, Senators Alan Cranston (D-Calif.), and Jesse Helms (R-N.C.) invited Wu to testify before the Senate on laogai. In 1991, Wu did a story with Ed Bradley for 60 Minutes, in which they posed as businessmen interested in purchasing factory goods in mainland China that had been manufactured by the slave labor of Chinese prisoners.

In 1992, Wu established the Laogai Research Foundation, a non-profit research and public education organization. Among Wu's supporters was the AFL–CIO, America's largest federation of labour unions. In addition, the center's stated purpose is to also "document and publicize other systemic human rights violations in China, including ... the coercive enforcement of China's 'one-child' population control policy, and Internet censorship and surveillance."

In 1995, by then a U.S. citizen, he was arrested as he tried to enter China with illegal documentation. He was held by the Chinese government for 66 days before he was convicted for "stealing state secrets". He was sentenced to 15 years in prison, but was instead immediately deported from China. He attributes his release to an international campaign launched on his behalf.

In 2007, Wu criticized the selection of a Chinese sculptor, Lei Yixin, as the lead sculptor for the Martin Luther King Jr. Memorial because Lei had also carved statues celebrating Mao Zedong.

In November 2008, Wu opened the Laogai Museum in Washington, D.C., calling it the first United States museum to directly address human rights in China.

== Recognition ==
Wu received the Freedom Award from the Hungarian Freedom Fighters' Federation in 1991. In 1994 he received the first Martin Ennals Award for Human Rights Defenders. He was awarded the Courage of Conscience Award by the Peace Abbey in Sherborn, Massachusetts, on September 14, 1995 for his extraordinary sacrifices and commitment to exposing human rights violations in his motherland China. He received an honorary doctorate from the Institute of World Politics in Washington, DC in 2012.

In 1996, he was awarded the Geuzenpenning, the Medal of Freedom from the Dutch World War II Resistance Foundation. He also received honorary degrees from Saint Louis University and the American University of Paris. That same year, the Columbia Human Rights Law Review awarded Wu its second Award for Leadership in Human Rights. In 1997, Wu was presented with the Walter Judd Freedom Award by The Fund for American Studies for being an outspoken voice against tyranny and oppression.

Wu served as the Executive Director of the Laogai Research Foundation and the China Information Center. He was also a member of the International Council of the New York-based Human Rights Foundation. He was a member of the international advisory council of the Victims of Communism Memorial Foundation.

== Lawsuits ==
In 2007, Wu helped the relatives of Chinese dissidents Wang Xiaoning and Shi Tao sue Yahoo!, which had disclosed their IP addresses to the Chinese government, leading to their arrest and imprisonment. Yahoo settled the lawsuit by establishing a $17 million fund to compensate and help Chinese dissidents, and chose Wu as its administrator. In January 2011, Wang and his wife Yu Ling sued Wu, who allegedly demanded $1 million in kickbacks from Yu for his Laogai Research Foundation. Wu stated that Yu had willingly donated the money. The case was settled in April 2012 when Wu repaid the $1 million to Yu. Wu's alleged mishandling of the millions from Yahoo alienated him from many in the human rights community. Seven Chinese dissidents signed an open letter stating that Wu had spent $14–15 million of the Yahoo fund from 2008 to 2015, but only $700,000 was used to help Chinese dissidents.

In March 2015, a Virginia woman named Wang Jing publicly accused Wu of sexually assaulting her and three underage girls, the daughters of Chinese dissidents who were under her guardianship, in late 2013. Wu denied the accusation. Wang filed a lawsuit against Wu with the Fairfax County Circuit Court, and the case was scheduled to go on trial in January 2017. Due to Wu's death in 2016, it never did.

== Death ==
Wu died in Honduras on April 26, 2016, at the age of 79 while he was vacationing there with friends. He was survived by his former wife, Ching Lee, and his son, Harrison.

== Books ==
- Laogai: The Chinese Gulag (1992), the first full account of the Chinese labor camp system.
- Bitter Winds (1994), a memoir of his time in the camps.
- Troublemaker (1996), an account of Wu's clandestine trips to China and his detention in 1995.
- Thunderstorm in the Night (2003), Wu's first Chinese language book; an autobiography that spans his entire life.
- New Ghosts, Old Ghosts, Prisons and Labor Reform Camps in China (1999), by James Seymour and Richard Anderson
- Peter Braaksma (Editor), Nine Lives: Making the Impossible Possible (2009), New Internationalist Publications, which tells the stories of Wu & 8 others who, "operating outside the normal channels, have made the world a better, fairer place".
- The Sunflower (1998), by Simon Wiesenthal, Hary James Cargas (Editor), Bonny V. Fetterman (Editor)

== See also ==
- Chinese dissidents
- Censorship in China
- laojiao
