= Institute of Democratic Society =

Chinese human rights advocacy non-profit organisation

The Institute of Democratic Society is a Chinese human rights advocacy non-profit started in 2009 by Lan Zhixue and other lawyers. It has been involved in activism relating to several prominent controversies involving speech, dissent, internet freedom, civil procedures, and government transparency.
