= Beidagang Reservoir =

- Location within Tianjin
- Location: Dagang District, Tianjin
- Coordinates: 38°44′41″N 117°20′15″E
- Type: reservoir
- Primary inflows: Duliujian River (artificial branch of Hai River)
- Catchment area: 1,170 km^{2} (500 sq mi)
- Basin countries: China
- Max. length: 26 km (20 mi)
- Max. width: 11 km (7 mi)
- Surface area: 149 km^{2} (60 sq mi)
- Average depth: 7 m (20 ft)
- Water volume: 436,000,000 m^{3} (2×10^{10} cu ft)
- Shore length^{1}: 54.5 km (30 mi)
- ^{1} Shore length is not a well-defined measure.

Beidagang Reservoir is a large reservoir in southern Tianjin built between 1974 and 1980. It is the only large reservoir on the route of the Yellow River-Tianjin water transfer project. It serves as the water supply reservoir to the downtown of Tianjin and surrounding industrial and agricultural areas. The wetland around the reservoir is registered as a protected wetland of China.
