= Lan Zhixue =

Chinese human rights lawyer and activist

- Occupations: human rights activist and lawyer
- Known for: representing several prominent Chinese dissidents, co-founding the Institute of Democratic Society in China

Lan Zhixue is a Chinese human rights lawyer and activist who co-founded the Institute of Democratic Society, a non-profit organization whose website proclaims "fair, reasonable and legal; dare to think, speak and act". Lan Zhixue has been involved in advocacy for several controversial issues and part of a growing trend of lawyers publicly challenging (and being challenged by) the government. 2009 he explained, "We don't care about ourselves, our liberty or death," Lan said. "We want to do something for the ordinary people. There are more public interest lawyers like us now, though not as many as we would like." Lan has been vocal about his view of the irrepressibility of activism through technology: "There's an invisible hand trying to castrate the internet; maybe it's the last tactic they can apply if they can't cut off the internet or abolish the Constitution...But it's like drinking poison to quench your thirst. The flow of history won't go backwards, or move according to their will."

Notable involvement

- Cheng Jianping (also known as Wang Yi) Twitter posts - Since 2010 Lan Zhixue has been representing Cheng in a case involving Twitter comments said by her to be sarcastic but seen by the government as disrupting public order. Lan said, "This is ridiculous and a typical case of censorship jail... People should not be put in jail due to their sarcastic words." He appealed Cheng's case to the Henan Provincial Department of Justice and People's Court, asking for medical parole, since Cheng has high blood pressure, and asking that she be removed from the labor camp.
- Song Shaoyang AIDS contamination - Representing plaintiffs in cases where individuals were alleged to be infected with HIV through blood transfusions. Lan criticized, "The hospitals that caused the problem have no legal responsibility, and the victims receive no compensation."
- Tiananmen Square 20th anniversary protests - Human rights lawyers including Lan Zhixue were reportedly being followed and harassed by local police in the period before the anniversary.
- Charter 08 - A 2008 petition signed by 300 prominent Chinese citizens including Lan Zhixue. It was a manifesto calling for democracy and the rule of law to replace China's often criticized, one-party system.
- Deng Yujiao - A 21-year-old Chinese waitress who stabbed to death a local official who tried to rape her. She was sentenced to murder but the sentence was effectively suspended after a public outcry in which tens of thousands of internet users protested her case.
