= Laogai Research Foundation =

Chinese-American human rights NGO

- Founded: 1992
- Type: Non-profit; NGO
- Location: Washington, D.C., United States]
- Key people: Harry Wu, Executive Director
- Website: www.laogai.org

The Laogai Research Foundation is a human rights NGO located in Washington, D.C, United States. The foundation's mission is to "gather information on and raise public awareness of the Laogai—China's extensive system of forced-labor prison camps."

== History ==
The Laogai Research Foundation was founded in 1992 by Harry Wu, a former political prisoner in the People's Republic of China. Born in 1937 to a prosperous Shanghai family, Wu fell afoul of the Chinese Communist Party while in college and was deemed a counter-revolutionary rightist during the Anti-Rightist Movement. Wu was arrested in 1960 and sent to the Laogai, and he was eventually released some 19 years later. He emigrated to the United States in 1982 and began to publicize the systematic human rights abuses inflicted upon the Chinese people by the CCP. Ten years later, his efforts culminated into the founding of the Laogai Research Foundation.

== Current work ==
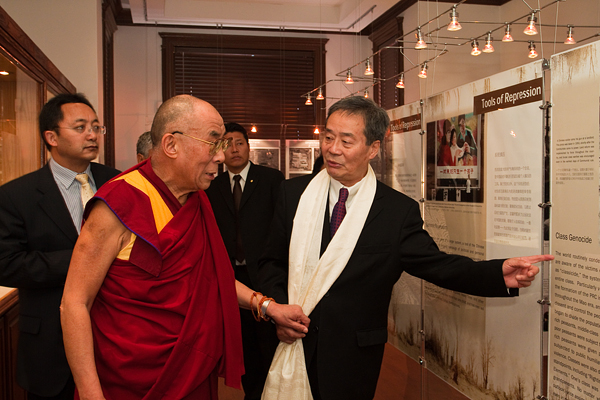
Harry Wu gives the 14th Dalai Lama of Tibet a tour of LRF's Laogai Museum in October 2009.

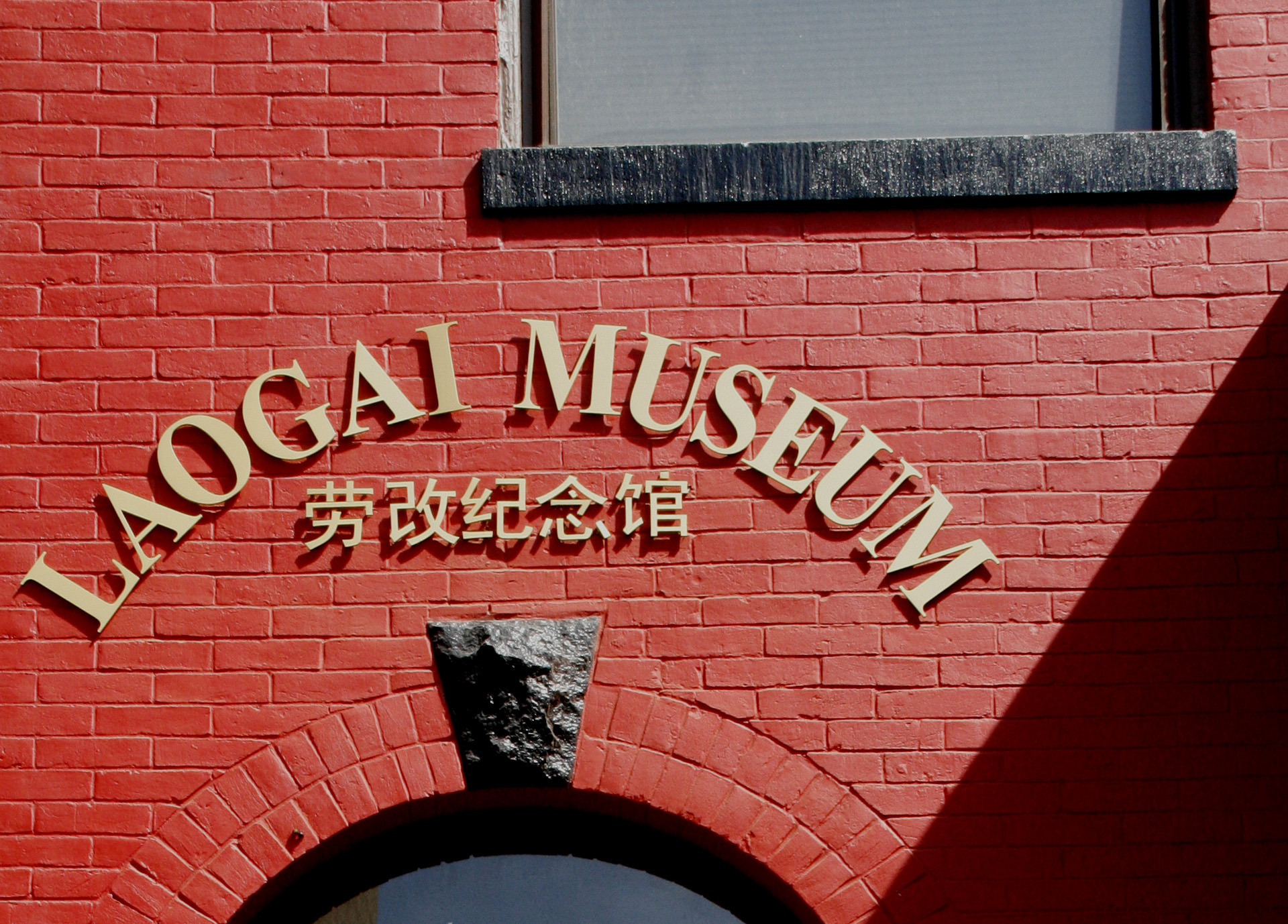
In 2009, The Laogai Museum, located at 1109 M St. NW Washington, DC was created with the support of the Yahoo! Human Rights Fund

The Laogai Research Foundation publishes an annually updated Laogai Handbook, which lists all known information about Laogai activities in China including individual camps' location, size, known inmates, manufactured products, and other statistics. The Foundation also researches American companies' ties to Laogai camps; in 1992, LRF documented Columbus McKinnon Chain Hoist Company's extensive use of Laogai products, a finding which the company's president eventually confirmed while testifying before Congress. In February 2010, the Foundation released a research report proving that China was actively advertising Laogai products and services online, including on Chinese government-sponsored sites, despite the fact that exporting Laogai products is illegal under Chinese law. Importing Laogai products is illegal in the United States, Germany, and Italy. Another recent project of the foundation includes Laogai: The Machinery of Repression in China, a full-length book detailing the history of the Laogai in China, which was edited by LRF Director Nicole Kempton and published in 2009 by Umbrage Editions. Other works have been published in Chinese. In addition, the LRF maintains two active blogs, one in English and one in Chinese, and Kempton maintains her own blog at The Huffington Post. In 2008, the LRF opened the Laogai Museum at the foundation's headquarters in Washington. The Dalai Lama made a notable visit to the Museum in 2009 as part of a meeting with Wu and Kempton. In April 2011, the LRF celebrated the grand opening of its fully renovated Laogai Museum at its new location in Dupont Circle.

The Laogai Research Foundation's extensive archive collection, comprising Chinese and U.S. government documents, personal testimonies from Laogai survivors, video, and press documents will be available online in Fall 2010.
