= Ankang (asylum) =

Hospital in China

Geography
- Location: China

Organisation
- Type: Psychiatric hospital or asylum

Ankang (Chinese: 安康) is a name shared by a number of psychiatric hospitals or asylums in China. The term literally means "peace and health [for the mentally ill]". Many of these institutions are prison-hospitals for holding prisoners judged to be mentally ill, and operate directly under the local Public Security Bureau. As a result, "ankang" is sometimes used in the Western press to denote the system of prison-hospitals in China. However, not all ankang hospitals are prison-hospitals, and some offer conventional psychiatric and medical treatment services.

Some patients sent to these institutions are political prisoners or Falun Gong practitioners. By some estimates 3,000 political prisoners are held in about 25 ankang institutions across China.

== List of ankang hospitals ==
According to the United States Department of State, there were 20 ankang hospitals in China in early 2009, which are overseen by the Ministry of Public Security.

- Beijing Ankang Hospital (北京市安康医院), Fangshan District (1800 beds), Psychiatric facilities: yes
- Chengdu Ankang Hospital (成都市安康医院) Sichuan (500 beds), Psychiatric facilities: yes
- Hangzhou Ankang Hospital (杭州安康医院), Zhejiang (520 beds)
- Jinan Ankang Hospital/Shandong province Ankang Hospital (济南安康医院/山东省安康医院), Shandong (1040 beds), Psychiatric facilities: yes
- Nanjing Ankang Hospital (南京市安康医院), Jiangsu (112 beds)
- Ningbo PSB Ankang Hospital (宁波市公安局安康医院), Zhejiang
- Shanghai PSB Ankang Hospital (上海市公安局安康医院)
- Tangshan Municipal Ankang Hospital (唐山市安康医院), Hebei (150 beds)
- Tianjin Municipal Ankang Hospital (天津市安康医院), Psychiatric facilities: yes
- Wuan Ankang Hospital (武安市安康医院), Hubei (Est 1988, 120 beds), Psychiatric facilities: yes
- Xi'an Ankang Hospital (西安市安康医院), Shaanxi (250 beds), Psychiatric facilities: yes

According to an August 2022 report by Safeguard Defenders, there are 25 ankang hospitals in China. In addition to these ankang facilities, the police also make use of general psychiatric facilities run by China's Ministry of Health and Ministry of Civil Affairs and of the 144 cases in the report, only four took place in an Ankang facility.

== Controversies ==
Wang Wanxing, a prominent democracy activist with a history of anti-government protest, was again arrested on June 4, 1992, when he unfurled a banner in Tiananmen Square on the third anniversary of the 1989 Tiananmen Square protests. He was swiftly arrested and locked up in a psychiatric hospital near Beijing, for alleged "political monomania". Following his release in 2006, Wang was examined for two days by Dr. Raes and Dr. van der Meer, who said in a statement: "He was not suffering from any mental disorder that could justify his admission." Human Rights Watch says it has documented 3,000 cases of psychiatric punishment of political dissidents since the early 1980s.

In 2000, Robin J. Munro drew attention when he made allegations of abuses of forensic psychiatry in China. In 2002, Human Rights Watch and the Geneva Initiative on Psychiatry issued a report which alleged that Chinese dissidents, independent labour organisers, whistle-blowers and individuals who complain about official misconduct have been labelled "political maniacs" and locked up in mental hospitals simply for opposing the government. Symptoms of "political mania" as defined by the police include "shout[ing] reactionary slogans, writ[ing] reactionary banners and reactionary letters, mak[ing] anti-government speeches in public, and express[ing] opinions on important domestic and international affairs". Such individuals may be detained indefinitely in ankang centres.

In August 2022, Safeguard Defenders issued an 85-page report on forced hospitalization in psychiatric hospitals between 2015 and 2021 based on 144 cases involving 99 victims. Almost a third of the 99 victims had been sent to psychiatric facilities two or more times. Once inside, victims may stay there for months, even years. Nine victims have been inside for ten or more years. According to the report, victims are mostly petitioners and activists.

== See also ==
- Black jails
- Laogai
- Political abuse of psychiatry#China
