= Re-education through labor =

System of administrative detention in mainland China

- Traditional Chinese: 勞動教養
- Simplified Chinese: 劳动教养
Transcriptions
Standard Mandarin
- Hanyu Pinyin: láodòng jiàoyǎng

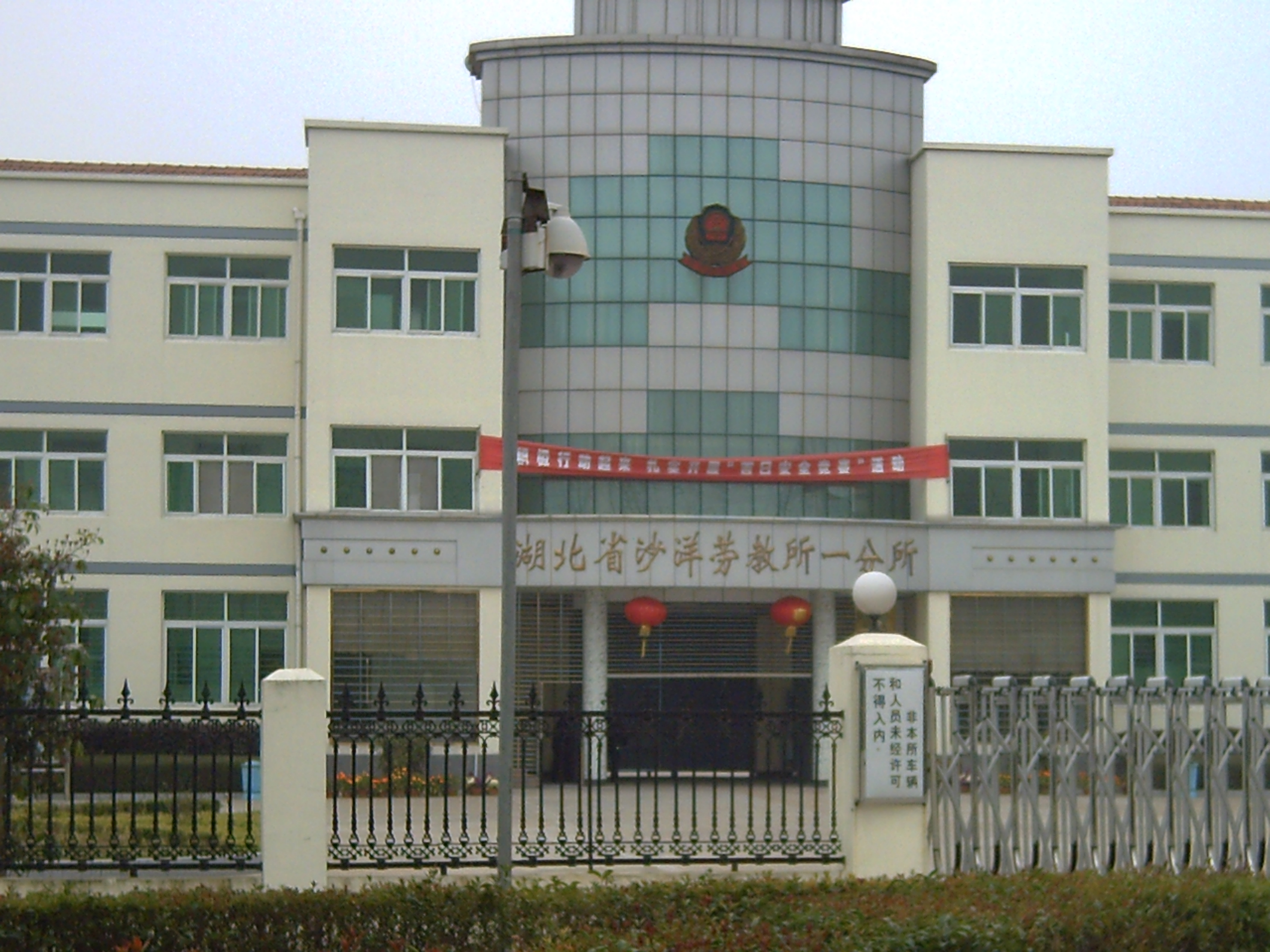
A photograph of Shayang Re-education Through Labor camp in Hubei province, from the archives of the Laogai Museum

Re-education through labor (RTL), abbreviated as laojiao (simplified Chinese: 劳教; traditional Chinese: 勞教; pinyin: láojiào), was an extrajudicial system of administrative detention in the People's Republic of China. Officially active from 1957 to 2013, the system was used to detain persons who were accused of committing minor crimes such as petty theft, prostitution, and trafficking of illegal drugs, as well as political dissidents, petitioners, and Falun Gong followers. It was separated from the much larger laogai system of prison labor camps.

Sentences under re-education through labor were typically for one to three years, with the possibility of an additional one-year extension. They were issued as a form of administrative punishment by police, rather than the judicial system. While they were incarcerated, detainees were frequently subjected to a form of political education so they may serve the needs of the nation through productivity and a "love to labor". Estimates of the number of RTL detainees on any given year range from 190,000 to two million. In 2013, approximately 350 RTL camps were in operation.

On 28 December 2013, the Standing Committee of the National People's Congress abolished the re-education through labor system and detainees were released. However, human rights groups have claimed that other forms of extrajudicial detention have taken its place, with some former RTL camps being renamed drug rehabilitation centers.

In 2014, re-education facilities were constructed in Xinjiang and they were used to target a wider context than people who were accused of committing minor crimes and political dissidence. By 2017, these had become the massive Xinjiang re-education camps holding 1–3 million people, utilizing forced labor, now recognized as re-education camps by many nations and intergovernmental organizations such as the UN, EU, and human rights groups.

== Re-education through labor and the Chinese penal system ==
The People's Republic of China employs several forms of correction for people who have been arrested, of which re-education through labor was one. The Laogai Research Foundation classifies re-education through labor as a sub-component under the umbrella of the laogai ("reform through labor") criminal justice system, which generally refers to prisons, prison farms, and labor camps for convicted criminals. Re-education through labor, on the other hand, refers to detentions for persons who are not considered criminals or have only committed minor offenses. Persons detained under re-education through labor were detained in facilities which are separate from the general prison system; furthermore, detainees in these re-education facilities receive a small salary, which laogai detainees do not, and in theory have shorter work hours. The laogai system is much larger than the re-education through labor system, with the Laogai Research Foundation identifying 1,045 laogai camps in 2006 (compared to 346 re-education centers). Both systems, however, involve penal labor and often do not allow trials or judicial hearings. The term "reform through labor" or laogai was officially replaced with "prison" in 1994, and the term "re-education center" or láojiàosuǒ (劳教所) was replaced with "correctional center" in 2007.

Other components of the prison system include detention centers for individuals awaiting sentence or execution, and juvenile detention camps for individuals under a minimum age (which has varied through the years, and may currently be under 14). The system formerly included components such as custody and repatriation for individuals without a residence permit; "forced job placement," which has not been widely practiced since the 1990s; and "shelter and investigation," a system of detentions for individuals under legal investigation, which was abolished in 1996. The Laogai Research Foundation also classifies psychiatric facilities, or ankang, as a form of detention for political dissidents, although it is not officially recognized as part of the laogai penal system.

== History ==
Institutions similar to re-education through labor facilities, but called "new life schools" or "loafers' camps", existed as early as 1949, however, they did not become officially recognized until the anti-rightist campaigns in 1957 and 1958. These facilities were often housed by those the Chinese Communist Party deemed as "social parasites." Immediately following the Chinese Civil War, starting in Beijing, the party would systematically detain prostitutes, vagrants, and other members of the lumpenproletariat. A report by Human Rights in China (HRIC) states that re-education through labor was first used by the Chinese Communist Party (CCP) in 1955 to punish counter-revolutionaries, and in 1957 was officially adopted into law to be implemented by the Ministry of Public Security. Other prominent historians, however, have pointed to evidence that the forced labor systems were used far earlier in April of 1949. Those same historians have also pointed that deaths in the re-education institutes began as early as December 1949. The law allowed police to sentence both minor offenders, the lumpenproletariat, and "counter-revolutionaries" or "anti-socialist elements" to be interned in labor institutions without the right to a judicial hearing or trial, and did not allow judicial review to take place until after the punishment was being enforced. In the beginning there were no limits to the length for which detainees could be sentenced, and it was not until 1979 that a maximum sentence of four years (three years' sentence plus one-year extension) was set. In 1983, the management and implementation of the re-education through labor system was passed from the Ministry of Public Security to the Ministry of Justice.

When Falun Gong was banned in mainland China in 1999, re-education through labor became a common punishment for practitioners. Some human rights groups claim that as many as 10,000 Falun Gong members were detained in between 1999 and 2002, with as many as 5,000 detained in 2001.

More recent estimates suggest that hundreds of thousands of Falun Gong adherents are imprisoned in China, with some sources estimating up to half of the official reeducation through labor camp population is Falun Gong practitioners. In some labor camps, Falun Gong practitioners make up the majority population.

There have been numerous calls for the system to be reformed or replaced. As early as 1997, the United Nations Working Group on Arbitrary Detention (WGAD) called for China to allow judicial control over detentions; in 2000, the UN Committee Against Torture recommended that all forms of administrative detention, including re-education through labor, be abolished; in 2004, the WGAD called for the establishment of rights to due process and counsel for individuals detained; and in 2005, the Special Rapporteur on Torture called for the outright abolition of re-education through labor. The prominent deaths of two inmates in spring 2003 prompted many calls within China for reform of the system, but reform did not happen immediately, though The China Daily reported that there was "general consensus" that reform was needed. In March 2007, however, the Chinese government did announce that it would abolish the re-education through labor system and replace it with a more lenient set of laws. According to the proposal, the maximum sentence would be lowered from four years to 18 months; re-education centers would be renamed "correction centers" and have their fences and gates removed. A month later, Chongqing municipality passed a law allowing lawyers to offer legal counsel in re-education through labor cases.

Many human rights groups, however, doubted the efficacy of the proposed reforms, saying that the new laws would only help minor criminals and not help political prisoners, and the reforms would not actually abolish the re-education through labor system. The Laogai Research Foundation stated that lowering the maximum length of detention and changing the names of the detention facilities would not constitute a "fundamental change". Nine months after the declaration that the laws would be rewritten, the re-education through labor system had not been abolished; in December 2007, a group of academics drafted an open letter to the government calling for an end to the system. During the 2008 Summer Olympics in Beijing, there were reports that some individuals who applied for permits to protest were detained without trial; of these, some were sentenced to re-education through labor. In the United Nations Human Rights Council's September 2008 Universal Periodic Review of the People's Republic of China, re-education through labor was listed as an "urgent human rights concern," and as of February 2009, a large number of re-education through labor camps were still in operation.

=== Statistics ===
Reports on re-education through labor have found it difficult to estimate the number of people in re-education centers, and nationwide statistics were often unavailable in the past. What data have become available often vary widely.

Number of RTL detentions per year and overall
| Source | Year | Number of detainees in given year | Number of detainees since founding |
|---|---|---|---|
| PRC government | 2009 | 190,000 | |
| PRC government | 2003 | 230,000 | |
| China Labour Bulletin | 2007 | 300,000 | |
| Laogai Research Foundation | 2006, 2008 | 500,000–2 million | |
| Unspecified non-governmental organizations | 2003 | 310,000 | |
| Human Rights in China (organization) | 2001 | 200,000 (in 1990s) | |
| Human Rights Watch | 1998 | 230,000 (in 1997) | |
| Xinhua official news agency | 2001 | | 3.5 million |
| China Daily | 2007 | | 6 million |

Of these detainees, 5 to 10 percent are estimated to be political prisoners, and as many as 40 percent are estimated to be drug offenders—in 1998, nearly one-third of the known re-education camps were specifically built for the purpose of holding drug offenders.

The China Daily estimated that there were a total of 310 re-education centers in China in 2007. The 2008 edition of the Laogai Research Foundation's biennial report listed exactly 319 "confirmed" re-education centers in China, and 74 "unconfirmed" ones, but it also estimated that the actual number of such centers might be much higher. the provinces with the most centers being Guangdong (31), Heilongjiang (21), and Henan (21). In a February 2009 meeting of the United Nations Human Rights Council, the Chinese government stated that there are 320 centers. The provinces with the largest numbers of re-education centers include Guangdong, Liaoning, Heilongjiang, and Henan. At the end of 2008, there were 350 labor camps and 160,000 prisoners were being held in them.

== Detentions ==
=== Conviction and detention ===
Sentencing for re-education through labor is generally carried out by the police rather than by the judicial system, so individuals are rarely charged or tried before being detained. Public security bureaus (police offices) are able to carry out administrative detentions for "minor" infringements that are not considered criminal acts; at least one analyst has suggested that local public security bureaus often abuse their authority and detain individuals for things such as personal vendettas. Individuals may also be sentenced to re-education through labor by courts, but the proportion of individuals who receive trials rather than going directly into administrative detention is determined in part by how much capacity that province has for re-education detainees—provinces with large re-education through labor apparatus generally allow fewer detainees to have trials. Where detainees have been allowed a trial, their lawyers have faced "intimidation and abuse," according to some reports, and the individuals under trial have sometimes been convicted on the basis of confessions that were coerced through "torture and severe psychological pressure." In at least one instance, convicted individuals were sent to re-education through labor even after being found not guilty in a trial.

Most detainees in re-education through labor facilities are reported to be drug users, petty criminals, and prostitutes, as well as some political prisoners; James Seymour has also claimed that most individuals sentenced to re-education through labor are from urban areas. Individuals who attempt to leave the country illegally have also been sentenced to re-education through labor upon their return. In periods leading up to visits from foreign dignitaries or politically sensitive anniversaries (such as the anniversary of the Tiananmen Square protests of 1989), local authorities have supposedly detained "undesirables" such as the homeless, mentally or physically disabled individuals, and migrant workers. One China specialist at the RAND Corporation has claimed that the police, faced with a lack of "modern rehabilitation and treatment programs," use re-education through labor convictions to "warehouse" individuals for "an increasing number of social problems."

Detainees can seek to have their detention repealed through an "administrative review" (xingzheng fuyi, 行政复议) of the decision or by filing an "administrative litigation" (xingzheng susong 行政诉讼) against the Re-education Through Labor Management Committee that detained them. According to the advocacy group Chinese Human Rights Defenders, however, these options are ineffective and the groups overseeing the reviews and litigations often have the same interests as the management committee that originally ordered the detention.

=== Conditions in the facilities ===
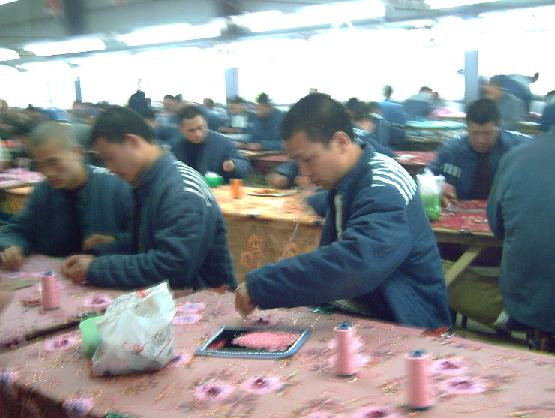
Workers in the Shayang Re-education Through Labor camp; photo from the archives of the Laogai Museum

The United States Department of State called the conditions in prisons "harsh and frequently degrading," and said the conditions in re-education through labor facilities were similar, citing overcrowded living spaces, low-quality food, and poor or absent medical care. Detainees in camps are required to work for little or no pay; while Chinese law requires that prison laborers' workday be limited to 12 hours a day. In 2001, sociologist Dean Rojek estimated that detainees generally worked six days a week, "in total silence." Much of the labor done by re-education through labor detainees is geared towards agriculture or producing goods, many of which are sold internationally, since re-education through labor detainees are not counted as official "prisoners" and therefore not subject to international treaties. They also perform work ranging "from tending vegetables and emptying septic pits to cutting stone blocks and construction work."

Although drug abusers are ostensibly placed in re-education through labor to be treated for their addictions, some testimonial evidence has suggested that little "meaningful treatment" takes place in at least some of the centers, and that drug abusers often relapse into addiction upon their release from detention.

The facilities have been widely criticized for the physical abuse that is said to go on within them. Corporal punishment is commonly used, and torture and physical abuse are also thought to be widespread in the facilities. In April 2003, Zhang Bin, an inmate at the re-education facility Huludao City Correctional Camp, was beaten to death, reportedly by other inmates and by the labor supervisor. Zhang's death, along with the March 2003 death of inmate Sun Zhigang in a custody and repatriation prison, sparked calls within China for reform of the system, although reforms were not made immediately.

Though most reports describe the conditions of re-education camps as "brutal," there are some claims of prisoners being well-treated. For example, when he was released from a three-year re-education sentence in 1999, dissident Liu Xiaobo said that he had been treated very mildly, that he had been allowed to spend time reading, and that the conditions had been "pretty good."

Forced labor may include breaking rocks and assembling car seat covers.

In a single report from The Guardian in 2011, it is alleged that internees were forced to play the online MMO World of Warcraft to generate digital gold currency for profit; however, this claim has never been verified independently and relies on a single former inmate's testimony.

According to Chinese state media Xinhua, slightly over 50% of detainees released from prison and re-education through labor in 2006 received government aid in the form of funds or assistance in finding jobs.

=== Life after release ===
Detainees who are released from re-education through labor camps may still be unable to travel or see other people freely. Individuals who remain in re-education through labor for 5 or more years may not be allowed to return to their homes, and those who do may be closely monitored and not permitted to leave certain areas. For example, in July 2003 a priest who had been released from detention was kept under house arrest, and five men who attempted to visit him were themselves detained.

== Criticism ==
The re-education through labor system has been criticized by human rights groups, foreign governments and UN bodies, and Chinese rights lawyers. Some Chinese government agencies and reformers within government have likewise criticized the system as being unconstitutional, and advocated for its reform or abolition.

Human Rights Watch has stated that the "re-education through labor" system violates international law, specifically Article 9 (4.)of the International Covenant on Civil and Political Rights (ICCPR), which provides that "Anyone who is deprived of his liberty by arrest or detention shall be entitled to take proceedings before a court, in order that the court may decide without delay on the lawfulness of his detention..." Re-education through labor has also been criticized by numerous human rights groups for not offering procedural guarantees for the accused, and for being used to detain political dissidents, teachers, Chinese house church leaders, and Falun Gong practitioners. Furthermore, even though the law up until 2007 specified a maximum length of detainment of four years, at least one source mentions a "retention for in-camp employment" system that allowed authorities to keep detainees in the camps for longer than their official sentences.

Re-education through labor has been a focus of discussion not only among foreign human rights groups, but also among legal scholars in China, some of whom were involved in the drafting of the 2007 laws meant to replace the system.

In addition to legal scholars, the Supreme People's Court of the People's Republic of China had criticized the system. In light of the widespread disapproval of the system, HRIC called in 2001 for the system to be abolished entirely. Among its criticisms it cited the fact that the wording of re-education through labor laws was excessively vague, allowing authorities to manipulate it; the fact that the punishment given in re-education centers was too severe for the crimes committed; the abusive conditions at re-education centers; and the variation of re-education through labor laws from one province to another. The Chinese Ministry of Justice, has also noted that the system violated items in the Constitution of China. Wang Gongyi, vice-director of the Institute of Justice Research affiliated to the Ministry of Justice, said that the re-education through labor system contradicts several items in the Constitution, the Criminal Procedure Law, and the International Covenant on Civil and Political Rights, which China signed in 1998.

Although many human rights groups and legal scholars both within and without China called for the reform or total abolition of re-education through labor, China's security agencies have defended the use of the system as being necessary to maintain social stability. A 1997 report in China's Legal Daily hailed re-education through labor as a means to "maintain social peace and prevent and reduce crime." The Ministry of Public Security stated in 2005 that re-education through labor helped maintain rule of law and was mainly used for rehabilitating lawbreakers. In 2007, when new laws were drafted, the Ministry of Public Security was opposed to the proposal that would allowing judicial review before punishment was enforced.

=== Profit opportunities ===
The laojiao system employs tens of thousands of people. Profits are made through sale of the products of forced labor and through the collection of bribes received to reduce sentences or to ensure that relatives receive adequate food.

== Abolition ==
During the third plenum of the 18th Party Central Committee in Beijing on 15 November 2013, Chinese officials announced that they planned to abolish the Re-education Through Labor system.

The planned abolition of the system, however, has been criticised by human rights groups, with Amnesty International issuing a report titled "Changing the Soup but Not the Medicine." Amnesty's report concludes that the camp closures are a positive step forward for human rights, but the fundamental problems of arbitrary detention remain in China:

Many of the policies and practices which resulted in individuals being punished for peacefully exercising their human rights by sending them to RTL have not fundamentally changed: quite the contrary. There is ample evidence that such policies and practices are continuing in full force. The latest anti-Falun Gong campaign, launched earlier this year and intended to operate for three years, shows that the CCP's determination to rid China of this spiritual group has not abated. Falun Gong practitioners continue to be punished through criminal prosecution and being sent to "brainwashing centres" and other forms of arbitrary detention. Petitioners likewise continue to be subjected to harassment, forcibly committed to mental institutions and sent to "black jails" and other forms of arbitrary detention. Human rights defenders, democracy advocates, whistle-blowers and other political activists are also being increasingly targeted through criminal detention, "black jails", short-term administrative detention, and enforced disappearances, rather than RTL.

On 28 December 2013, the Standing Committee of the National People's Congress abolished the re-education through labor system. Detainees were released without finishing their sentences.

== See also ==
- Custody and repatriation
- Human rights in the People's Republic of China
- List of Re-education Through Labor camps in China
- Mao Hengfeng, a human rights activist, who has been repeatedly ill-treated and tortured in the RTL camps.
