= Laogai =

Chinese penal labor system

- Simplified Chinese: 劳改
- Traditional Chinese: 勞改
Transcriptions
Standard Mandarin
- Hanyu Pinyin: láogǎi

Full name
- Simplified Chinese: 劳动改造
- Traditional Chinese: 勞動改造
- Literal meaning: reform through labor
Transcriptions
Standard Mandarin
- Hanyu Pinyin: láodòng gǎizào

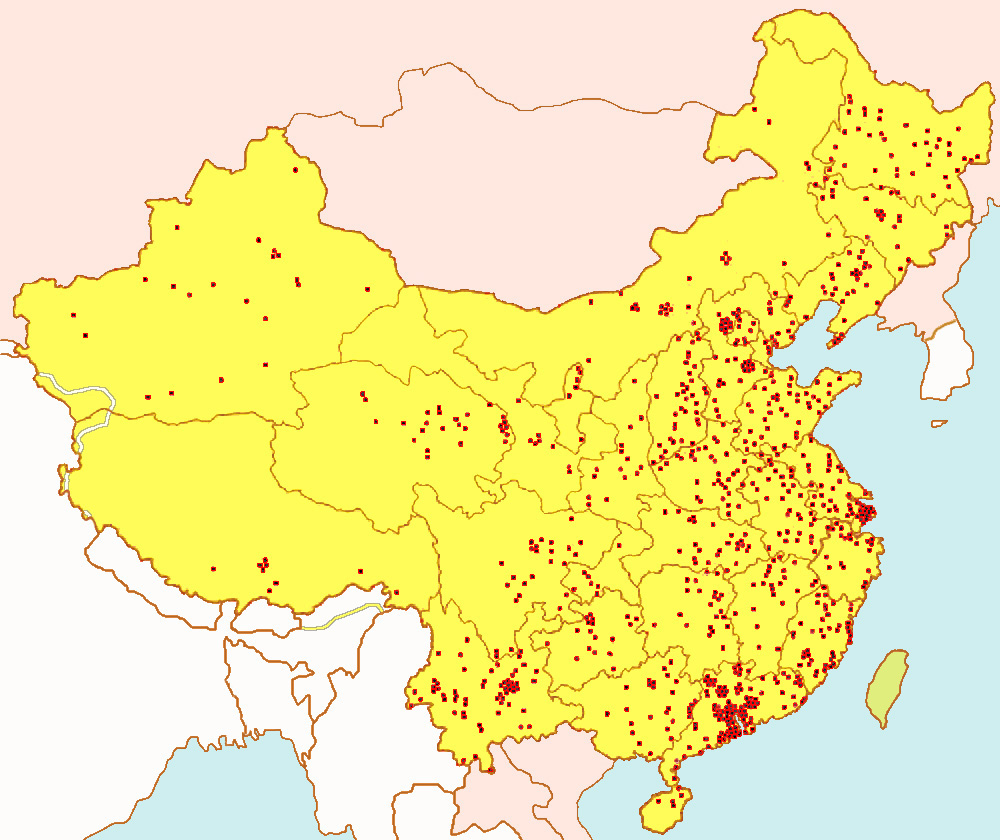
Locations of laogai camps in the 1990s, according to Harry Wu

Laogai (Chinese: 劳改), short for láodòng gǎizào (劳动改造), which means reform through labor, was a criminal justice system involving the use of penal labor and prison farms in the People's Republic of China (PRC). Láogǎi (劳改) is different from láojiào (劳教), or re-education through labor, which was the abolished administrative detention system for people who were not criminals but had committed minor offenses, and was intended to "reform offenders into law-abiding citizens". Persons who were detained in the laojiao were detained in facilities that were separate from those which comprised the general prison system of the laogai. Both systems, however, were based on penal labor.

Some writers have likened the laogai to slavery.

== History ==
=== Maoist era ===
During the 1950s and 1960s, Chinese prisons, which were similar to organized factories, contained large numbers of people who were considered too critical of the government or "counter-revolutionaries". However, many people arrested for political or religious reasons were released in the late 1970s at the start of the Deng Xiaoping reforms (known as reform and opening).

In the 21st century, critics have said that Chinese prisons produce products for sale in foreign countries, with the profits going to the PRC government. Products include everything from green tea to industrial engines to coal dug from mines. According to James D. Seymour and Richard Anderson, who both teach at Chinese schools, the products made in laogai camps comprise an insignificant amount of mainland China's export output and gross domestic product. They argue that the use of prison labor for manufacturing is not in itself a violation of human rights, and that most prisoners in Chinese prisons are serving time for what are generally regarded as crimes in the West. The West's criticism of the laogai is based not only on the export of products made by forced labor, but also on the claims of detainees being held for political or religious violations, such as leadership of unregistered Chinese House Churches.

=== Market reform era ===
Structural changes following the introduction of market reforms have reduced tax revenue to local governments, increasing pressure for local governments to supplement their income from elsewhere. At the same time, prisoners usually do not make a good workforce. The products manufactured by prison labor in China are of low quality and have become unsalable on the open market in competition with products made by non-imprisoned paid labor.

In 1994 the laogai camps were renamed "prisons". However, Chinese criminal law still stipulates that prisoners able to work shall "accept education and reform through labor". The existence of an extensive network of forced-labor camps producing consumer goods for export to Europe and the United States became classified. Publication of information about China's prison system by Al Jazeera English resulted in its expulsion from China on May 7, 2012.

=== Modern era ===
In 2003, the word "laogai" entered the Oxford English Dictionary. It entered the German Duden in 2005, and French and Italian dictionaries in 2006.

In 1992, writer Harry Wu, who had spent the period 1960 to 1979 in laogai camps, created the Laogai Research Foundation, a human rights NGO located in Washington, DC. In 2008, Wu opened the Laogai Museum in Washington, D.C., calling it the first ever United States museum to directly address human rights in China. In 2008, the Laogai Research Foundation estimated that approximately 1,045 laogai facilities were operating in China, and contained an estimated 500,000 to 2 million detainees.

In 2013, there were approximately 350 camps. Laogai was ended that year.

== Conditions in Laogai camps ==
=== Clothing ===
Unlike Laojiao (re-education through labor) inmates, Laogai inmates were issued uniforms. Depending on the locale and its economic situation, the quality of uniforms can vary significantly. Some prisoners may receive black or grey while others wear dark red or blue. Also depending on location, the clothing is available in different thicknesses. Commonly stamped on the uniforms were the Chinese characters for fan and lao gai meaning "criminal" and "reform through labor," respectively. Also issued to the prisoners were a pair of shoes made of rubber or plastic. These minimums do not meet the needs of the prisoners, who must purchase underclothes, socks, hats, and jackets with their monthly earnings of 2.5–3 yuan (US$0.37–US$0.44 as of April 11, 2009). Jackets were rare in the Mao era and were commonly made from patches of old blankets rather than from original cloth. Washing clothes was also rare, but clothing supplies in prisons have improved since the mid-Deng-Jiang Era.

=== Food ===
Food distribution has varied much through time, similar to its variation across the "over 1,155 documented laogai" camps. One camp near Beijing distributes between 13.5 and 22.5 kg of food per person per month. This is about average. The food consists of sorghum and corn, which are ground into flour and made into bread or gruel. The prisoners of the Beijing camp also receive 3 ounces of cooking oil per month. Every 2 weeks, the prisoners receive "a special meal of pork broth soup and white-flour steamed buns". Important Chinese holidays, such as New Year's, National Day, and the Spring Festival, are celebrated with meat dumplings, an exception in an otherwise meatless diet.

Food is distributed by one person per squad, which consists of about 10 people. This prisoner, called the zhiban or "duty prisoner," delivers the food to the rest of his group in large bowls on a cart. This often involves pushing the cart a great distance to the place where the others are working. Each day prisoners receive gruel, bread, and a watery vegetable soup made from the cheapest vegetables available. Some camps have reported two meals a day, while others allow three. Food is rationed according to rank and productive output, which is believed to provide motivation to work.

During the Mao era, food was very scarce in prisons, not only because of a nationwide famine which occurred during the Great Leap Forward (1959–1962), but also because of the harsher rules which were imposed on prisoners. Since little food was available, prisoners would scavenge anything which they came across while they were working. Instances in which prisoners ate "field mice, crickets, locusts, toads, grapevine worms, grasshoppers, insect larvae and eggs, and venomous snakes" were documented. Also, many inmates would steal produce from the fields which they worked on, smuggling vegetables back to their barracks. In Jiabiangou, Gansu, around 2,500 out of 3,000 prisoners died of starvation between 1960 and 1962, with some survivors resorting to cannibalism.

The lack of nutrition was a big problem in the camps, especially from the early 1950s through the 1960s, during the early years of the history of the PRC (People's Republic of China). Before the CCP (Chinese Communist Party) took control, hunger was rarely used to control prisoners. Early leaders of the CCP realized the power of withholding food from rebellious prisoners and, until recently, this practice was very common. Since the early 1990s, some camps in the coastal regions of Eastern China have improved the quality and amount of food.

=== Living quarters and sanitation ===
The living quarters, commonly referred to as barracks in most Laogai literature, were relatively primitive. Most had floors made of cement or wood, but some were of only straw and/or earth. The latrine was a bucket, and no furniture was provided. The prisoners slept on the floor in a space 30 cm wide, with 10 people per room. New prisoners were forced to sleep nearest to the latrine while more senior ones slept near the opposite wall.

Baths and showers were very rare and often not mentioned at all in memoirs. The only form of washing was the use of a water basin, which was only slightly less rare. This was ineffective because the entire squad used the same water. Basic essentials, such as a toothbrush and toothpaste, toilet paper, soap, and towels were not provided; prisoners had to spend their wages to acquire them. Prisoners were known to have spread manure, both human and animal, and been required to eat immediately without being able to wash their hands.

The sleeping quarters were surrounded on all sides by a wall. This wall is about 20 feet high and topped with electrical fencing. There were also sentry towers on each corner. Outside this wall was 40 feet of empty space, followed by another wall, similar to the first but larger.

=== Disease and pests ===
The Laogai camps were infested with many types of pests. Bed bugs were so numerous that at night they often moved in swarms. This behavior earned them the Laogai nickname of tanks or "tanke". They sucked the blood of the prisoners, leaving little red welts all over their bodies. These welts itched, and severe cases led to inmates scratching their skin raw, leading to dangerous infections. Another common pest was lice; some prisoners were known to eat them to supplement their meager diet. No insecticide or pesticides were used in the camps. The prisoner Zhang Xianliang wrote that "the parasites on a single inmate's underpants would be as numerous as the words on the front page of a newspaper". He noted fleas would be so numerous that they would "turn his quilt purplish black with their droppings". Roundworms were also a common threat to the prisoners' health, especially in laogai farms, where human excrement was used as fertilizer.

Along with a poor diet came many diet-related diseases: beriberi, edema, scurvy, and pellagra were the most common, due to lack of vitamins. Other health problems caused by the lack of healthy food included severe diarrhea or constipation from the lack of oil and fiber. These two were often left untreated and, added to the continuous strain of 12 hours of manual labor, weakened the immune system. Eventually, death followed many of these conditions. Two diseases rampant among the populations of these camps were tuberculosis and hepatitis. Highly contagious, these were also often left untreated until it was too late. Each morning, the cadre of the camp decided who was sick enough to stay in the barracks and miss the day of work. Many prisoners were forced to work when they were ill. Mental illness used to be very common during the Mao era, when prisoners had to spend 2 hours each evening being indoctrinated. The brainwashing that occurred over the amount of time people were imprisoned could be so intense that they were driven to insanity and, in many cases, suicide.

=== "Reform through labor" ===
Forced labor defines Laogai prison camps, according to Harry Wu, who has characterized the system as:

Prisoners are roused from bed at 5:30 a.m., and at 6:00 a.m. the zhiban from the kitchen wheels in a cart with tubs of corn gruel and cornbread ... at 7:00 a.m. the company public security cadre (captain) comes in, gathers all the prisoners together, and authorizes any sick prisoners to remain in the barracks. Once at the worksite, the captain delegates production responsibilities ...

At lunchtime the zhiban arrives pulling a handcart with a large tub of vegetable soup, two hunks of cornbread for each prisoner, and a large tube of drinking water ... after about 30 minutes, work is resumed until the company chief announces quitting time in the evening. Generally the prisoners return to the barracks at about 6:30 p.m. Upon return it is once again a dinner of cornbread, corn gruel, and vegetable soup. At 7:30 p.m., the 2-hour study period begins... At 9:30 p.m., no matter what the weather, all prisoners gather together outside the barracks for roll call and a speech from the captain. At around 10:00 p.m., everyone goes to bed.

During the night no lights are allowed and no one is allowed to move about. One must remain in one's assigned sleeping place and wait until 5:30 a.m. the next morning before getting up, when the whole cycle begins again.

Quota-filling was a big part of the inmates' lives in Laogai camps. Undershooting or overshooting the target productivity governs their quality of life. Not making the number may result in solitary confinement or loss of food privileges. Generally, food rations are cut by 10–20% if a worker fails to meet the standard. Some prisoners excel and are able to do more than what is required of them. They sometimes receive extra or better quality food. It has been argued that this extra food is not worth the extra calories burned to be more productive, so many prisoners choose to do the minimum with minimum effort, thereby saving as much energy as possible.

Working conditions in Laogai camps are often described as substandard:

Investigators from the Laogai Research Foundation have confirmed sites where prisoners mine asbestos and other toxic chemicals with no protective gear, work with batteries and battery acid with no protection for their hands, tan hides while standing naked in vats filled 3-feet deep with chemicals used for the softening of animal skins, and work in improperly run mining facilities where explosions and other accidents are a common occurrence.

Career preparation has historically been used to justify forced labor prison systems around the world. In China, although this argument was used, career preparation was minimal until recently. Following release, the skills acquired within the Laogai prison (i.e. ditch-digging or manure-spreading) do not often lead to desirable employment. Inmates who entered the Laogai system with marketable skills were often assigned jobs utilizing these skills within the prison complex. Doctors, for example, were doctors within the Laogai camp often receiving preferential treatment, larger amounts of food, similar to the cadre, and a bed. "Inmates rarely leave with any new skills unless the training fits the camp's enterprising needs." More recently however, programs have been introduced to train prisoners in useful trades.

While there are many types of Laogai complexes, most enterprises are farms, mines, or factories. There are, according to the Chinese government, "approximately 200 different kinds of Laogai products that are exported to international markets". "A quarter of China's tea is produced in Laogai camps; 60 percent of China's rubber-vulcanizing chemicals are produced in a single Laogai camp in Shengyang ... one of the largest steel-pipe factories in the country is a Laogai camp ... " One camp alone, Ziangride, harvests more than 22,000 metric tons of grain every year. Dulan County prisoners have planted over 400,000 trees.

The conditions in these camps are considered extremely harsh by most of the world's cultures. However, the Chinese government considers Laogai to be effective in controlling prisoners and furthering China's economy. According to Mao Zedong, "The Laogai facilities are one of the violent component parts of the state machine. Laogai facilities of all levels are established as tools representing the interests of the proletariat and the people's masses and exercising dictatorship over a minority of hostile elements originating from exploiter classes."

== Estimated number of deaths ==
The estimated number of deaths in laogai varies substantially among authors on the subject:

- In 1997, human rights activist and Laogai Research Foundation creator Harry Wu put the death toll from 1949 to 1997 at 15 million.
- In 1991, political scientist Rudolph Rummel puts the number of forced labor "democides" at 15,720,000, excluding "all those collectivized, ill-fed and clothed peasants who would be worked to death in the fields".
- In 1997, Jean-Louis Margolin estimated in The Black Book of Communism that 20 million deaths resulted from high mortality rates in laogai. Margolin's calculation assume a yearly imprisoned population of 10 million people and a yearly mortality rate of 5%. If camps operated from roughly 1949 to 1980, that yields about 15.5 million dead.
- In 2005, linguist Jung Chang and historian Jon Halliday estimated in Mao: The Unknown Story that deaths in prisons and labor camps "could well amount to 27 million" during Mao's rule. In 2005, Jin Xiaoding negatively described Chang and Halliday's logic as a "magic formula" that simply multiplies 27 (years of Mao's rule) by 10 million (assumed camp population) by 10% (assumed yearly mortality rate) to obtain 27 million dead, with no discussion of responsibility or other data. Charlie Hore called this method "guessing". Chang and Halliday say that inmates were subjected to back-breaking labor in the most hostile wastelands, and that executions and suicides by any means (like diving into a wheat chopper) were commonplace.

== See also ==
- Penal system in China
  - Xinjiang re-education camps
- Sweatshop
