= Port of Tianjin =

Port in Northern China

Port of Tianjin 天津港
- Logo of the Port of Tianjin
- Interactive map of Port of Tianjin 天津港

Location
- Country: People's Republic of China
- Location: Tianjin
- Coordinates: 38°58′33″N 117°47′15″E
- UN/LOCODE: CNTXG or CNTSN (formerly CNTJP/CNTGU)

Details
- Opened: 1860 (Port of Tanggu); October 17, 1952 (Tianjin Xingang)
- Operated by: Tianjin Port Group Ltd
- Owned by: Tianjin State-owned Assets Supervision and Administration Commission
- Type of Harbor: Deep-water Seaport/Riverport
- Land area: 121 km^{2}
- Size: 260 km^{2} (470 km^{2} total jurisdictional area)
- No. of berths: 217; Production Berths: 140 (2010)
- Employees: 20,000 (2008)
- Chairman: Yu Rumin
- World Port Index Number: 60190
- Nautical Charts: 94363/0 (NGA/NIMA); 2653/4 (Admiralty); 11773/4(Chinese)

Statistics
- Annual cargo tonnage: 457 million tonnes (2025)
- Annual container volume: 20.81 million TEU (2025)
- Value of cargo: 197.249 billion USD (2011)
- Passenger traffic: 110,000 cruiser passengers (2012)
- Annual revenue: 21.5 billion RMB (2011)
- Net income: 1.678 billion RMB (2011)
- Website http://www.ptacn.com

The Port of Tianjin (Tianjin Gang, Chinese: 天津港; pinyin: tiānjīn gǎng), formerly known as the Port of Tanggu, is the largest port in Northern China and the main maritime gateway to Beijing. The name "Tianjin Xingang" (Chinese: 天津新港; pinyin: tiānjīn xīngǎng; lit. 'Tianjin New Port'), which strictly refers to the main seaport area, is sometimes used to refer to the whole port as well.

The port is on the western shore of the Bohai Bay, centered on the estuary of the Haihe River, 170 km southeast of Beijing and 60 km east of Tianjin city. It is the largest man-made port in mainland China and one of the largest in the world. It covers 121 square kilometers of land surface, with over 31.9 kilometers of quay shoreline and 151 production berths at the end of 2010.

Tianjin Port handled 500 million tonnes of cargo and 13 million TEU of containers in 2013, making it the world's fourth largest port by throughput tonnage and the ninth in container throughput. The port trades with more than 600 ports in 180 countries and territories around the world. It is served by over 115 regular container lines run by 60 liner companies, including all the top 20 liners. Expansion through the turn of the twenty-first century was enormous, going from 30 million tonnes of cargo and 490,000 TEU in 1993 to well beyond 400 million tonnes and 10 million TEU in 2012. 550–600 Mt of throughput capacity was expected by 2015. The large volume of port traffic and high urban population makes Tianjin a large-port megacity, the largest type of port-city in the world.

The port is part of the Binhai New Area district of Tianjin Municipality, the main special economic zone of Northern China; it lies directly east of the TEDA. The Port of Tianjin is at the core of the ambitious development program of the BNA; as part of that plan, the port aims to become the primary logistics and shipping hub of Northern China.

On 12 August 2015, at least two explosions within 30 seconds of each other occurred at a container storage station at the Port of Tianjin in the Binhai New Area of Tianjin, China. The cause of the explosions was not immediately known, but initial reports pointed to an industrial accident. Chinese state media said that at least the initial blast was from unknown hazardous materials in shipping containers at a plant warehouse owned by Ruihai Logistics, a firm specializing in handling hazardous materials.

== Location and layout ==
Location of the Port of Tianjin

The Port of Tianjin is on the coast of Tianjin Municipality, in the former county of Tanggu, on the coast between the estuaries of the Haihe to the south and the New Yongding River to the north. To the west, the port borders the city of Tanggu (now the urban core of the Binhai New Area) and the TEDA. To the east, the port opens up to the Bohai Bay.

Tianjin Port is divided into nine port areas: the three core ("Tianjin Xingang") areas of Beijiang, Nanjiang, and Dongjiang around the Xingang fairway; the Haihe area along the river; the Beitang port area around the Beitangkou estuary; the Dagukou port area in the estuary of the Haihe River; and three areas under construction (Hanggu, Gaoshaling, and Nangang).

Map of the Port of Tianjin and its approaches

== Geophysical setting ==
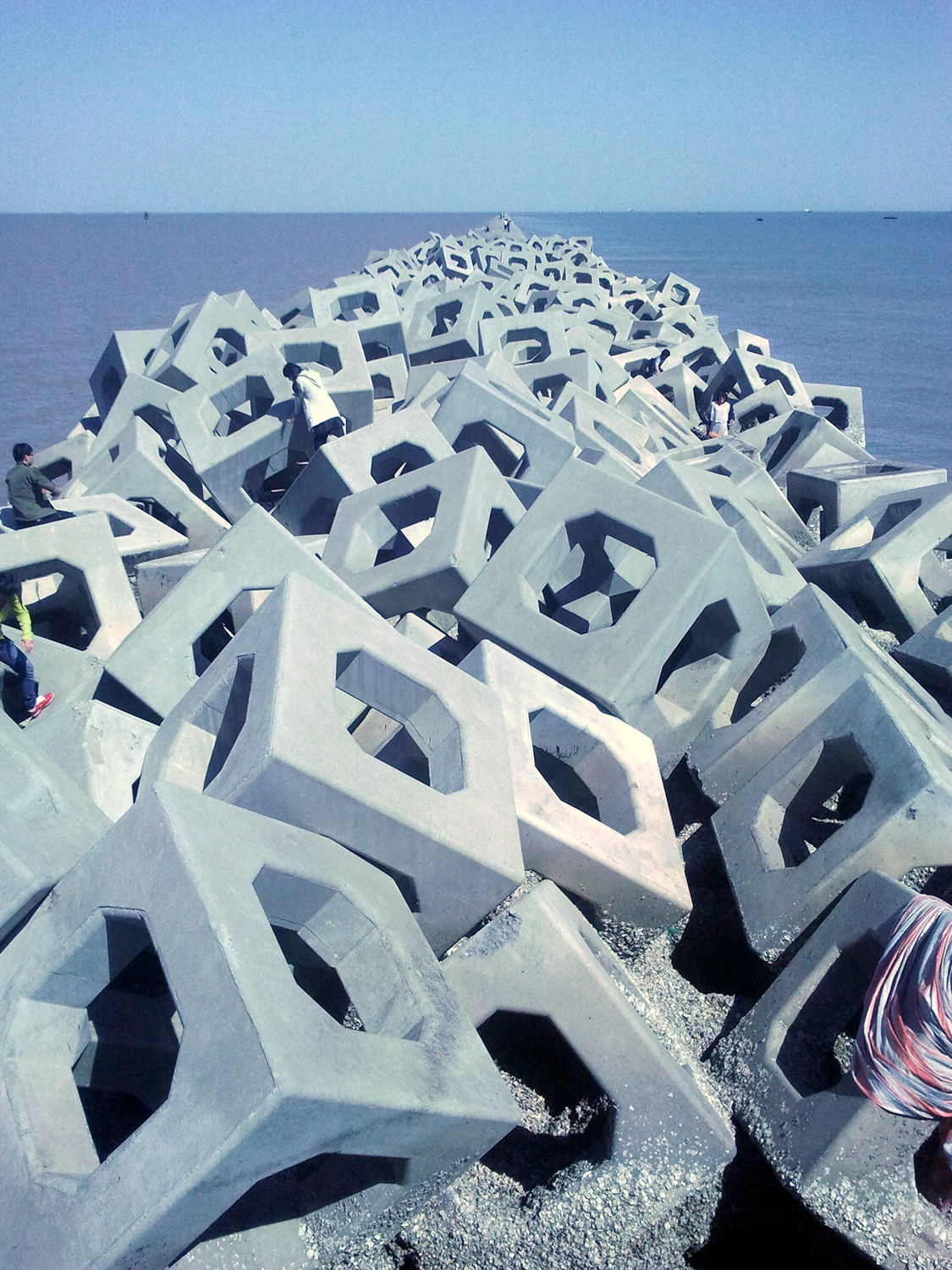
North Bulwark of Tianjin Port

The coastal area of the Tianjin municipality before development was dominated by mudflats, salt marshes (and salterns), and coastal shallows. This littoral zone is wide and slopes gently: The 0 meter isobath (the intertidal flats) extends to 3–8 kilometers from shore at a slope of 0.71–1.28%, the −5 meter isobath extends 14–18 kilometers from shore, and the −10 meter isobath reaches 22–36 kilometers from shore. These features make deep water navigation dependent on extensive dredging; it also means that land reclamation is a cost-effective option for construction. Tianjin Port is thus, by necessity, largely man-made through dredging and reclamation.

== History ==
The lower course and estuary of the Haihe is the main stem of a large navigable basin, as well as the westernmost seashore of the North China Plain. There have been major ports on the area at least since the late Eastern Han Dynasty. The river port at the junction of the Grand Canal served as both an inland port and seaport supplying the northeast border of Chinese states. Since 1153, it was the critical supply hub for what is now Beijing.

However, it was not until after the conclusion of the Second Opium War in 1860 that the port of Tanggu became an important transshipment center, allowing oceangoing ships to lighten their cargoes to cross the very shallow sandbar barring the entrance to Haihe, the Taku Bar (or 大沽坝; the name of this barrier was often used by foreign powers to refer to the entire port).

After the Boxer Rebellion, the whole of Tanggu came under foreign occupation, and those foreign powers developed an extensive network of quays on the riverside. The capacity of the Tanggu and Tianjin river port was limited at first, so the Japanese occupation forces started, in 1940, the construction of the Tanggu Xingang seaport (later the Tianjin Xingang port) outside the river estuary. By the end of the war, the new port was incomplete, and damage during the Chinese Civil War left it unusable by the time of its capture in 1949.

The Communists reconstructed the Tanggu New Port slowly. On 17 October 1952, it reopened for traffic. At the time, the main channel was dredged to 6 meter depth, could handle ships of up to 7,000 DWT, and had an annual throughput of only 800,000 tonnes—less than 1/500 of present capacity. The port remained small throughout the Maoist era, although it pioneered the first container routes and dedicated container terminal in China.

The export boom that followed the post-1979 reform and opening up period put enormous pressure on the rickety port infrastructure of China. Congestion became serious enough to force reform by the central government. On 1 June 1984, the Port of Tianjin was transferred from direct control of the Ministry of Communications to a "dual" system of shared central and local control.

Annual Throughput of the Port of Tianjin 1990–2011

Production then increased in leaps and bounds. In 1988, throughput passed the 20 million tonnes milestone, and in the ten years starting from 1993, annual throughput growth averaged 10 million tonnes every year. In December 2001, the port was the first port in Northern China to reach the 100 million tonnes mark. In 2004, it reached 200 million tonnes; in 2007, 300 million tonnes; and in 2010, 400 million tonnes. The container handling capacity of the port increased from 0.4 million TEU in 1992 to 2.4 million TEU in 2002, 7.1 million TEU in 2007, and more than 10 million TEU in 2010.

The structure of the port also changed. In 1992, Tianjin Port Storage and Transportation Company was made into a joint stock company under the full ownership of the Tianjin Port Bureau. In 1996, it was converted into the Tianjin Port Holdings Company (TPC) and listed in the Shanghai stock market. In 1997, Tianjin Development Holdings, which owned the container-handling assets of the Port, was listed in Hong Kong. Its port assets were later spun out as the Tianjin Port Development Company (TPD) and listed in the Hong Kong exchange in 2006.

The PTA delayed corporatization to steer the passing of the 11th five-year development plan for the port. The transition was only completed on 3 June 2004 when the PTA became the last major port authority in China to become a corporation: the Tianjin Port (Group) Company (天津港(集团)有限公司, or TPG by its English acronym).

The 2008 financial crisis greatly affected Chinese ports as they depended heavily on foreign trade flows. The Tianjin Port did better than average due to its diversification: while container business plummeted, bulk trade (in particular iron ore) remained strong. Nevertheless, the crisis hit profits hard, and it convinced the Tianjin government to reorganize and streamline the structure of the Port, which they did in 2009 by having TPD (the smaller operator, but one with the useful foreign registration and access to foreign capital markets) take over TPC. Simultaneously, ownership of TPD was transferred from Tianjin Development Holdings (a subsidiary of the Tianjin Ministry of Commerce) to TPG. By the time the merger was concluded, on 4 February 2010, all operations in the Tianjin Port had been consolidated under TPG.

The Port of Tianjin was adversely affected by a large industrial-scale accident in 2015. On 12 August 2015, a series of explosions took place at a port chemical storage facility in Binhai, causing 173 deaths and nearly 800 injuries. The blast had the equivalent of 800 metric tonnes of ammonium nitrate or a 2.9 magnitude earthquake, according to the China Earthquake Networks Center. Eight other people have remained missing.

The port is part of the Maritime Silk Road that runs from the Chinese coast to the south via the southern tip of India to Mombasa, from there through the Red Sea via the Suez Canal to the Mediterranean, from there to the Upper Adriatic region to the northern Italian hub of Trieste with its rail connections, and finally to Central Europe and the North Sea.

== Port fairway ==
The Tianjin Xingang Fairway is divided into the Main Shipping Channel, the Chuanzhadong Channel, and the Northern Branch Channel. The Dagusha Channel and the Haihe river channel are separate fairways with slightly different regulations.

=== Anchorages ===
Tianjin Port has six main anchorage areas and two temporary anchorages. All anchorages are designated for all functions—berth waiting, quarantine, inspection and pilotage—but provide little shelter from weather or rough seas. Anchored vessels are advised to keep five cables of clearance, as anchor dragging is common (up to 5–10 nautical miles in a day in winter due to drifting ice).

=== Shiplocks and tidal barriers ===
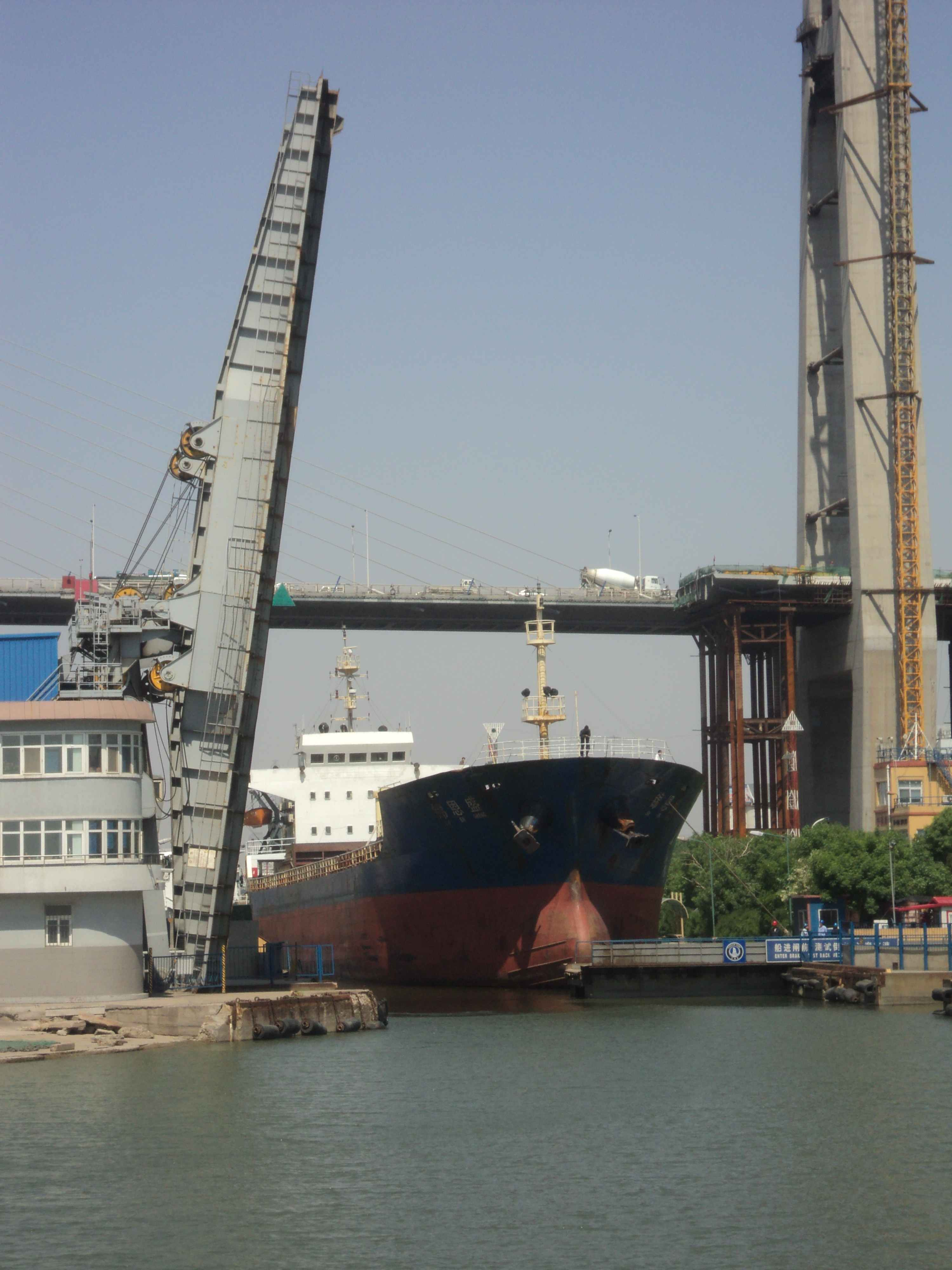
A ship passing from the Haihe into the Xingang seaport through the Xingang Shiplock

The Haihe river channel is separated from the sea channels by three structures:

- The Xingang Shiplock (Chinese: 新港船闸; pinyin: xīngǎng chuánzhá) in the northern side of the estuary is the main shipping route into the Haihe area.
- The Haihe Tidal Barrier (Chinese: 海河防潮闸; pinyin: hǎihé fángcháozhá), built in 1958, and last refurbished in 1999, serves as a dam, flood control sluice, and tide surge protection for the Haihe river mouth.
- The Tanggu Fishing Boat Lock (Chinese: 塘沽渔船闸; pinyin: tánggū yúchuánzhá) is at the western end of the channel between Donggu and Lanjingdao Island. In 2011, it started to be rebuilt to allow for larger road traffic between Donggu and Lanjingdao.

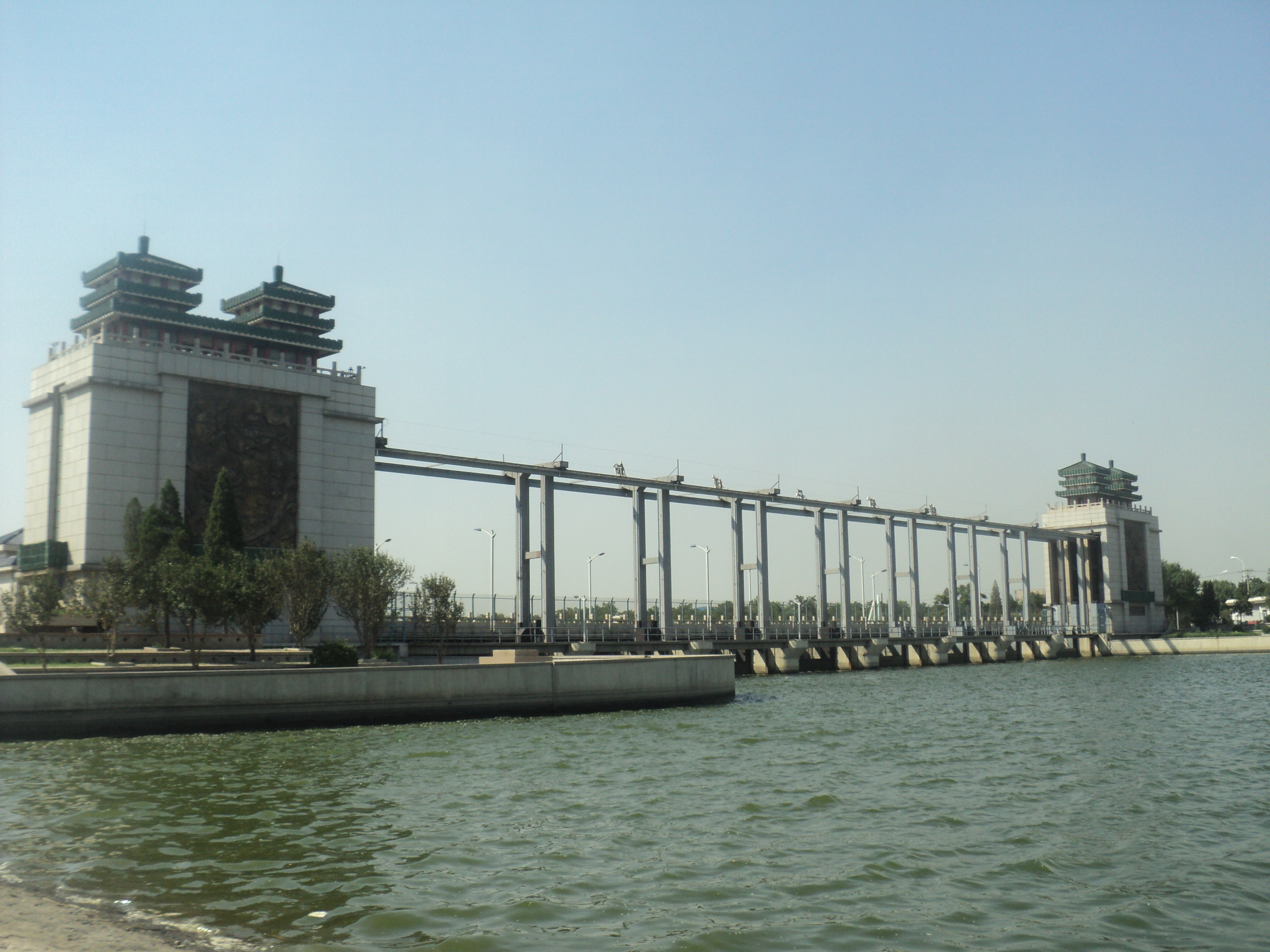
The Haihe Second Barrier from the east

The final hydraulic structure of the Tianjin Port is the Haihe Second Barrier (Chinese: 海河二道闸; pinyin: hǎihé èrdàozhá) at Dongnigucun, in the Jinnan district. The Haihe Second Barrier is also an open-type sluice barrier, with eight vertical-rising gates allowing an average flow of 1200 cubic meters per second. The barrier, opened in July 1984, closes ship traffic upriver into Tianjin city proper, and its erection resulted in the abandonment of 29.3 kilometers of navigable channel.

== Port governance ==
=== State regulation and supervision ===
The Port of Tianjin falls under the supervisory and regulatory purview of the Tianjin Municipality People's Government. The 2004 incorporation of the Tianjin Port Authority into TPG formally divested the group of its role as Port Regulator, which passed to the Tianjin Transportation and Port Authority (天津市交通运输和港口管理局, or TTPA), formerly the Tianjin Transport Commission. The TTPA implements state policy on port work; drafts local policies, by-laws, and regulations; and licenses, audits, and issues certifications to businesses operating in the port, in particular to ship terminals. The TTPA supervises and manages compliance to all laws and regulations regarding environmental protection, service compliance, pilotage, maintenance of port infrastructure, and handling of dangerous goods and disinfection in all terminals and storage areas.

The Tianjin Municipality People's Government Port Services Office (天津市人民政府口岸服务办公室) was set up in May 2009 to streamline port operations, in particular customs and inspection clearance procedures.

Harbormaster powers for the Port of Tianjin are mostly vested on the Tianjin Maritime Safety Bureau (天津海事局), which is the local agency of the China Maritime Safety Administration.

The Port of Tianjin falls under the jurisdiction of the Tianjin Maritime Court for all matters of national and international Maritime law, including all forms of maritime contracts, torts, and offenses.

=== Inspection and clearance ===
Inbound ships, cargo, and personnel require clearance by four main government bodies: China Customs for customs declaration, Border Inspection for migration formalities, China Inspection and Quarantine for quarantine and fumigation, and the MSA for ship and crew safety regulations. Obtaining clearance from these so-called One Customs Three Inspections (一关三检) used to be a protracted process; one of the continued foci of port reform is to speed up the clearance procedures and reduce their (still significant) burden.

=== Port management ===
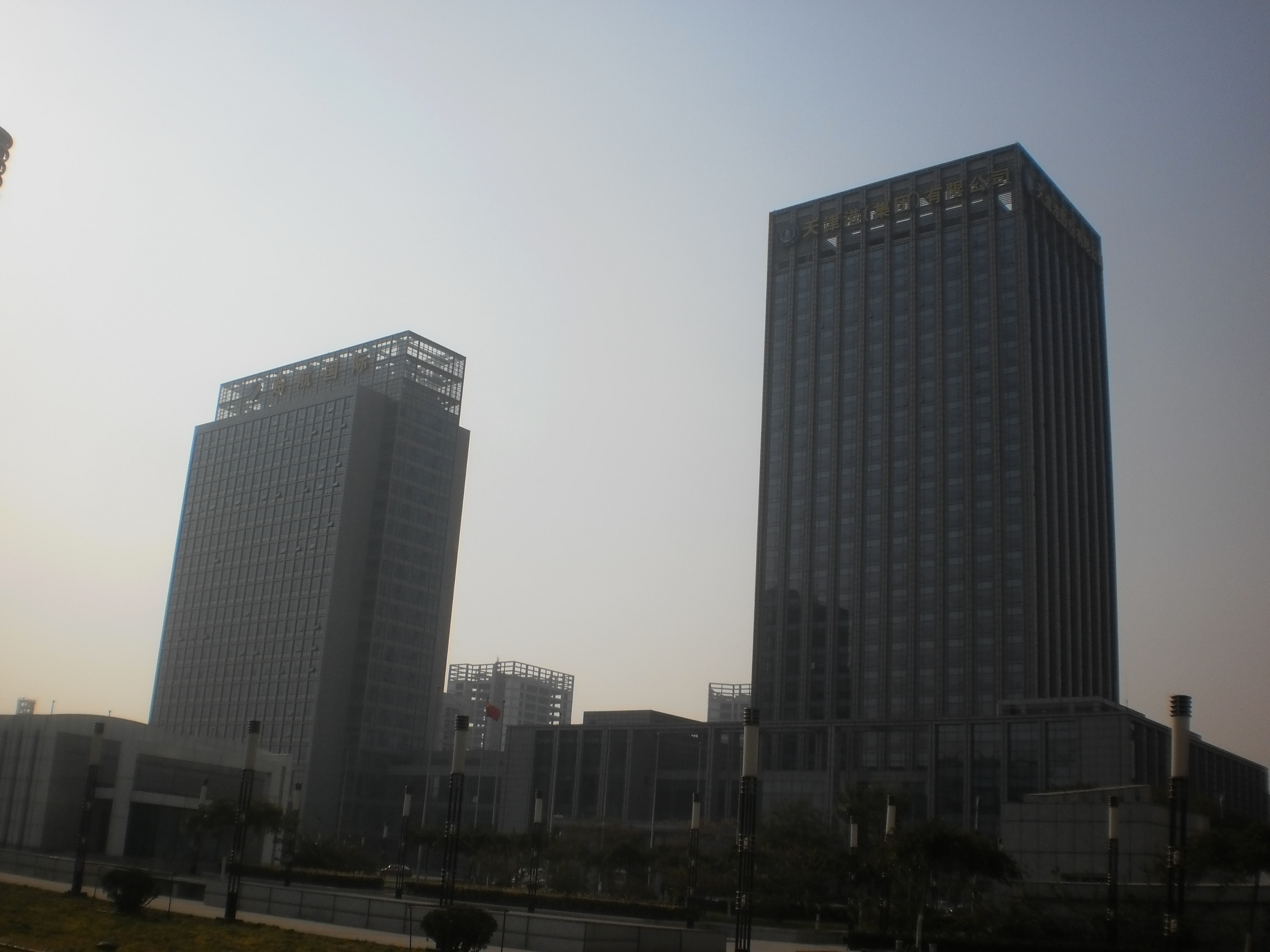
The new headquarters building for the Tianjin Port Group, next to the Yihang International Building

Tianjin Port Group (TPG) is both the main Port Operator and Port Landowner. It also retains some of the old Port Authority's supervisory functions. TPG is the holding company and Ultimate Controlling Party for most of the Tianjin Port operating units, and its affiliates and subordinate units run most aspects of port operation. The Dagukou port area is (at present) run separately by the Tianjin Lingang Port Group Company (天津临港港务集团有限公司) owned by the Tianjin Lingang Economic Area Administrative Committee (of which TPG is a part).

TPG also serves as Port Landlord, providing basic municipal services (including roads, power, water and sewerage) and other services, extending from construction materials to printing services to the port's tenant operators. In this role, TPG maintains quasi-municipal authority over port areas. Finally, as with all Chinese state-owned enterprises, the control and coordination role of the local Communist Party units is significant, as is the common cross-sharing of personnel among related units.

== Traffic management and navigational safety ==
=== Area procedures and traffic rules ===
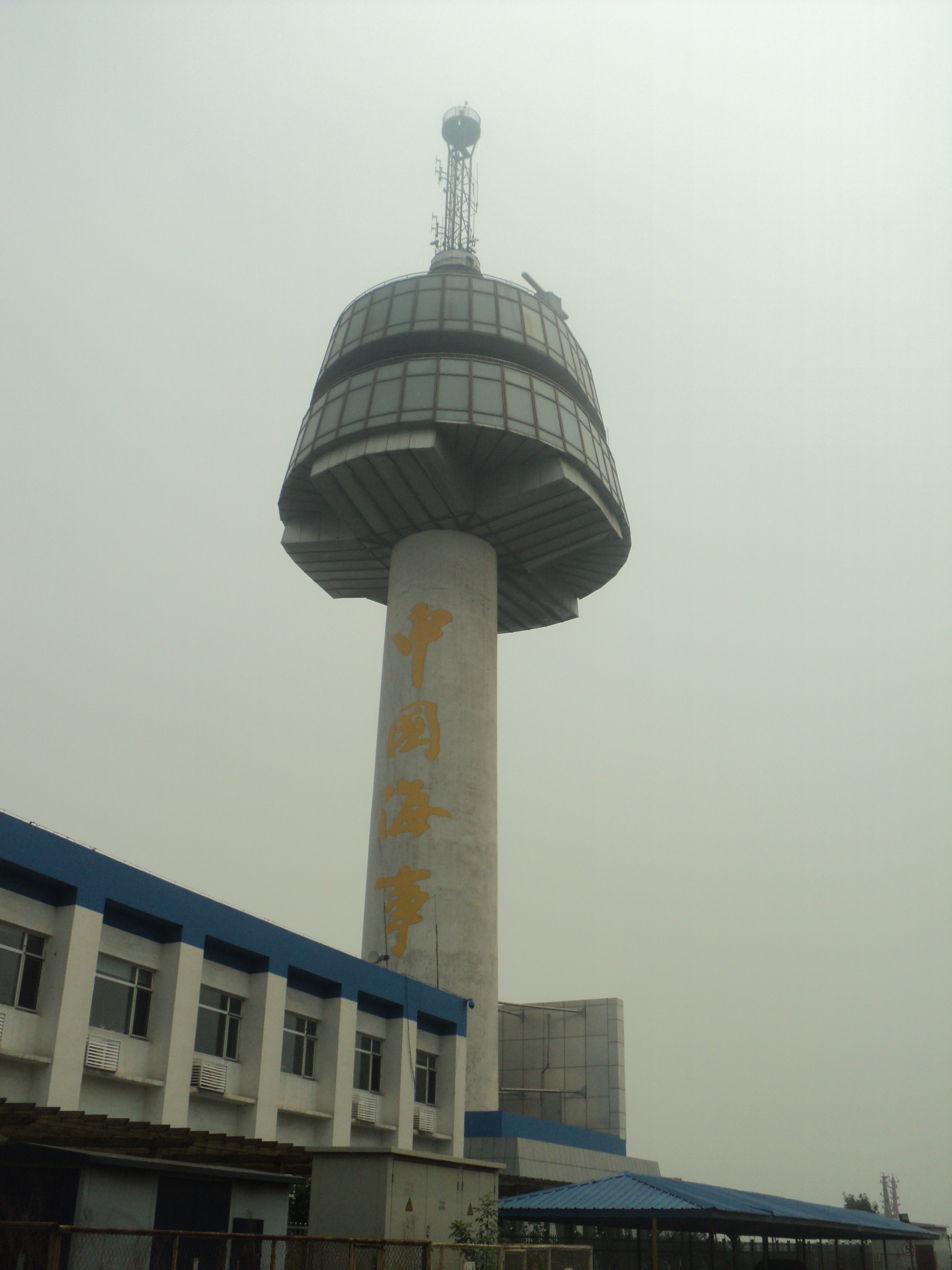
The VTS Tower houses the traffic control center for the Port and its approaches

The Vessel Traffic Service Center (天津船舶交通管理中心) of the MSA provides traffic control, navigation assistance, and local communication to all vessels in the Port's fairway, anchorages, and berths. The VTS Center is located in an 88 meter tall control tower at the eastern end of the Dongtudi (East Pier) and has two subordinate monitoring stations at Dongjiang and Lingang. Its control area extends 20 nautical miles (37 kilometers) from the tower. Compliance with the VTSC's authority is mandatory, and all ships must maintain watch on its VHF channel (channel 9) while on the port area. On the Haihe, both VHF 09 and 71 must be on watch. (Note: Pilot "stations" are teams specialized in a set of berths rather than distinct physical posts, as all three are located in the same building.)

=== Aids to navigation ===
The Tianjin Port's aids to navigation (AtoN) system is fairly dense and growing rapidly. The MSA Beihai Navigational Security Center's Tianjin Aids to Navigation Office (北海航海保障中心天津航标处) is responsible for the maintenance of all navigational aids within the Tianjin area. In 2004, the AtoN office controlled 141 navigational aids in the Tianjin jurisdiction, including three lighthouses, 12 light beacons, 22 lead markers, 44 day beacons, 55 light buoys, one NDB station, one RBN/DGPS station, three radar transponders, two large AtoN ships, two small AtoN ships, and one survey ship operating from two wharves.

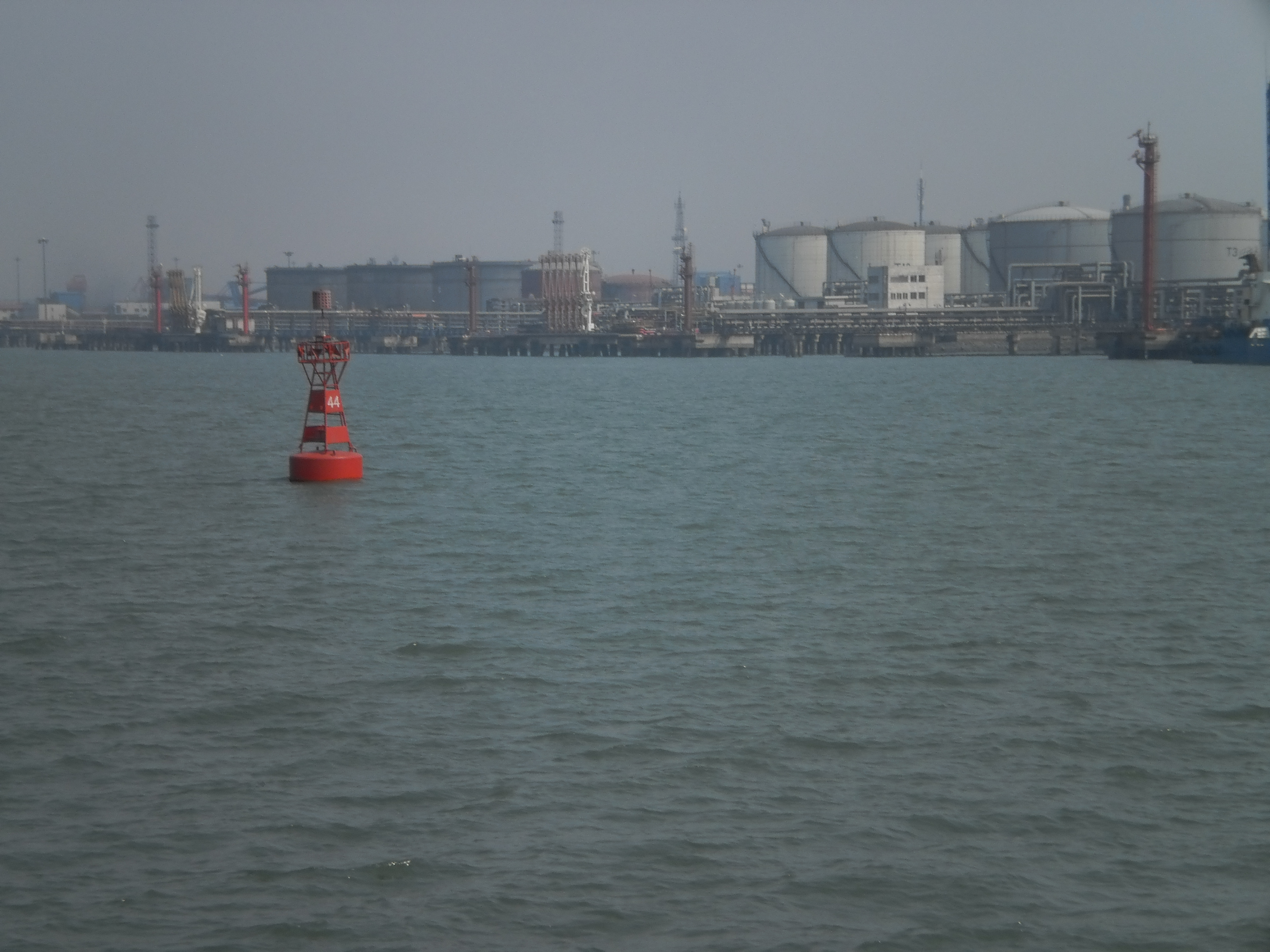
Main Channel buoy 44 and Petrochemical Terminal

=== Weather monitoring and reporting ===
While the Port directly operates a number of hydro-meteorological stations (including tide gauges), weather forecasting is primarily the responsibility of the Tianjin Binhai New Area Weather Warning Center (天津市滨海新区气象预警中心), the local agency of the Tianjin Municipal Weather Bureau (天津市气象局). The Warning Center uses local (26 automatic weather stations in Binhai), national, and satellite data to forecast marine and port weather.

=== Maritime communication ===
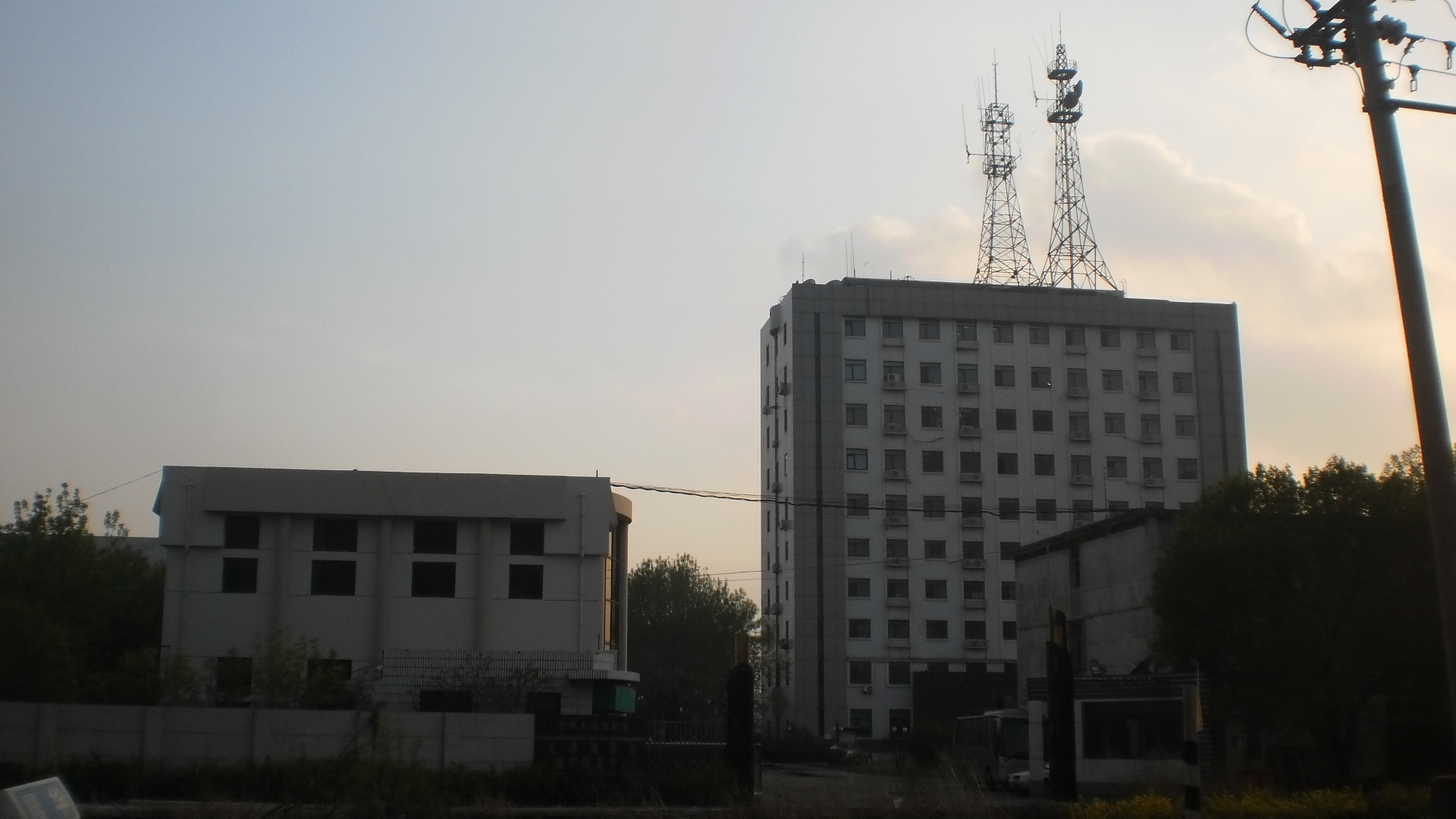
Tianjin Coastal Radio's Tanggu Station

The Beihai Navigational Security Center's Tianjin Communications and Information Center (北海航海保障中心天津通信中心) runs the Tianjin Coastal Station (天津海岸电台, Callsign: XSV; Call: Tianjin Radio; MMSI 004121100). The Station is in charge of the communication obligations of the Global Maritime Distress Safety System in the Port's jurisdiction, supports the SAR Center's communication needs, and supports the MSA's duties of coordination and communications.

=== SAR operations and emergency response ===
The primary SAR coordination agency is the Tianjin Maritime Search and Rescue Center (天津市海上搜救中心), with responsibility for coordinating all SAR activities in Port waters.

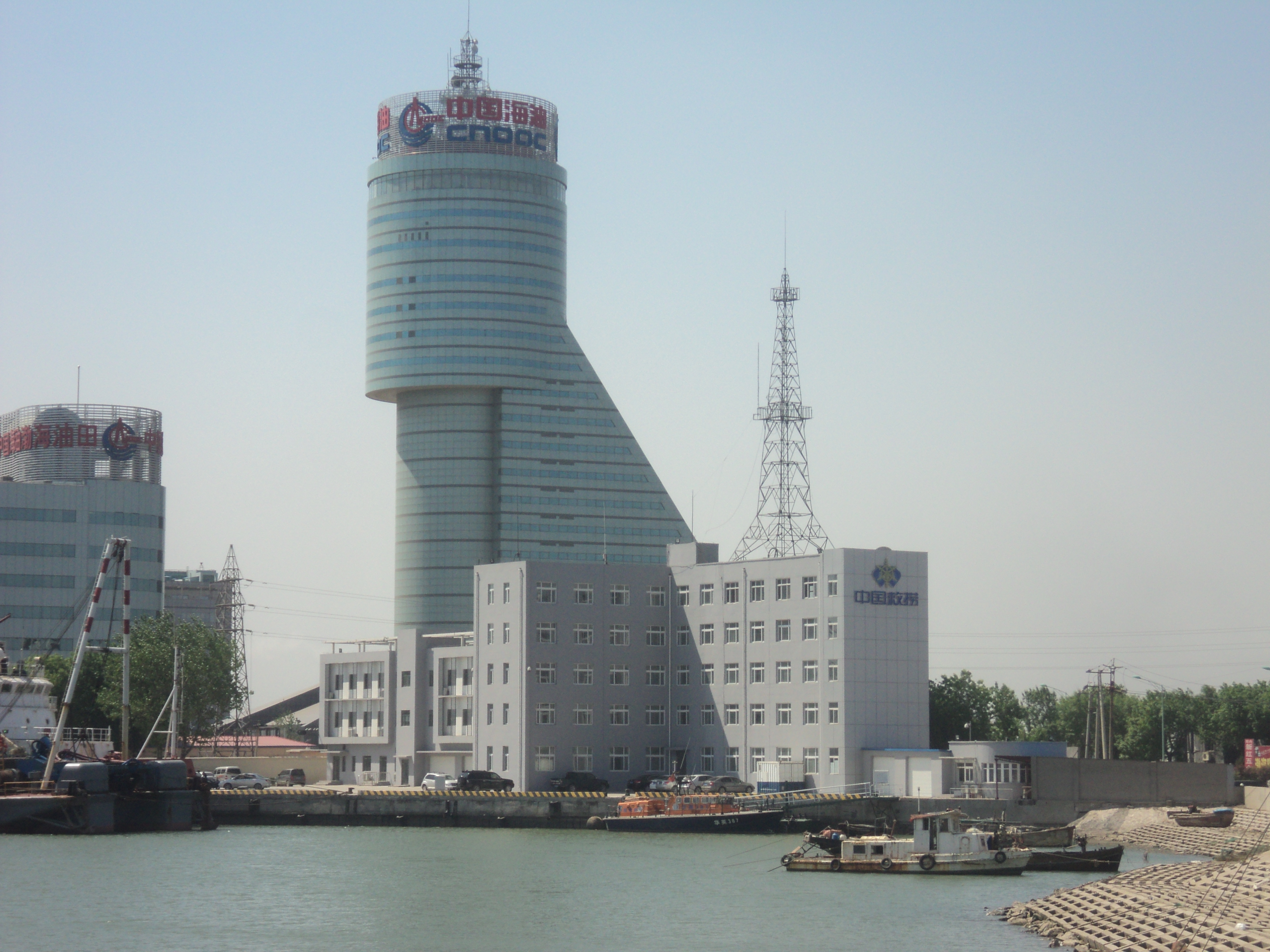
Tianjin Search and Rescue Base; in the background is the CNOOC Bohai Oil Building A

The Tianjin Search and Rescue Base is one of the six rescue bases of the China Rescue and Salvage Beihai Bureau, which is the frontline rescue and salvage force of the Ministry of Transport.

Tianjin Rescue Base keeps three dynamic standby stations, normally with the following units:

1. Search and Rescue Base's Wharf: one Fast Rescue Boat (Huaying 387) and one rescue tug.
2. Dagukou Anchorage: one 1940 kW Rescue Ship (Beihaijiu 169)
3. Beihai 2nd Point (10 nautical miles south of Caofeidian, 38º50′N / 118º25′E) : one 1940 kilowatt Rescue Ship (Beihaijiu 115)

Tianjin Port PSB Fire Services Detachment (天津港公安局消防支队) holds the fire-fighting and fire prevention duties for both the land and water areas of the Port.

The Tianjin Port Hospital (天津港口医院) is the primary provider of emergency medical care in the port. It is a 314-bed comprehensive hospital, owned by TPG, that is specially licensed to deal with infectious disease outbreaks, quarantine, and maritime accident trauma: its orthopedic trauma department is especially well ranked nationally.

Tianjin MSA is the Port's "National Operational Contact Point" pursuant to MARPOL, and must be contacted (VHF 9) in all incidents of shipborne harmful substance spills.

The State Oceanic Administration has overlapping authority regarding spills and pollution, usually concentrated on oil platform and pipeline incidents.

== Law enforcement ==
The maritime governance regime in China is peculiar in its multiplicity of actors and apparent duplication of labor. Five major agencies (MSA, SOA, CCG, FLEC, and GAC), plus the local People's Police and other local units, divide maritime and coastal law enforcement, as well as safety and administrative duties, with much overlap in formal remits. These agencies' responsibilities reflect the functional jurisdiction of their parent ministries, and their operational emphases fit those jurisdictions. Only the Coast Guard (Maritime Police) patrol vessels are armed gunboats, and the Guard has first line jurisdiction in gendarmerie missions such as terrorism, piracy, and serious crimes.

=== People's Police units ===
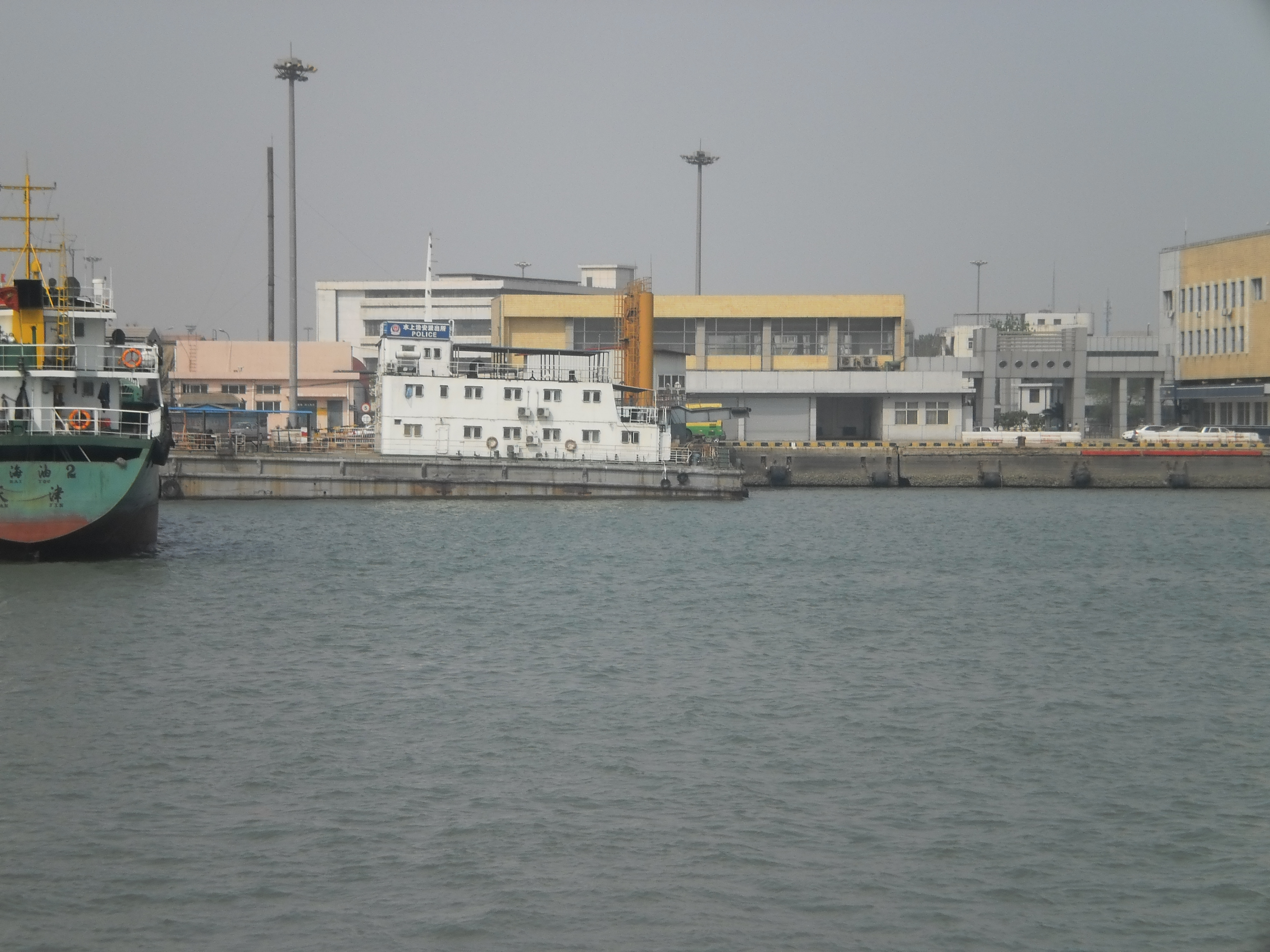
The Tianjin Port PSB Floating Station, moored at the Passenger Terminal.

The Tianjin Port Public Security Bureau (天津港公安局) is one of the fourteen branch offices of the Tianjin Public Security Bureau, with sub-bureau status. It is responsible for public order, law enforcement, criminal investigation, road traffic control, and fire safety and firefighting.

The Tianjin Port PSB has its own water police unit running its own patrol boats, which are berthed on a floating pontoon station (天津港公安局水上治安派出所) built on a converted floating crane currently located on the K1 berth of the Tianjin Port Passenger Terminal.

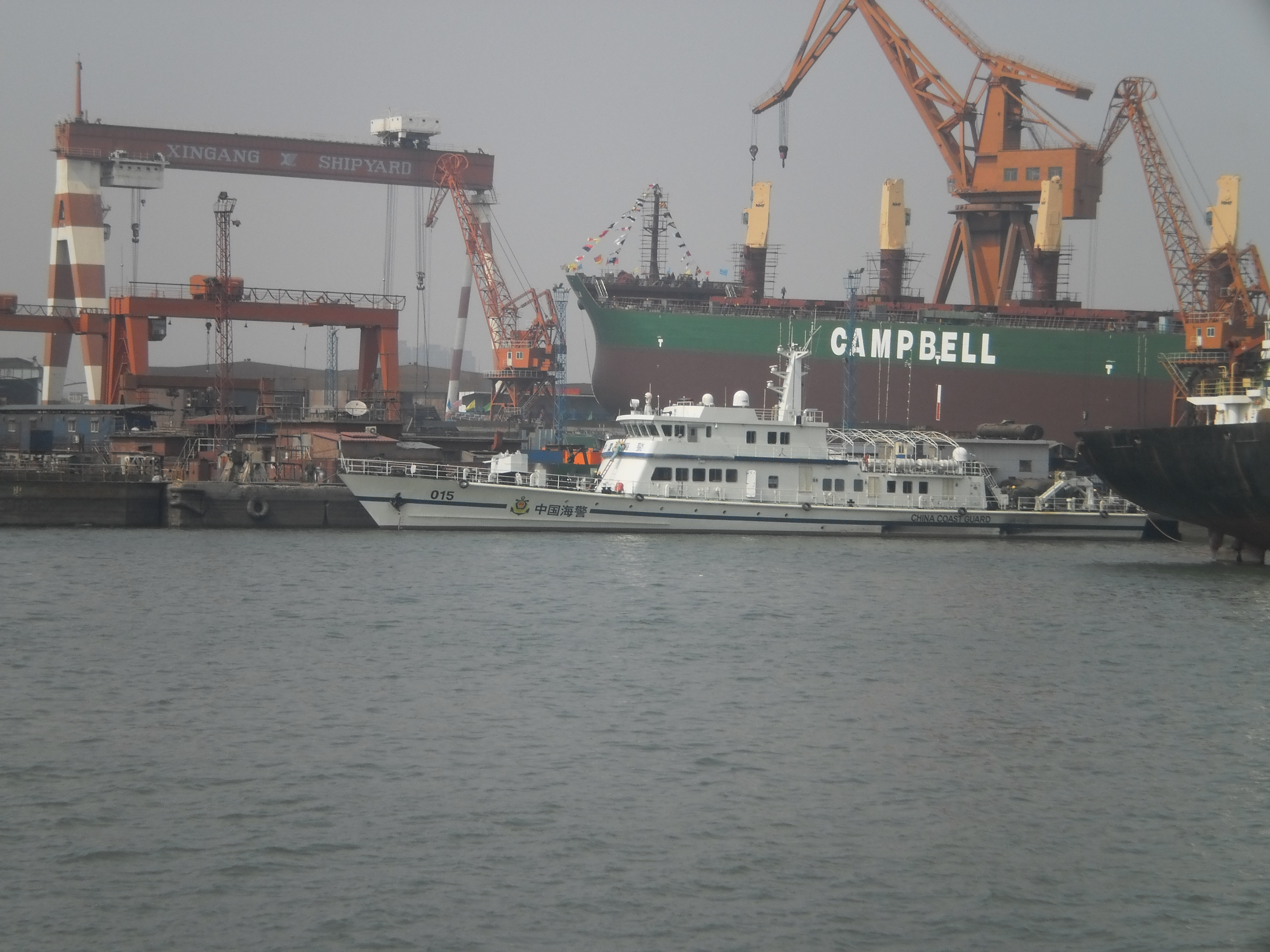
China Coast Guard cutter at the Xingang Shipyard

Border Protection: the Public Security Border Troops (公安边防部队) are a gendarmerie force under control of the MPS in charge of border protection and security. The border guards' local ground unit is the Binhai New Area Public Security Border Protection Detachment (滨海新区公安边防支队).

The Tianjin Customs Anti-Smuggling Bureau (天津海关缉私局), usually called the Anti-Smuggling Police (天津海关缉私警察), is a People's Police unit under the dual command of the MPS and the GAC. It is the main body engaged in control, prevention, and investigation of customs fraud, duty evasion, smuggling (including cultural goods, drugs, dangerous materials, etc.).

=== Other law enforcement bodies ===
The law enforcement arms of the MSA are the Tianjin Maritime Public Security Bureau (天津海事公安局) and the Tianjin MSA Law Enforcement Patrol Flotilla (天津海事局巡查执法支队). The Tianjin Maritime PSB (not to be confused with the Tianjin Port Public Security Bureau) is responsible for maritime law enforcement and carries out marine accident and criminal investigations. The Patrol Flotilla deploys 11 patrol ships (hull numbers Haixun 05XX), which monitor and manage shipping traffic, maintain navigational order and safety, and cooperate on patrol, escort, and search and rescue missions as needed.

The Second Detachment of China Maritime Surveillance (中国海监第二支队) of the Tianjin Oceanic Administration has jurisdiction over the Bohai and Laizhou Bays and over all the coastal areas of Tianjin and Hebei. It monitors environmental damage, illegal use of sea resources, violation of maritime regulations, and damage to marine facilities.

The Tianjin Fisheries Management and Fishing Port Supervision and Management Office (天津市渔政渔港监督管理处) is a branch of the Tianjin Fisheries Bureau under the China Fisheries Law Enforcement Command Center (中国渔政指挥中心). It is in charge of enforcing fishing regulations, of controlling illegal, unreported and unregulated fishing (IUU), and of fishing navigational safety.

== Business structure ==
=== Ownership structure ===
The ownership structure of the Tianjin Port after the 2009 merger; green boxes are foreign-registered entities, while blue boxes are mainland-registered

The Port of Tianjin is a state-owned enterprise (SOE), run as an independent corporation, with separate finances and a commercial orientation. The Port Owner is the Tianjin Municipality People's Government (天津市人民政), through the Tianjin SASAC (天津国有资产监督管理委员会, or Tianjin State Assets Supervision and Administration Committee), which is the full owner of the Tianjin Port (Group) Company (TPG). TPG's board is appointed by the Tianjin government. TPG is the effective holding company and main Port Operator, and it owns or has a stake in the majority of the Port's various operating outfits.

Since the 2009 merger, TPG's main operating subsidiary is Tianjin Port Development (TPD), which in turn is the majority shareholder of Tianjin Port Holdings (TPC). TPG has been injecting operational assets to TPC for several years and, since 2009, to TPD (most recently the Shihua Crude Oil Terminal). This has created somewhat of a functional division. The listed TPD, directly or through TPC, controls all terminals and direct cargo-handling operations, while TPG still directly controls most of the utility, support, and ancillary units related to the Port and retains control of strategic planning. TPG is also a party in 53 joint ventures.

== Port operations ==
Tianjin Port Planning Map for 2030

The subsidiaries and partial ownership partners of TPG are involved in all facets of port operation, including stevedoring, shipping agency, cargo handling, storage and transportation, infrastructure management, communications and information services, financial services, power supply, real estate development, health care, personnel training, education, port security, transportation, fire protection, port facilities management, environmental management, etc.

The core activity of the Port is, naturally, cargo handling and processing. As a comprehensive port, it handles all sorts of cargo including dry and liquid bulk, general cargo, containers, vehicles, and passengers. Tianjin Port operates 365 days a year, 24 hours a day (on three shifts from 00:00–08:00, 08:00–16:00, and 16:00–24:00).

=== Port production ===
As of 2011, the Port had 217 berths (including service berths); 90 berths were capable of accommodating ships over 10,000 DWT. Of these, 72 could dock ships over 50,000 DWT; 30 over 100,000 DWT, 23 over 150,000 DWT, 5 over 200,000 DWT, and 2 over 300,000 DWT.

The Port's docking terminals are operated by autonomous companies that are mostly either fully owned by, or are joint ventures with, TPC or TPD. While the 2004 Port Law allowed full foreign ownership of port facilities, TPG is still the majority shareholder of all but a few of the Port's main terminals, excepting single-company (customs type II) terminals. Additional stevedoring personnel is provided by a number of labor services companies affiliated to various operators.

Secondary wharves tend to the service, supply, and maintenance ships that a complex port needs to function. These facilities range from temporary sand unloading wharves needed for construction to large bunkering wharves, workboat stations, and the bases of the various law enforcement agencies.

The Tianjin Port Group's Operations Department (天津港集团业务部) is in charge of coordinating the productive operation of the Port and must be informed of all ship movements and major operations. The production schedule (ship movement plan) is arranged by the TPG Dispatch Control Center (天津港集团生产调度指中心), in coordination with the wharf operators, the MSA, and the pilot center. The Dispatch Center organizes ship movements, tracks pilotage operations, and supervises terminal operations via real-time CCTV monitoring. The Dagukou port area has a separate dispatching center (天津临港经济区船舶调度指挥中心).

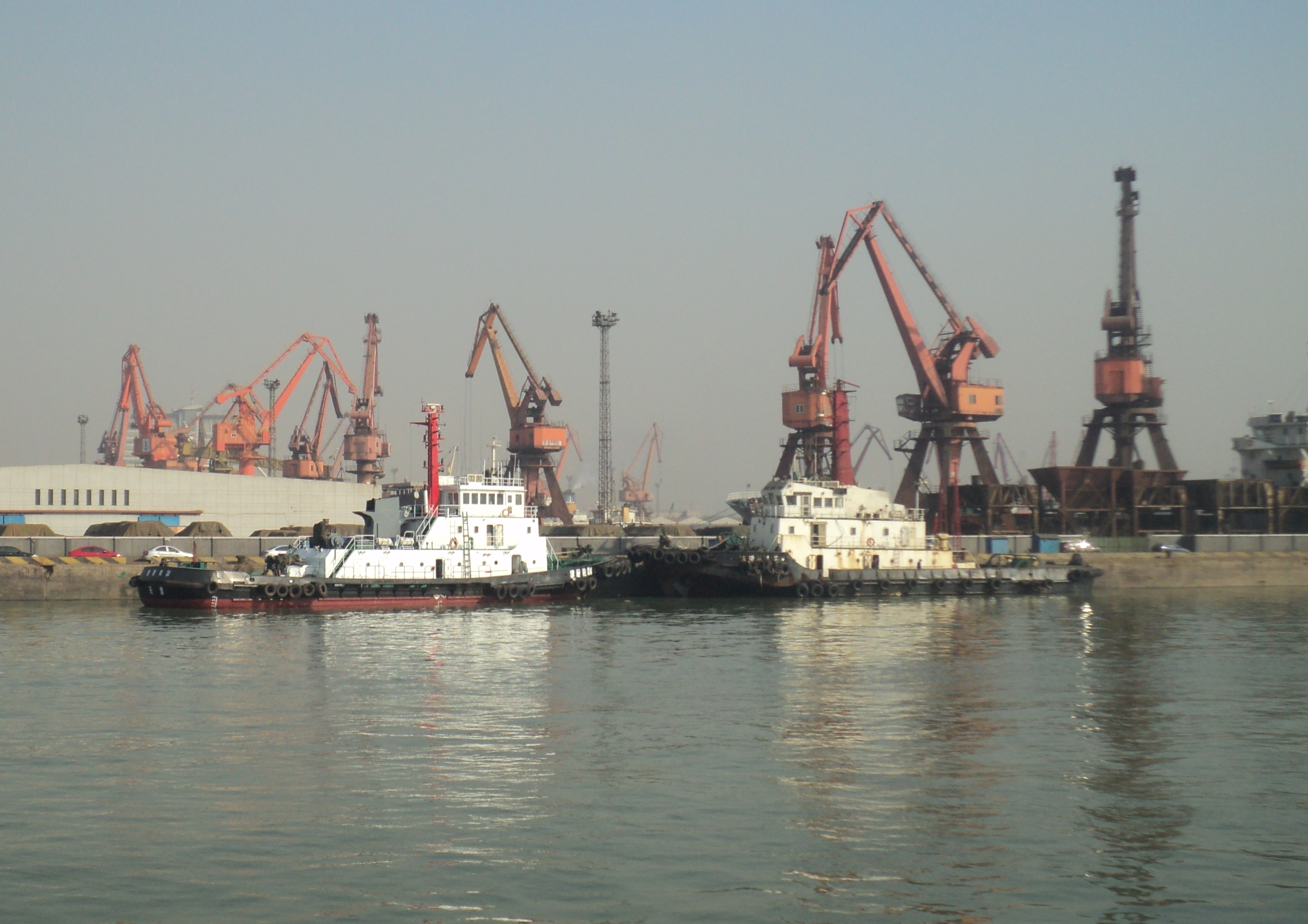
Two harbor tugs at the First Pier Tug Wharf

The main provider of harbor craft is the Tianjin Port Tug & Lighter Company. The TTLC operates the harbor tugs, fireboats, pilot boats, and other ancillary craft such as the crew boat Xinbinhai or the sightseeing boat Xinhaimen (used for inspection and visiting VIPs). The company operates 26 harbor tugs (between 2,600 HP and 6,000 HP of power), five pilot ships, seven other ancillary crafts, two floating cranes (120 tonnes and 200 tonnes capacity); and around three dozen lighters, the largest around 1,340 tonnes displacement. The Dagusha channel is served by a subsidiary company of TTLC, the Tianjin Lingang Tug Company (天津临港拖轮有限公司), which operates four tugboats.

CNOOC Bohai Oil maintains a flotilla of 110 offshore support vessels (OSV), many home-ported at Tianjin. These boats are available for emergency work under MSA authority. Two of CNOOC's floating cranes (800 tonnes and 500 tonnes) can be commercially engaged for harbor duty.

=== Port maintenance and construction ===
TPG operates as the port landlord and provides most utilities, municipal services, and ancillary services to the various port operators. The services it provides are very wide in scope, spanning everything from electrical power to construction materials to printing services. The main organ of TPG's landlord function is the Tianjin Port Facilities Management Company (天津港设施管理服务公司), which manages and maintains all municipal services—including roads, railroads, bridges, water, and sewerage—installs and maintains wharf equipment and other production material, provides municipal administration, and provides engineering consultancy services.

As an artificial port dependent on dredged channels susceptible to silting, continuous depth surveying is critical to the Port. Tianjin Port is the base of the Beihai Navigational Security Center's Tianjin Marine Survey and Charting Center (北海航海保障中心天津海事测绘中心) with responsibility for the hydrographic surveying, monitoring, fairway sounding, and charting of all waters and shipping channels in the Beihai (Northern Seas) area, which includes the Bohai and Yellow seas. As of 2011, the Hydrographic Brigade had 149 personnel, two survey ships (Haice 051 and Haice 0502), surveying equipment including ROVs, and UAVs for aerial surveying

The Tianjin Dredging Company (天津航道局) is the organic waterway management company of the Tianjin Port Group. As of January 2010, the TDC deployed 100 boats and had the largest dredging capacity of China with a capacity of 300 million cubic meters and more than 500,000 kilowatts of vessel power. Despite these numbers, the scale of fairway expansion and land reclamation in the Port means that several other construction companies operate large numbers of dredging vessels as well.

Dredging the Haihe Channel is the responsibility of the Tianjin Municipal Water Management Bureau (天津市水务局), which maintains both navigability and river flow capacity (set at 800 cubic meters). The Water Management dredgers operate from wharves at the Haihe Second Barrier and at the Haihe Tidal Barrier.

Routine icebreaking is usually handled by the Tug & Lighter Company. In case of ice emergencies, the MSA coordinates icebreaking patrols using heavy harbor tugs and dredges. During the frozen winter of 2010–11, the Port authorities estimated that there were 16 ships with icebreaking capabilities available, 10 of which belonged to the TTLC. CNOOC Bohai had 24 icebreakers, needed to clear offshore platforms, and also lent two larger icebreakers to the Port.

The Port's main construction and engineering outfit is CCCC First Harbor Engineering (中交第一航务工程局有限公司). Four subsidiary companies carry out all forms of project engineering and construction from roads to breakwaters. As of 2010, First Harbor Engineering First Company (the main boat outfit) had a fleet of 74 work vessels. As in the case of dredgers, the sheer scale of construction in the Port means that many other outfits deploy hundreds of vessels. As of 2008, there were 418 construction vessels operating at the Port, including 236 sand barges and fluvial workboats.

The Tianjin Research Institute for Water Transport Engineering is in charge of the technical supervision of most port engineering projects.

Commercial and residential property development in newly reclaimed or repurposed land is one of the four core "industries" of the Port. The Tianjin Port Real Estate Development Company (天津港地产发展有限公司), founded 2009, is now very active in developing both residential and commercial property on Port land.

=== Services and amenities ===
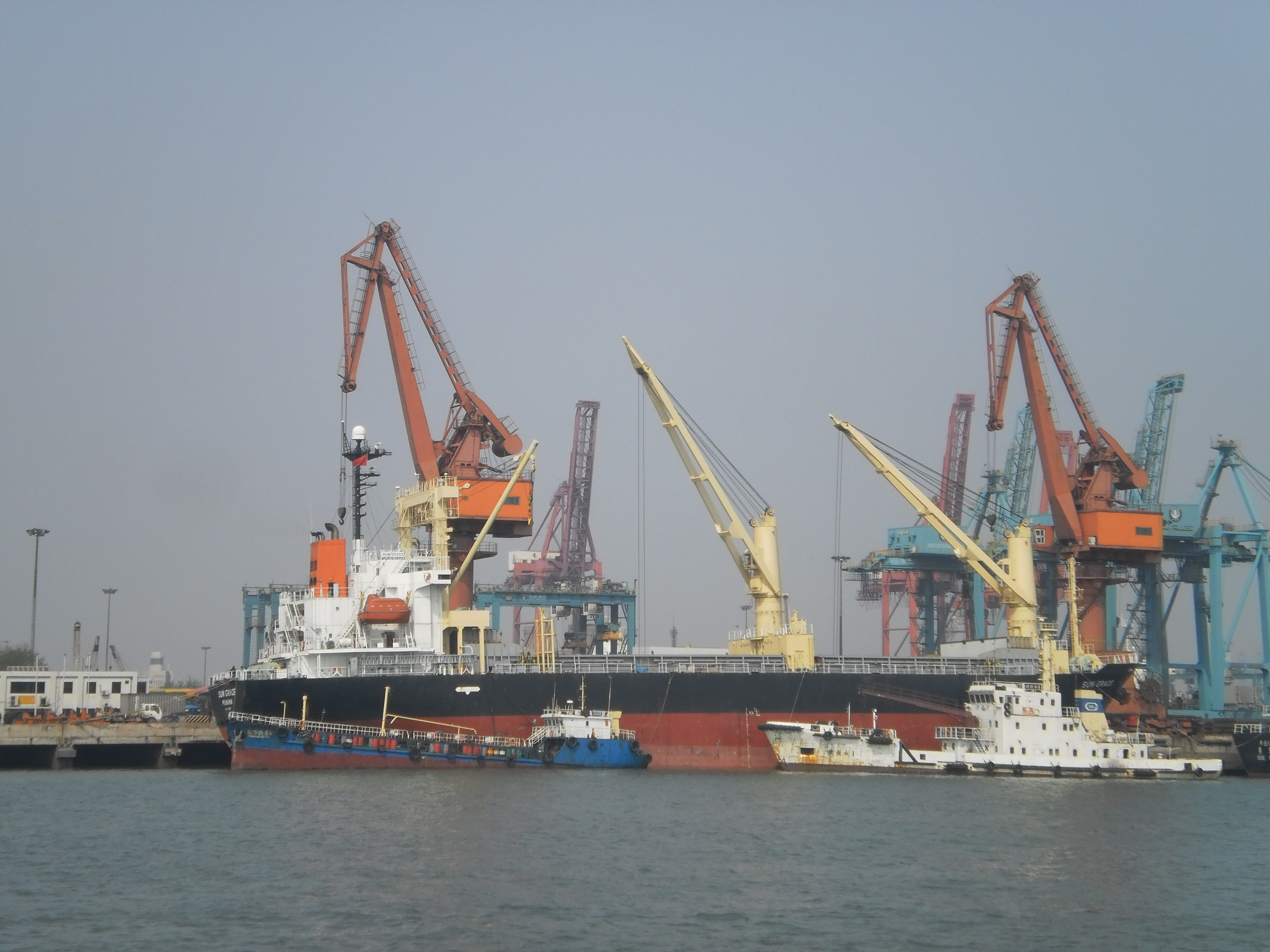
A water tender and a bunker tender resupplying a freighter at the First Stevedoring Co. wharf

The main bunker oil, lubricants, and water provider in Tianjin Port is Tianjin Chimbusco (中国船舶燃料供应天津公司). Chimbusco China had a monopoly on the supply of bonded bunker oil (i.e. for foreign vessels) in China until 2006. Tianjin Chimbusco (now a TPG subsidiary) retained its exclusive rights in Tianjin until 2009, and the end of the monopoly resulted in a black gold rush of competing bunkerage companies: Sinopec Zhoushan entered the Tianjin market in October 2010, followed in December 2010 by SinoBunker, and in June 2011, China Changjiang Bunker joined. This sudden rise in competition resulted in a serious price war and crashing prices in 2011. Most forms of maritime fuels are available, primarily IFO 180 centistoke and 380 centistoke; IFO 120 centistoke, MDG, MDO, and other diesels are available. Bunkering operations are done by fuel tender, as most berths do not have fueling equipment. Equally, drinking water is mostly delivered by tender.

Several dozen ship chandlers are capable of supplying all necessary deck, engine, cabin stores, and other provisions both at berth or at anchorage. The oldest international chandler is Tianjin Ocean Shipping Supply company (天津市外轮供应公司), owned by the Tianjin government. Most spare parts are available locally, and special orders can be flown in easily.

Bilge, slops and ballast water disposal is a major pollution hazard for the Bohai Bay, and it is tightly regulated by the MSA. Only specially authorized enterprises can engage in their removal and disposal or in tank cleanup. Nevertheless, illegal dumping of ballast water is a persistent problem and one of the Port's major law enforcement challenges. Ships carrying oil or liquid chemicals, and all ships over 10,000 gt are required to sign an Agreement for Ship Pollution Response with one of four authorized emergency spill response companies.

Tianjin Port Harbor Service Company (天津港港口服务公司) is the Group's organic "housekeeping" service, providing cabin, hold and bedding clean-up, and garbage disposal for ships at berth. Other companies are available for all sorts of cleaning, disinfection and deck maintenance, 15 companies are authorized for ship garbage collection.

As the port of a major city, facilities available to crews on shore leave are extensive, if somewhat difficult to reach. The International Seamen's Club (天津新港国际海员俱乐部) is located at Xingang Liumi Road, opposite the Bomesc shipyard. Around two dozen crew management companies provide replacement crews at all times.

=== Ship repair and shipbuilding facilities ===
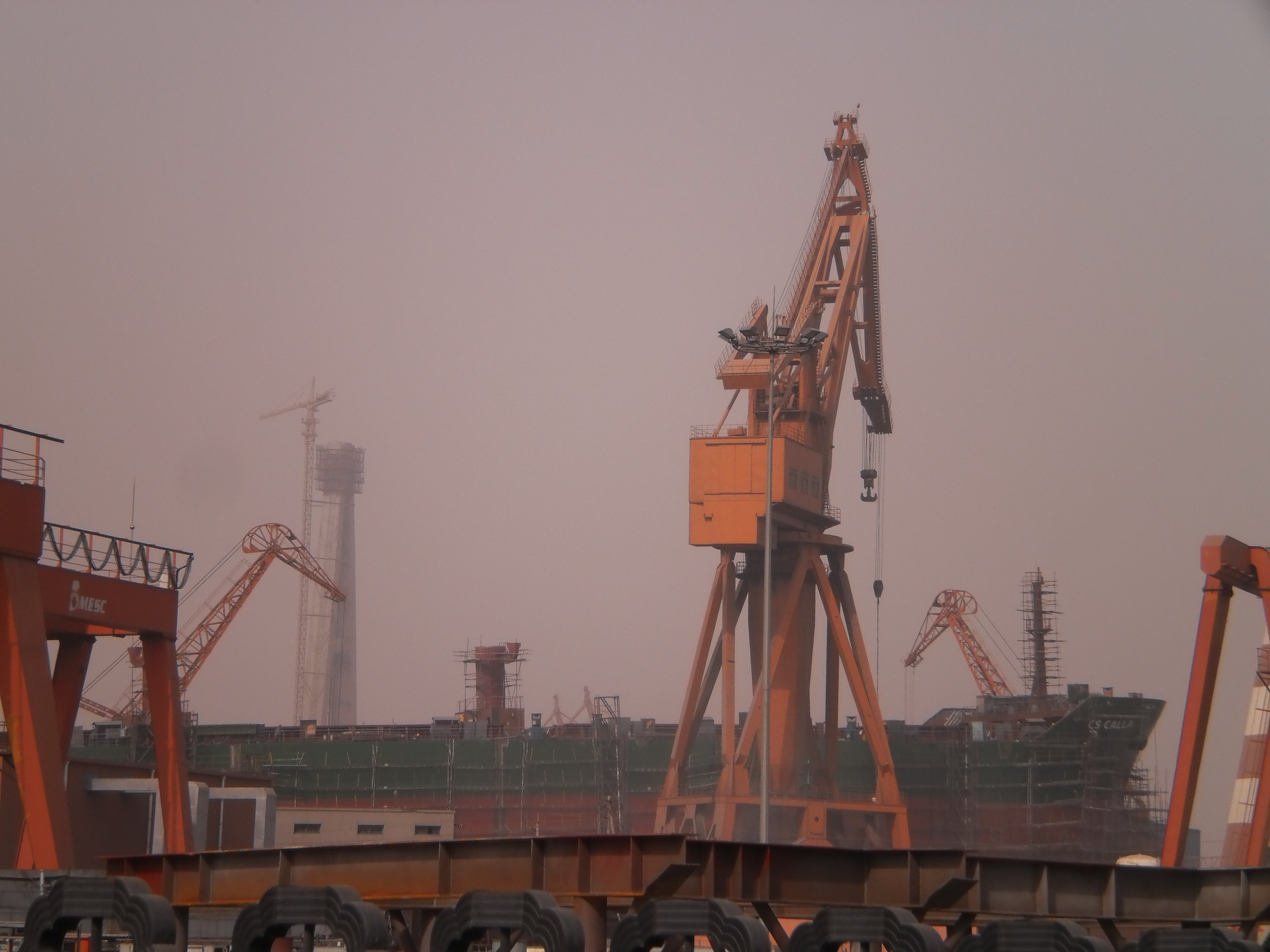
A ship under construction at the Bomesc Fabrication Site

Tianjin Port has several ship repair and shipbuilding facilities capable of carrying out almost all forms of ship repair and refitting for all but the largest ships, and those capabilities are increasing rapidly.

The Tanggu port area was one of the earliest modern shipbuilding areas of China. The still-functioning Taku Dockyard (now the Tianjin City Shipyard) was founded in 1880 and is the oldest modern dockyard in Northern China. Many small shipyards operated in the Haihe region, but most have closed in recent years or will soon close to make way for the large development projects of the Binhai Urban Core.

The main ship repair facility in the port is the CSIC Tianjin Xingang Shipyard. Founded in 1939, it is located at the very end of the main harbor basin, right next to the Haihe shiplock. Immediately next to it is the CCCC Bomesc Maritime Industry's facility built in 2007. On the Nanjiang region, Singapore's Sembawang Shipyard entered in 1997 to the first foreign joint shipyard project in China in partnership with Bohai Oil. That shipyard is now the CNOOC Bohai Oil BOHIC subsidiary.

A large number of ship repair companies offer maintenance services at berth, and the Tianjin Wuzhou Marine Service Engineering Co. (天津五洲海事工程有限公司) offers anchorage and under-way repairs using its specialized ship Jinyuanhangxiu 1 (津远航修1号), one of only five such vessels in China.

=== Trade and shipping services ===
One of the strategic goals of the port is to increase its high value-added services business, providing advance support for all forms of logistic activities.

The Tianjin International Trade and Shipping Service District (天津 与航运服务区) The Service District is composed of nine high-rise buildings, including the TPG main office building and the International Shipping Service Center.

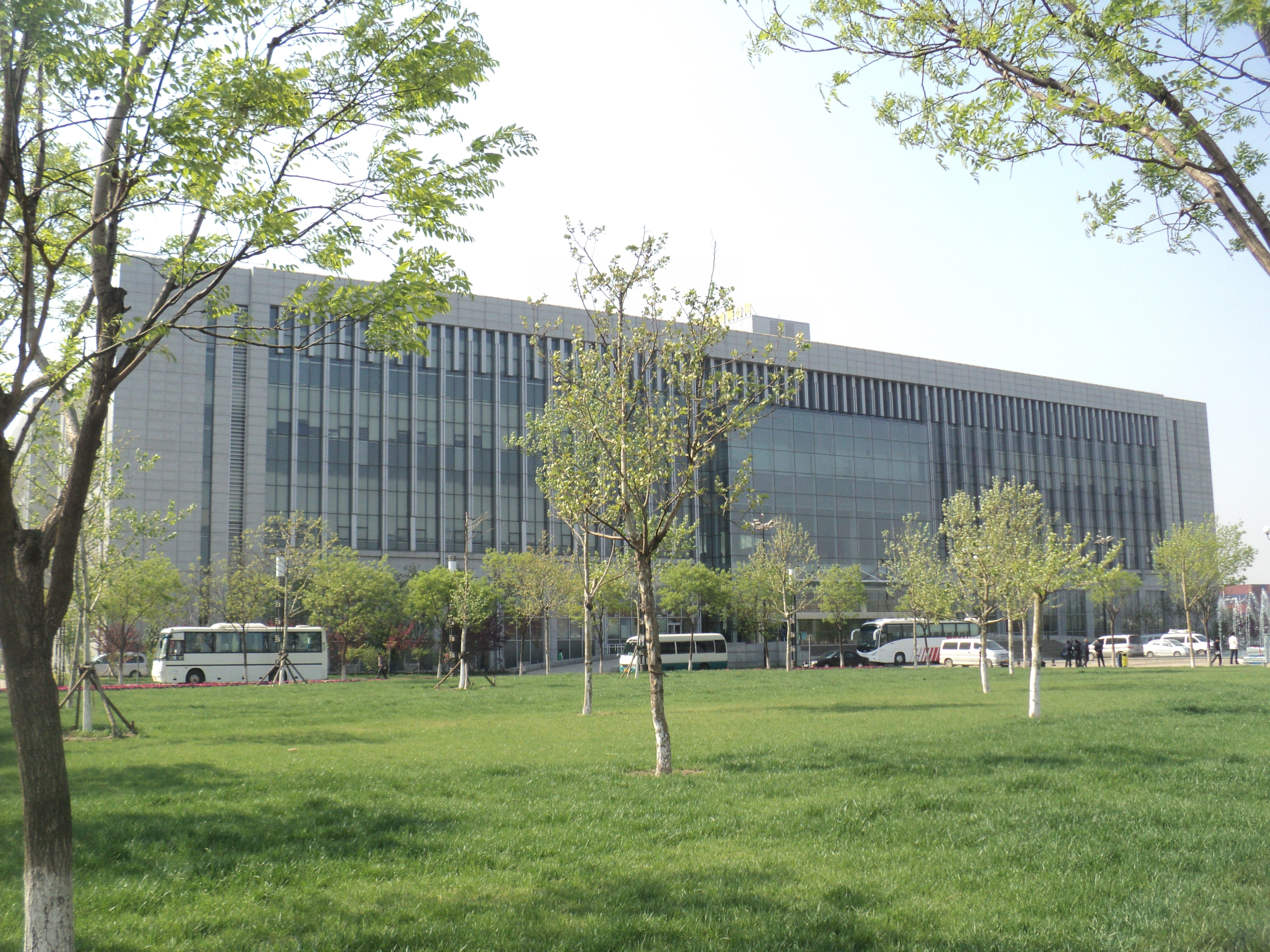
The Tianjin Port International Trade and Shipping Service Center

The Tianjin International Trade and Shipping Service Center (天津国际贸易与航运服务中心) provides "one-stop" service for all sorts of aspects of shipping and trade, with a core mission of centralizing and streamlining the clearance process. The Center aggregates 270 government service windows from 14 government agencies, including customs, inspection and quarantine, maritime safety, border control, traffic control, maritime court, electronic customs clearance, business taxes, and state audit and supervision.

The Dongjiang shipping services area is still under development, and aims to form a cluster of specific shipping services. Taking advantage of its favorable tax and currency exchange regime, the Dongjiang Bonded Port intends to attract a cluster of enterprises related to the financing of ship leasing and shipbroking and to other forms of shipping financing including offshore financial services, offshore banking, marine insurers and P&I clubs, ship registration, local offices of the leading classification societies, and others.

Engaging a shipping agent is mandatory for all foreign flagged ships, and Tianjin has several dozen such outfits operating at present. The largest agents are Tianjin Penavico (天津外轮代理公司), owned by TPG, and Tianjin Sinoagent (天津船务代理有限公司), a subsidiary of Tianjin Sinotrans. Agencies have fairly extensive obligations as intermediaries for most paperwork procedures involving TPG, ship operators, or government agencies, as well as their traditional duties of arranging ship supply and cargo handling.

== Passenger services ==
=== Passenger terminals ===
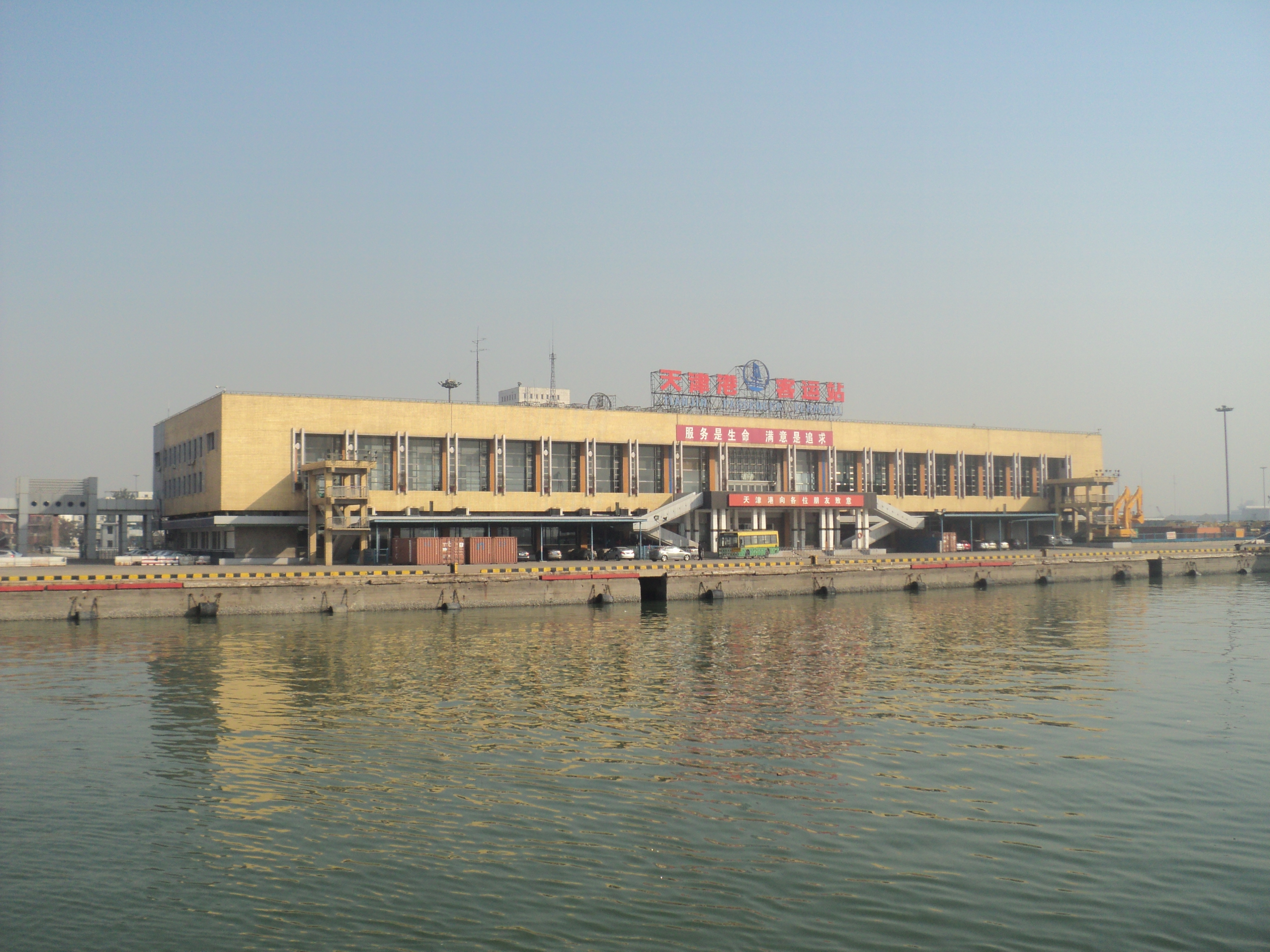
The Tianjin Xingang Passenger Terminal

The Tianjin Xingang Passenger Terminal (天津新港客运站) is run by the Tianjin Passenger Company and provides ferry services and coastal cruises. Two main regular ferry lines and one summer-only ferry line leave Tianjin, serviced by a fleet of three Ro-Ro ferry boats. There are two international destinations—Kobe in Japan and Incheon in South Korea—and one national destination, Dalian in Liaoning Province.

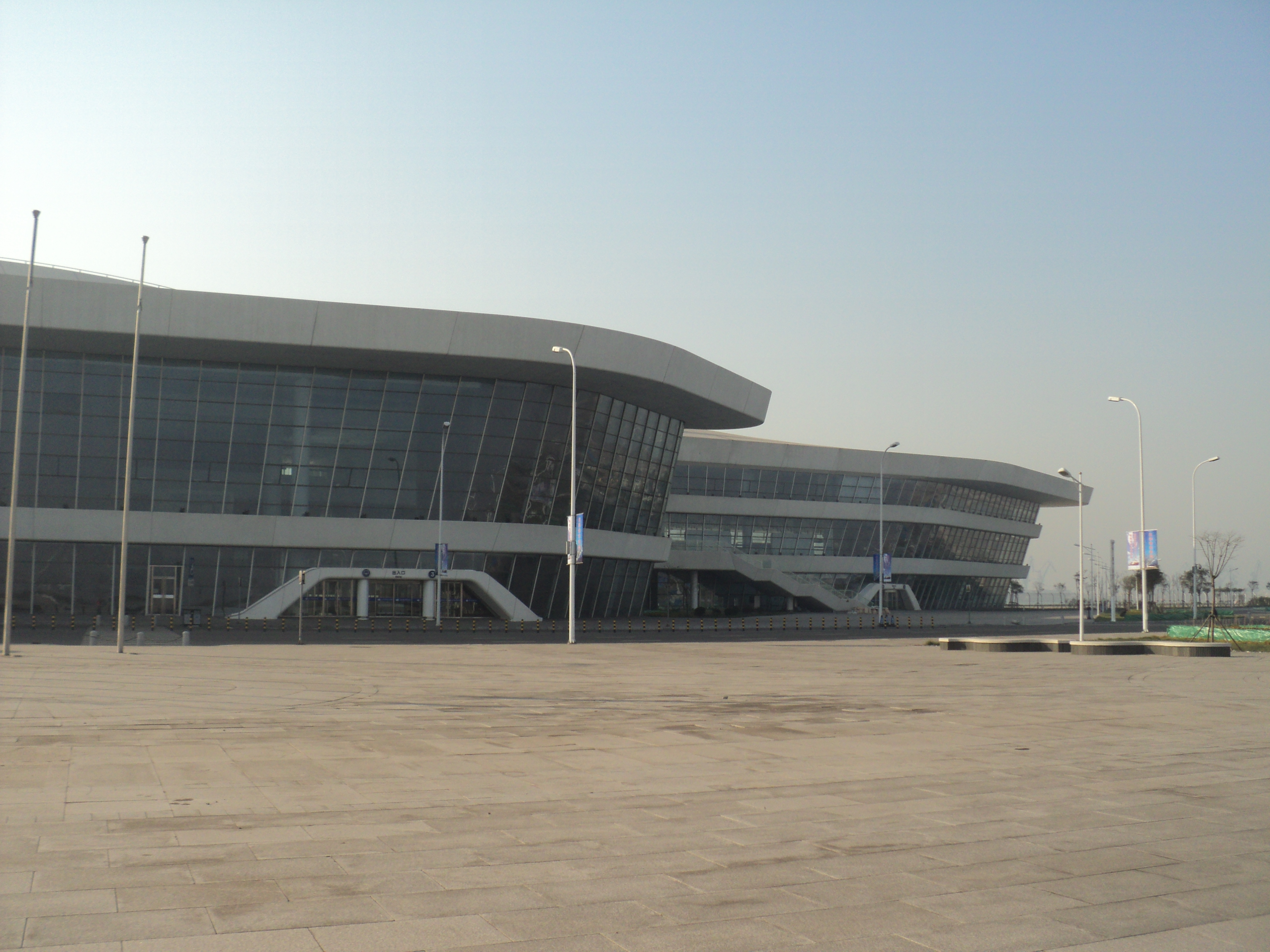
Tianjin Cruise Homeport

The Tianjin Cruise Homeport started operation in the summer of 2010. It is located in the southern tip of the Dongjiang peninsula. The all-services terminal building is a large white GFRC-clad building designed to mimic the flow of white silk on an ocean breeze. It has an annual capacity of 500,000 passengers. At present, the Homeport has two berths capable of accommodating ships up to 220,000 gt—enough to receive even the largest current cruisers.

=== Leisure services ===
There are three large-scale marina projects underway at the Tianjin Port to expand yachting services.

1. The Binhai Ocean One Yachting Club (滨海一洋游艇会) is being built at the southern end of the Dongjiang Scenic Area's artificial beach. It is planned to become a yachting port with 700 berths, plus an extra 200 pile mooring slots.
2. The Sino-Australia Royal Yacht City (中澳皇家游艇城) is a 1,000-berth development (to be completed in 2012) in the Tianjin Central Fishing Port.
3. The Hi-speed Tianjin Yacht City (海斯比天津游艇城) in the Binhai Tourist Area plans to add 3,000 berths, focusing on high-speed boats, sailboats and high-performance yachts.

Two companies offer short (30–45 minute) boat tours of the harbor, traveling to the end of the Chuanzhadong channel. The first, Tianjin Port Haiyi Travel Service Company (天津港海颐旅行社公司), a TPG subsidiary, runs the sightseeing boat Haiyi (海颐号) from the K1 berth of the Passenger Terminal, with capacity for 132 passengers (CN¥ 30 as of November 2011). The second, Tianjin Haihe Jinlu Sightseeing Boats Company (天津海河津旅游船公司) operates from the Sightseeing Boats Pier at the other side of the main basin. It runs two ships, the Haijing (海景号) with capacity for 150 passengers and the Jinhai (津海号) with capacity for 184 passengers (CN¥ 50 as of April 2011).

== Transportation and logistics ==
Storage, transportation, and all forms of logistics processing are the core activity of the Port; a majority of its land surface is dedicated to storage and processing facilities, with several million square kilometers of storage yards, warehouses, and tank farms operated by dozens of enterprises. There are two large-scale purpose-built logistics areas designed to provide support and facilities to the operating logistics outfits.

The chief logistics unit of the Port Group is Tianjin Logistics Development, established in 2009 by merging the Tianjin Port Storage and Distribution Company (天津港货运公司) with other Group logistics assets. TLD runs 1,800,000 square meters of storage yard, with a capacity for 32,000 TEU of containers, and is responsible for the establishment and management of the dry port network and the establishment of intermodal routes, as well as being the principal drayage provider.

=== Transportation corridors ===
China MSA's seaways plan for the Bohai Sea. Planned routes follow closely the seaways currently in use.

Two main sea routes connect the Bohai Bay with the Yellow Sea and the open ocean. These two routes carry the large majority of all traffic in and out of the Bohai Sea and can be very crowded. The main deep-water route (6 nautical miles wide) goes from the Laotieshan Channel (38°36.1'N, 120°51.3'E) at a 276° bearing until reaching a Traffic Separation Scheme south of Caofeidian (38°48.0'N/118°45.2'E), and can be quite a crowded waterway. A second main route (3 nautical miles wide westward, 3 nautical miles wide eastward) goes westward from Changshan channel (38°05.0'N/120°24.6'E) at a 293.5° bearing up to a point north of oil platform BZ28-1 (38°21.0'N/119°38.5'E), continuing at a 291° bearing up to the south of Caofedian Head (38°38.7'N/118°38.4'N) and then into the Xingang Main Channel.

The three main port areas are fairly poorly connected by road, requiring rather long detours to transport any cargo or equipment between them. While several bridges and tunnels directly linking Dongjiang with Beijiang and Nanjiang areas are projected for future development, these are still in early planning stages. To help relieve this internal bottleneck, the Port introduced a lighter route in April 2010 connecting Nanjiang (N-10 berth) and Beijiang (Tianjin Container Terminal) using one heavy barge (7800 DWT, 200 TEU). Another regular lighter route connecting Beijiang with Dongjiang was established in September 2010.

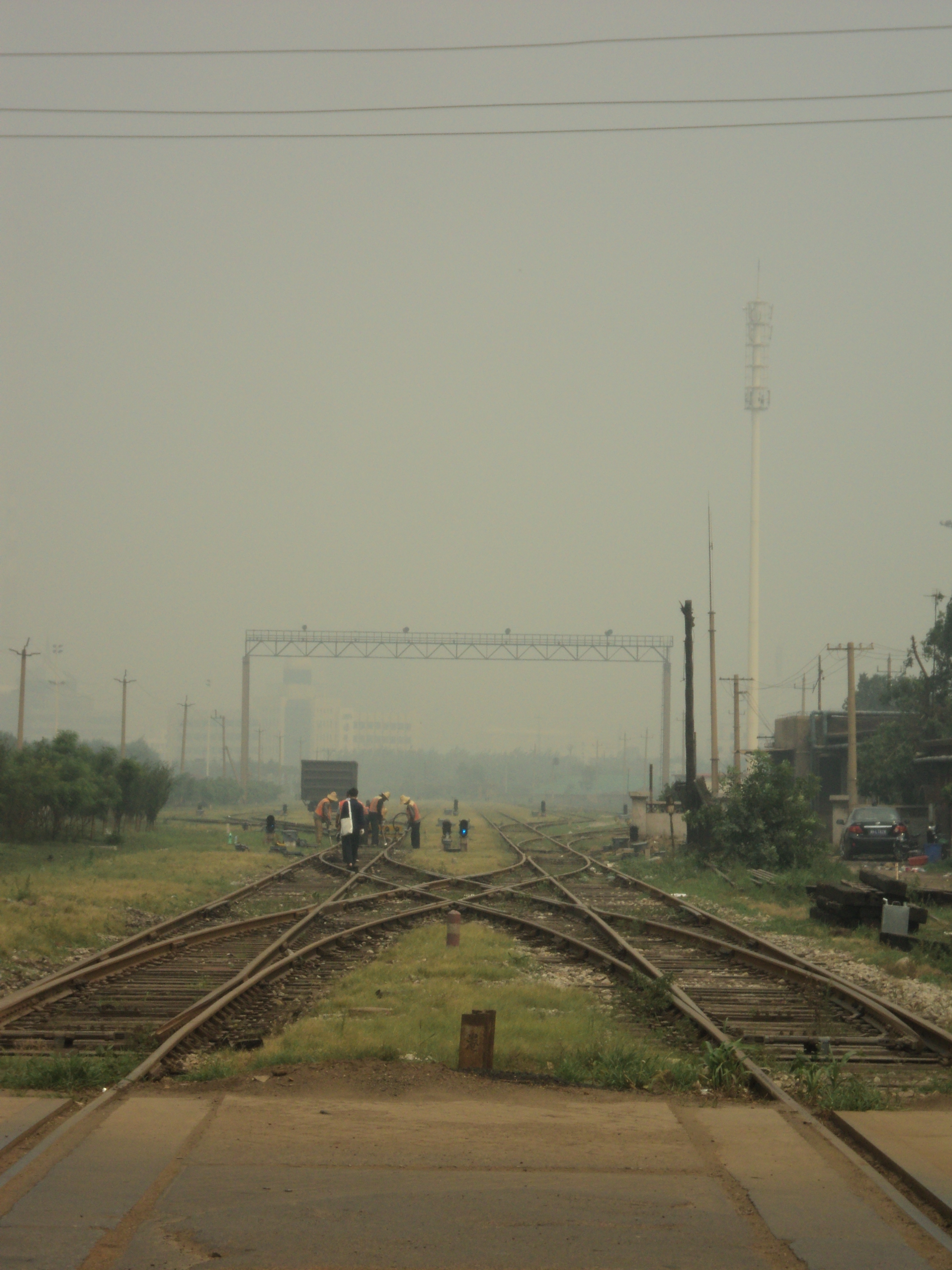
Internal port railroad approaching the Fourth Stevedoring Company wharf on the Beijiang Third Pier

Two main rail lines (First and Second Port Railroads: 进港一二线) serve the Beijiang and Nanjiang areas respectively. The Jinji Railway connects these lines as a de facto ring railroad. A web of around 60 kilometers of internal railways goes deep into the wharves and storage yards of the Beijiang area. The Nanjiang area is primarily connected through the Nanjiang Rail Bridge. This bridge was expanded to double-track in 2010 for an annual capacity of 70 million tonnes. A second bridge is under construction. Additionally, a conveyor belt corridor runs parallel to the railway, carrying coal and ore to the Bulk Logistics Center.

The internal roads in the Port carry an enormously heavy, noisy and noisome flow of traffic, and traffic jams are not uncommon at certain bottlenecks. The internal roads at the three main Port areas form a broken grid pattern, the east–west roads connecting with the expressways that feed the port. The main north–south roads are the Yuejin Road transfixing the Container Logistics Center and the Meizhou (Americas) Road in the Dongjiang Area.

The backbone road of the Port is the S11 Haibin Expressway (海滨高速), which runs north–south and roughly represents the Port's western boundary. (Note: As the expressway follows the original coastline, most of the land east of the road is reclaimed land, including most of the Port.) The main east–west feeder roads are the S40 Jingjintang Expressway (京津塘高速), which merges into the Jingmen road; the S13 Jinbin Expressway (津滨高速) and the G103 Highway, which both merge into the Xingang Fourth Road; and the S30 Jingjin Expressway (京津高速), which becomes the Jishuanggang road and then the Xingang 8th Road into Dongjiang. In the south, the Tianjin Avenue and the S50 Jinpu Expressway (津浦高速) connect into the Nanjiang and Lingang areas.

These feeder roads connect in turn with the thick Beijing-Tianjin road hub, with seven radial expressways from Beijing and four from Tianjin. Of these, the Jinji Expressway (S1) is the main alternative route into Beijing (through Pinggu) and the Northwest (through the 6th Ring Road and the G6 Jingla Expressway), while the G25 Changzhen Expressway is the main north–south connector.

The Port is 30 minutes away from Tianjin Binhai International Airport and 120 minutes from Beijing Capital International Airport. Two small general aviation aerodromes—Tanggu Airport (塘沽机场) and Binhai Eastern General Heliport (滨海东方通用直升机场)—provide offshore helicopter shuttles and other services to Port operators.

=== Logistics centers, yards and warehouses ===
Map of the Tianjin Port Container Logistics Center

The Tianjin Port Container Logistics Center (天津港集装箱物流中心) is located in the north part of the Beijiang area, in 7.03 square kilometers of reclaimed land. The Center currently hosts 42 logistics enterprises, and it has 350 hectares of yard space and 26 hectares of warehouses, or about 60% of the Port's container handling capacity.

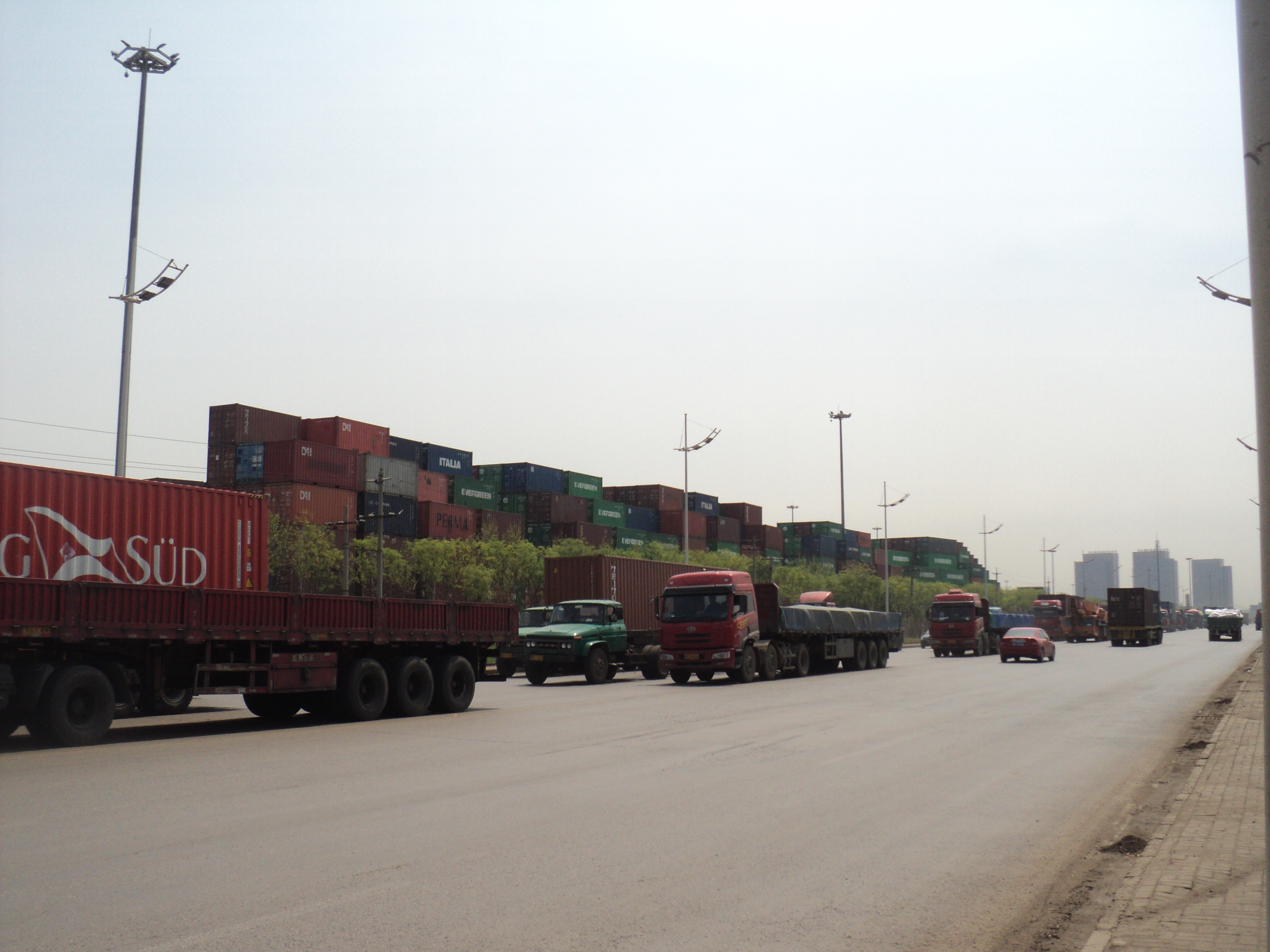
Heavy traffic at the Container Logistics Center

Tianjin Port International Logistics Development (TPL) was established in 2003 to take charge of the development, construction, operation and management of the Center.

The Tianjin Port Bulk Logistics Center (天津港散货物流中心) opened in 2000, built on 26.8 square kilometers of former salt flats to the south of Donggu. It serves as a large storage and distribution area for coal, ore and other bulk cargoes. As of April 2011, there were 268 enterprises operating within it. The Bulk Logistics Center is being progressively relocated south, to the Nangang area, to free its land for urban development (i. e. the Binhai Central New Town – 滨海中部新城)

The 12-5 plan envisages six large logistics parks in the port area by 2015: the Container Logistics and Bulk Cargo Centers will be upgraded to "Parks" (with additional policy privileges), joined by the newly established Nangang Chemical Logistics Park (南港化工物流园区), Lingang Industrial ProLogis Logistics Park (临港工业普洛斯物流园区), and the Central Fishing Port Logistics Park (中心渔港物流园区).

=== Economic Hinterland ===
The hinterland of the Tianjin Port (as determined by existing railway and road patterns) is vast. It includes the municipalities of Beijing and Tianjin, as well as the provinces of Hebei, Henan, Shanxi, Shaanxi, Ningxia, Gansu, Qinghai, Tibet and Xinjiang, amounting to over 5 million square kilometers, or 52% of China's area, and covering 17% of the country's population. Tianjin is also one of the railheads of the Eurasian Land Bridge. (Note: Tianjin Port is often named in publicity material as the start of the Chinese branch of Eurasian Land Bridge. Officially, however, the port of Lianyungang is the Bridge's start. Tianjin is indeed the proposed railhead of the UNESCAP Intermodal Transport Corridor 1 from Busan to Yekaterinburg via Irkutsk. ["Archived copy" (PDF). Archived from the original (PDF) on 22 December 2009.])

=== Dedicated container train routes ===
TPL owns and operates 15 different scheduled railway routes, dispatching 50-car (100 TEU) trains to 15 different cities in China, including Xi'an, Chengdu, Taiyuan, Ürümqi, Baotou, Shizuishan, Erenhot, Alashankou, and Manzhouli, the last three being border crossings. In the first half of 2011, these dedicated train lines carried 129,000 TEU, including cargoes for Eurasian destinations.

=== Dry ports ===
As of October 2011, Tianjin Port had established 21 dry ports, of which eight were fully operational. These ports are located at:

Map of the Port of Tianjin's National Network of Dry Ports and Intermodal Trains

1. Chaoyang (Beijing)
2. Pinggu (Beijing)
3. Baoding (Hebei)
4. Shijiazhuang (Hebei)
5. Zhangjiakou (Hebei)
6. Handan (Hebei)
7. Zibo (Shandong)
8. Dezhou (Shandong)
9. Zhengzhou (Henan)
10. Hebi (Henan)
11. Daqing(Heilongjiang)
12. Baotou (Inner Mongolia)
13. Bayannur (Inner Mongolia)
14. Erenhot (Inner Mongolia)
15. Houma (Shanxi)
16. Xi'an (Shaanxi)
17. Datong (Shaanxi)
18. Jiayuguan (Gansu)
19. Yinchuan (Ningxia)
20. Huinong (Ningxia)
21. Dulat (Xinjiang)

Erenhot and Dulat are border crossings. In 2010, the Tianjin dry ports processed 150,000 TEU worth of containers. The 12th five-year plan envisaged increasing throughput by Tianjin's dry ports to up to 1 million TEU by 2015.

== Friendship ports ==
- Amsterdam, Netherlands
- Barcelona, Spain
- Incheon, South Korea
- Kobe, Japan
- Marseille, France
- Melbourne, Australia
- Montreal, Canada
- Philadelphia, United States
- Tacoma, United States
- Tokyo, Japan
- Trieste, Italy
- Zeebrugge, Belgium
- Fort Pierce, United States
