= Tianjin Maritime Court =

Court in China

Tianjin Maritime Court (天津海事法院) is a maritime court with jurisdiction of all matters of national and international Maritime law. The Court was the first of the ten specialized maritime courts set up in China in 1984, and it has jurisdiction over all port, coasts islands and sea of Tianjin Municipality and Hebei Province in an area delimited by a line between the junction of Hebei Province and Liaoning Province and a line from the junction between Hebei Province and Shandong Province. The Tianjin Maritime Court is a middle-level court, and it falls under the appellate jurisdiction of Tianjin Higher People's Court

The court deals specifically with all forms of contracts, torts, offenses and crimes under maritime law, including hearing cases of maritime trade contracts, bills of lading, common average, marine insurance disputes, maritime arbitration award recognition and enforcement (which the court refers to a subordinate court set up in Qinhuangdao.), maritime transport, salvage, marine insurance, marine environmental damage, marine exploration and development, port operations, port warehousing, shipping and freight forwarders and other types of cases.

The court is frequently used for pollution cases. Litigants mostly choose this venue because of its independent rulings and its use of new legal interpretations. However, the court also faces challenges with enforcing its decisions and remains at risk for corruption.
