= Tianjin Port (Group) Company =

Tianjin Port (Group) Company 天津港（集团）公司
- Company type: State-owned enterprise
- Industry: Port operations
- Founded: 2004
- Headquarters: Tianjin, People's Republic of China
- Area served: People's Republic of China
- Key people: Chairman: Yu Rumin
- Owner: Tianjin Municipality People's Government
- Parent: Tianjin SASAC
- Website: Tianjin Port Holdings Company Limited

Tianjin Port (Group) Company (TPG) is the main operator of the Port of Tianjin. It was established in 2004 by the incorporation of the Tianjin Port Authority, part of the process in China of making port authorities into autonomous corporations. It has been a top 500 company in China since 2004.
