= Maritime court (China) =

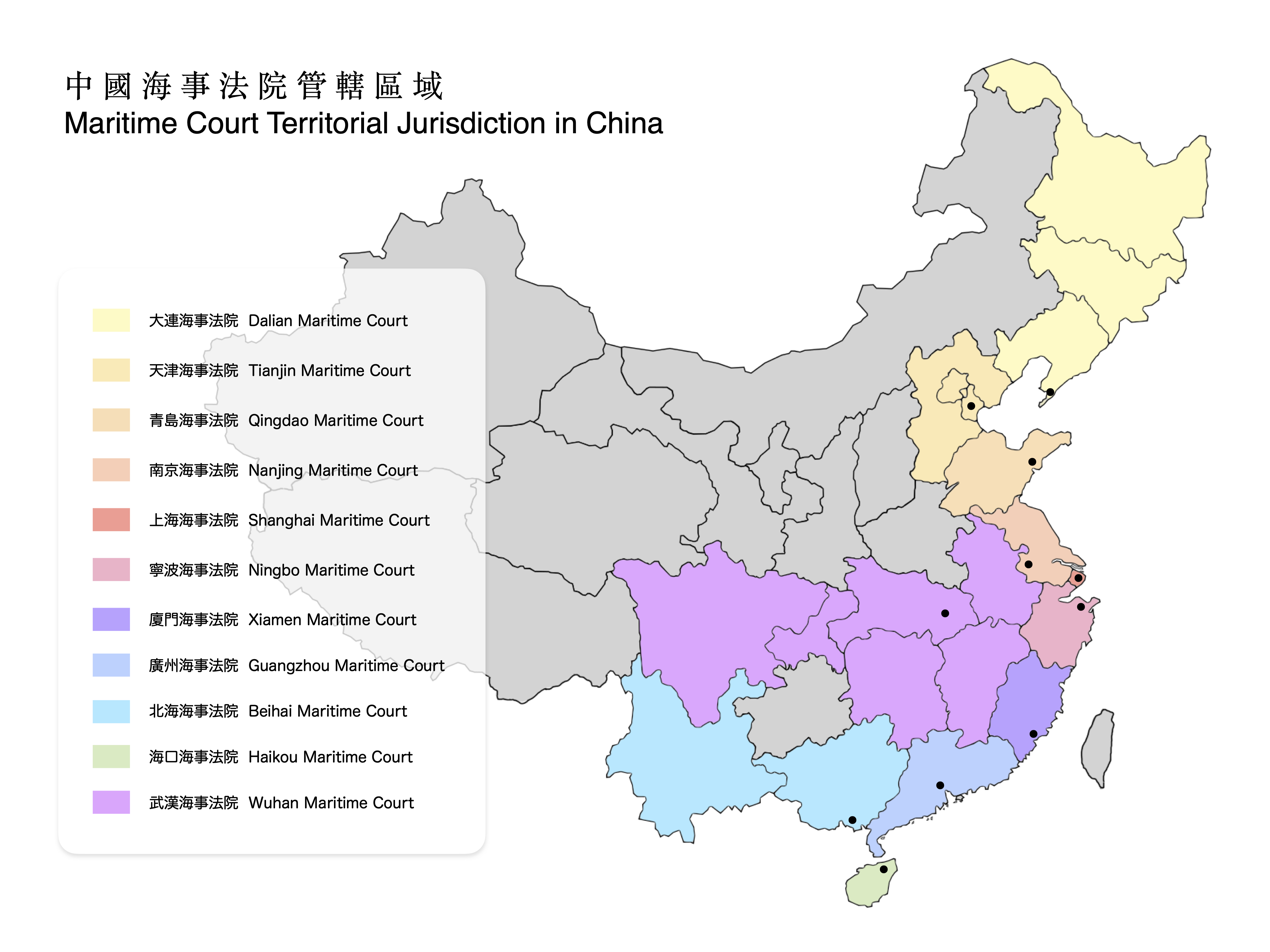
Maritime Court Territorial Jurisdiction in China

A maritime court is a court of special jurisdiction of China that deals with matters in the waters under Chinese jurisdiction. In 2016, China created the International Maritime Judicial Center which will be a branch of already existing military court. The purpose for the creation was to protect the country's maritime rights and sovereignty claims.
