= Stephen Pichon =

French politician (1857–1933)

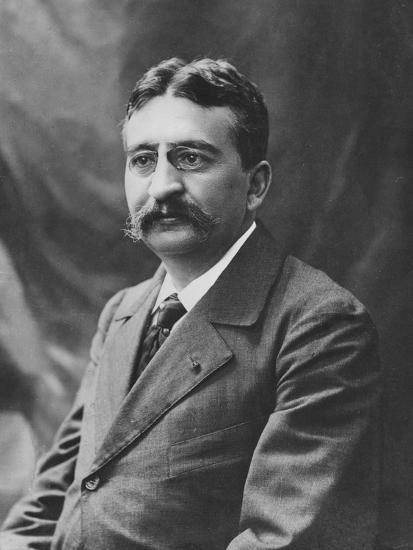

French Minister to China
- In office 1897–1900

Resident-General of the Tunisian Protectorate
- In office 1901–1906
- Preceded by: Georges Benoit.
- Succeeded by: Gabriel Alapetite

Minister of Foreign Affairs
- In office 1906–1911
- Prime Minister: Ferdinand Sarrien; Georges Clemenceau; Aristide Briand
- Preceded by: Léon Bourgeois
- Succeeded by: Jean Cruppi
- In office 1913–1913
- Prime Minister: Raymond Poincaré; Aristide Briand; Louis Barthou
- Preceded by: Charles Jonnart
- Succeeded by: Gaston Doumergue
- In office 1917–1920
- Prime Minister: Georges Clemenceau
- Preceded by: Louis Barthou
- Succeeded by: Alexandre Millerand

Personal details
- Born: 10 August 1857 Arnay-le-Duc, Côte-d'Or, France
- Died: 18 September 1933 (aged 76) Vers-en-Montagne, Jura, France
- Occupation: Politician
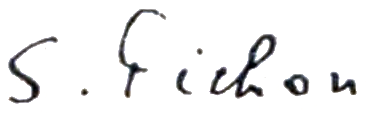
- Signature

Stephen Jean-Marie Pichon (10 August 1857 – 18 September 1933, Vers-en-Montagne) was a French journalist, diplomat and politician of the Third Republic. The Avenue Stéphen-Pichon in Paris is named after him.

== Life ==
Stephen Jean-Marie Pichon was born on 10 August 1857 in Arnay-le-Duc, Côte-d'Or.

He served as French Minister to China (1897–1900), including the period of the Boxer Uprising. Stephen Pichon was appointed Resident-General of the Tunisian Protectorate in 1901, replacing Georges Benoit. In 1906 he was succeeded by Gabriel Alapetite.

An associate of Georges Clemenceau, he served several times under Clemenceau and others as Minister of Foreign Affairs. Stephen Pichon in Paris managed the French agreement with transformation of Czechoslovak National Council to the Provisional Czechoslovak government on 26 September 1918 (when Edvard Beneš received confirmation of Tomáš Garrigue Masaryk from Washington).

His most notable service was under Clemenceau during the latter part of the First World War and the Paris Peace Conference of 1919, but, like most of the other foreign ministers at the conference, Pichon was largely sidelined by the more forceful figure of his head of government.

Stephen Pichon died on 18 September 1933 in Vers-en-Montagne, Jura.

== Honours ==
- Knight of the Legion of Honour 31 October 1895
- Officer of the Legion of Honour 8 April 1898
- Commander of the Legion of Honour 14 August 1900.
- The Avenue Stéphen-Pichon in the 13th arrondissement of Paris, near the Place d'Italie, was named in his honour in 1934.
- A school in Bizerta in Tunisia has his name

== Publications ==
- Articles et chroniques parlementaires dans La Justice
- Écrits de publiciste dans Le Petit Journal
- La diplomatie de l’Église sous la IIIe République, édition O. Doin, 1892, 78 pages
- Rétablissement des relations diplomatiques entre la France et la République dominicaine, 1894
- Traité d'arbitrage pour la délimitation de la Guyane française, 1897
- Les derniers jours de Pékin par Pierre Loti, précédé de La Ville en flammes par Stephen Pichon, et la Défense de la légation de France par Eugène Darcy, 1902
- Dans la Bataille, essai biographique, édition A. Méricant, 1908, 314 pages
- La Guerre et les neutres par René Moulin, préface de Stephen Pichon, 1915
- Manuscrits et correspondances, manuscrits de la bibliothèque de l'Institut de France, et de la Bibliothèque nationale de France (données Gallica).
- Introduction to Sokolow, Nahum (1919). History of Zionism: 1600–1918. Longmans, Green & Co., London.
