= List of Major National Historical and Cultural Sites in Tianjin =

This list is of Major Sites Protected for their Historical and Cultural Value at the National Level in the Municipality of Tianjin, People's Republic of China.

| Site | Date | Location | Image | Coordinates | Designation |
|---|---|---|---|---|---|
| Dule Temple 独乐寺 | Liao | Ji County | Upload file | 40°02′50″N 117°24′11″E | 1-84 |
| Boxer Rebellion Luzu Hall Altar Site 义和团吕祖堂坛口遗址 | 1900 | Hongqiao District | Upload file | 39°08′45″N 117°09′28″E | 2-3 |
| Taku Forts 大沽口炮台 | 1858 | Binhai New Area | Upload file | 38°58′29″N 117°42′42″E | 3-4 |
| Wanghailou Church 望海楼教堂 | 1869-1904 | Hebei District | Upload file | 39°08′52″N 117°11′44″E | 3-6 |
| Astor Hotel Site, Tianjin 天津利顺德饭店旧址 | 1863 | Heping District | Upload file | 39°07′15″N 117°12′59″E | 4-199 |
| Tianjin Nankai High School 天津市南开中学 | 1904 | Nankai District | Upload file | 39°07′46″N 117°10′17″E | 4-200 |
| Guangdong Guild Hall, Tianjin 天津广东会馆 | 1907 | Nankai District | Upload file | 39°08′29″N 117°10′55″E | 5-207 |
| Tianjin Quanye Bazaar Building 天津劝业场大楼 | 1928 | Heping District | Upload file | 39°07′36″N 117°12′02″E | 5-477 |
| Tianfei Palace Site 天妃宫遗址 | Yuan to Qing | Hedong District | Upload file | 39°06′37″N 117°14′21″E | 6-3 |
| Shi Family Residence 石家大院 | 1875 | Xiqing District | Upload file | 39°08′08″N 117°00′46″E | 6-315 |
| Beijing-Hangzhou Grand Canal 京杭大运河 | Spring and Autumn period to Qing | | Upload file | | 6-810 |
| Images in Qianxiang Temple 千像寺造像 | Liao | Ji County | Upload file | | 6-811 |
| Yien Yieh Commercial Bank Site 盐业银行旧址 | Republic of China | Heping District | Upload file | 39°07′47″N 117°12′36″E | 6-889 |
| French Municipal Administration Council Building Site 法国公议局旧址 | Republic of China | Heping District | Upload file | 39°07′40″N 117°12′33″E | 6-890 |
| Former Residence of Liang Qichao 梁启超旧居 | 1914-1927 | Hebei District | Upload file | 39°08′13″N 117°11′58″E | 6-891 |
| Ji County White Tower 蓟县白塔 | Liao to Qing | Ji County | Upload file | 40°02′32″N 117°24′11″E | 7-715 |
| Tianhou Palace 天后宫 | Ming to Qing | Nankai District | Upload file | 39°08′36″N 117°11′34″E | 7-716 |
| Tianzun Ge 天尊阁 | Qing | Ninghe County | Upload file | 39°33′52″N 117°45′46″E | 7-717 |
| Li Chun Shrine 李纯祠堂 | Qing to Republic of China | Nankai District | Upload file | 39°07′24″N 117°09′41″E | 7-718 |
| Dagu Northern Naval Dockyard Site 北洋水师大沽船坞遗址 | Qing | Binhai New Area | Upload file | 38°58′44″N 117°41′06″E | 7-1622 |
| Tanggu Railway Station Site 塘沽火车站旧址 | Qing | Binhai New Area | Upload file | 39°00′24″N 117°40′40″E | 7-1623 |
| Beiyang University Hall Site 北洋大学堂旧址 | 1902 | Hongqiao District | Upload file | 39°10′41″N 117°10′39″E | 7-1624 |
| Buildings of Marco Polo Square 马可·波罗广场建筑群 | 1908-1924 | Hebei District | Upload file | 39°08′04″N 117°11′55″E | 7-1625 |
| Tianjin West Railway Station Main Building 天津西站主楼 | 1910 | Hongqiao District | Upload file | 39°09′30″N 117°09′50″E | 7-1626 |
| Modern Architecture of the Five Main Avenues of Tianjin 天津五大道近代建筑群 | Republic of China | Heping District | Upload file | 39°06′46″N 117°12′47″E | 7-1627 |
| Qian Xiang Yi Silk Warehouse Site 谦祥益绸缎庄旧址 | 1917 | Hongqiao District | Upload file | 39°08′50″N 117°10′56″E | 7-1628 |
| Yellow Sea Chemical Industry Research Institute Site 谦祥益绸缎庄旧址 | 1922 | Binhai New Area | Upload file | 39°00′55″N 117°40′15″E | 7-1629 |
| Tianjin Business School Main Building Site 天津工商学院主楼旧址 | 1924 | Hexi District | Upload file | | 7-1630 |

== See also ==
- Principles for the Conservation of Heritage Sites in China
- Tianjin Museum
