= Jinghai Town =

Jinghai Town 静海镇
- Town
- Location in Tianjin
- Coordinates: 38°55′46″N 116°55′1″E
- Country: People's Republic of China
- Municipality: Tianjin
- District: Jinghai

Population (2010)
  - Total: 154,325

Jinghai Town (Chinese: 静海镇; pinyin: Jìnghǎi Zhèn) is a township-level division and the county seat of Jinghai District, Tianjin, China.

== Notable people ==
Cao Futian, Boxer movement commander.
