= Lin Hei'er =

Chinese rebel during the Boxer Rebellion

- 林黑兒
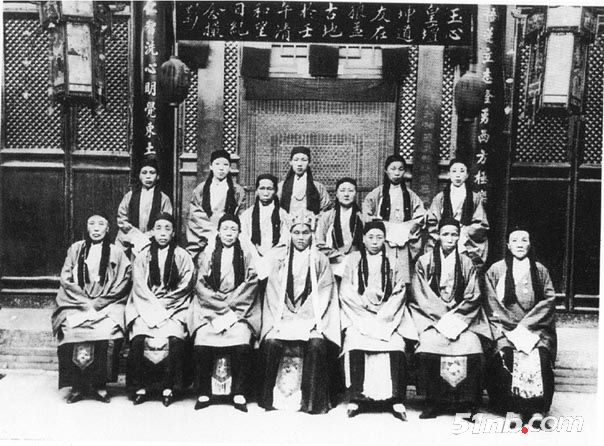
- Lin Hei'er and leaders of the Red Lantern Unit
- Born: 1871; Tianjin, China
- Died: ca 1900
- Occupation: Rebel
- Organization: Red Lantern
- Title: Holy Mother of the Yellow Lotus
- Spouse: Li Youchuan

Lin Hei'er (Chinese: 林黑兒; 1871 – 1900?) was a Chinese rebel during the Boxer Rebellion, known as the Holy Mother of the Yellow Lotus (Chinese: 黃蓮聖母). She was an acrobat with martial arts knowledge who became a member of the Yihetuan. During the Boxer Rebellion, she organized and commanded the Red Lantern unit of female soldiers in Tianjin.

== Life ==
Born on a Tianjin canal houseboat, Lin studied acrobatics and earned a living as an itinerant entertainer with her father. She married Li Youchuan while still very young. Li Youchuan was arrested by British soldiers during a raid against the opium trade and died in prison. Other accounts say that she later became a prostitute in Houjia, on the south bank of the South Canal in the Hongqiao District, Tianjin. It is also said that she also worked as a witch. The theory that Lin Heier worked as a prostitute comes from some unofficial histories of the Qing Dynasty.There is some controversy as to whether she worked as a prostitute. Some unofficial histories of the Qing Dynasty said that Lin Heier was a pimp and even had a chaotic private life since childhood, which may not be very credible. Furious with foreigners because of the death of Li Youchuan, Hei'er joined the rebels of the Yihetuan. Once trained in martial arts, she trained female recruits and founded the Red Lantern Unit of young female soldiers, the name coming from the color of their clothes. With rebel's widows she formed the Blue Lantern Unit and with the old women, the Black Lantern Unit. In addition she formed the Pan Lantern Unit of cooks who were in charge of feeding the rebel troops. She recruited widows, prostitutes, beggars and peasants into her ranks and rejected well-to-do women as useless "lotus feet".

In July 1900, the combined force of the Eight-Nation Alliance descended on Beijing and Tianjin and looted and pillaged the cities. Lin Hei'er and other leaders put up fierce resistance. Lin Hei'er was injured during the Battle of Tientsin and was captured along with the other leaders on July 14, 1900, when the imperial troops who secretly helped the rebels abandoned them to their fate. Her final destination is unknown. Probably she was tried and executed, although turned into a popular heroine, the popular songs proclaimed that she survived.

A monument in her honor, the Red Lantern monument, was erected in 1994 near her place of birth.

== See also ==
- List of people who disappeared

== Bibliography ==
- Hevia, James L (2007). "Looting and its discontents: Moral discourse and the plunder of Beijing, 1900–1901". In Bickers, Robert; Tiedemann, R. G. (eds.). The Boxers, China, and the World. Rowman & Littlefield Publishers. ISBN 9780742571976.
- Lee, Lily Xiao Hong; Lau, Clara; Stefanowska, A. D. (2015). Biographical Dictionary of Chinese Women: v. 1: The Qing Period, 1644-1911. Routledge. ISBN 9781317475880.
- O'Connor, Richard (1973). The Boxer Rebellion. Hale. ISBN 9780709147800.
