= Siege of the International Legations =

1900 siege in Peking during the Boxer Rebellion

- Part of the Boxer Rebellion
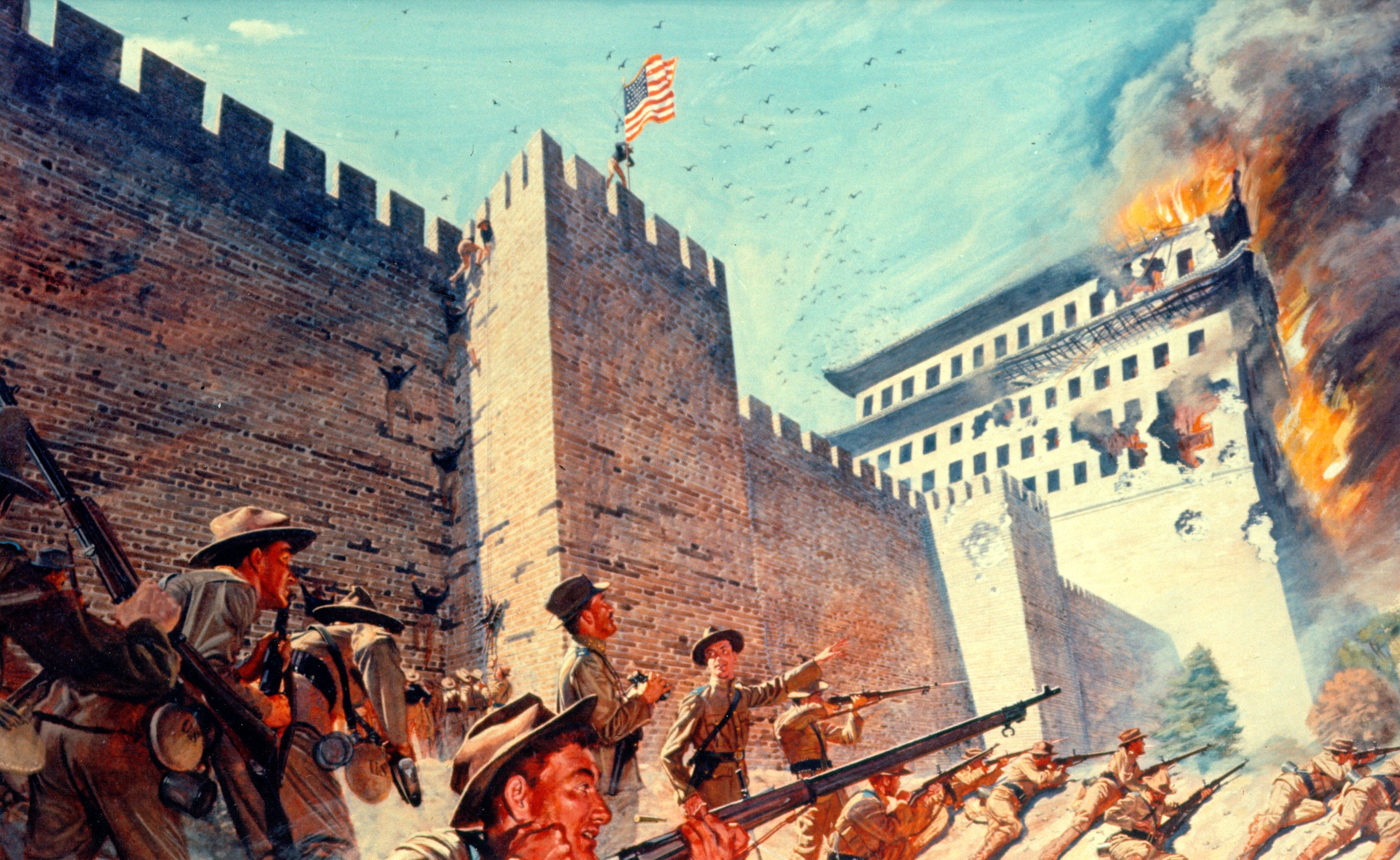
- I'll Try, Sir!: American troops scale the walls of Peking, with the Fox Tower in flames. Depicted is trumpeter Calvin Titus who first climbed the wall and was later awarded the Medal of Honor.
Date	June 20 – August 14, 1900 (1 month, 3 weeks and 4 days)
Location	Peking, China 39°54′11″N 116°24′06″E
Result	Allied victory

Belligerents
Eight-Nation Alliance: (United Kingdom of Great Britain and Ireland) United Kingdom; Russia; France; Japan; United States; Italy; Germany; Austria-Hungary; Netherlands; Belgium; Spain; (Qing dynasty) Chinese Christian refugees	Qing dynasty Boxer movement

Commanders and leaders
Claude MacDonald; Alfred Gaselee; Edward Seymour; Nikolai Linevich; Yevgeny Alekseyev; Alfred von Waldersee; Eugène Darcy; Gorō Shiba; Adna Chaffee	(Qing dynasty) Empress Dowager Cixi (Qing dynasty) Ronglu (Qing dynasty) Li Hongzhang (Qing dynasty) Prince Yikuang (Qing dynasty) Prince Duan (Qing dynasty) Dong Fuxiang (Qing dynasty) Ma Haiyan (Qing dynasty) Ma Fulu † (Qing dynasty) Ma Fuxiang (Qing dynasty) Ma Fuxing; Cao Futian; Zhang Decheng †

Casualties and losses
190 military casualties, 13 civilians killed	approx. 2,500

The Siege of the International Legations was a pivotal event during the Boxer Rebellion in 1900, in which foreign diplomatic compounds in Peking were besieged by Chinese Boxers and Qing Dynasty troops.

The Boxers, fueled by anti-foreign and anti-Christian sentiments, targeted foreigners and Chinese Christians, causing approximately 900 soldiers, sailors, marines, and civilians from various nations, along with about 2,800 Chinese Christians, to seek refuge in the Legation Quarter. The Qing government, initially ambivalent, ultimately supported the Boxers following international military actions.

The siege lasted 55 days, marked by intense combat and a brief truce, until an international relief force arrived from the coast, defeated the Qing forces, and lifted the siege. The failure of the siege and the subsequent occupation of Peking by foreign powers effectively ended the Boxer movement and increased foreign influence and intervention in China.

== Legation Quarter ==
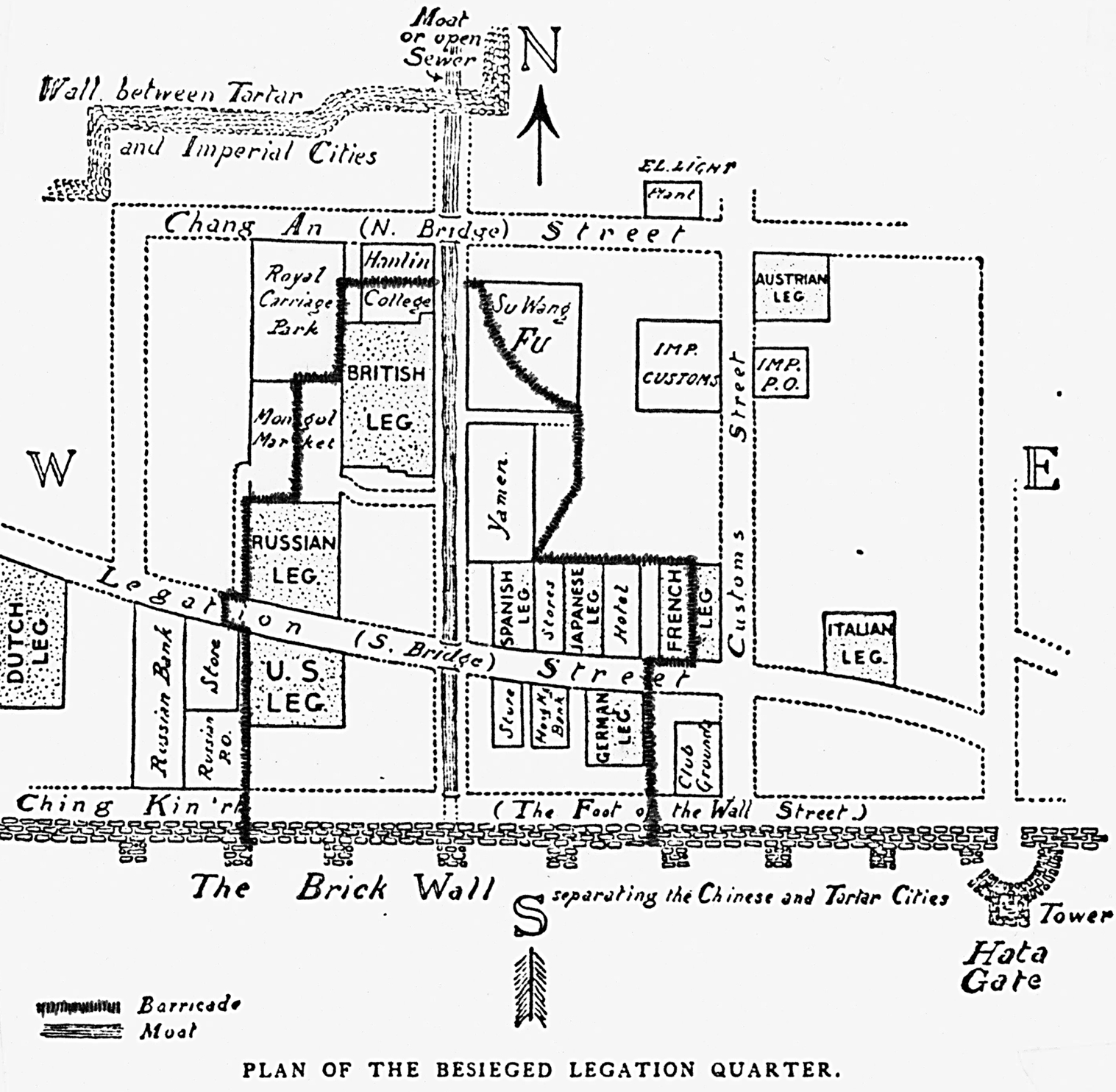
Map of the Legation Quarter, showing the defensive lines. Most civilians took refuge in the British Legation.

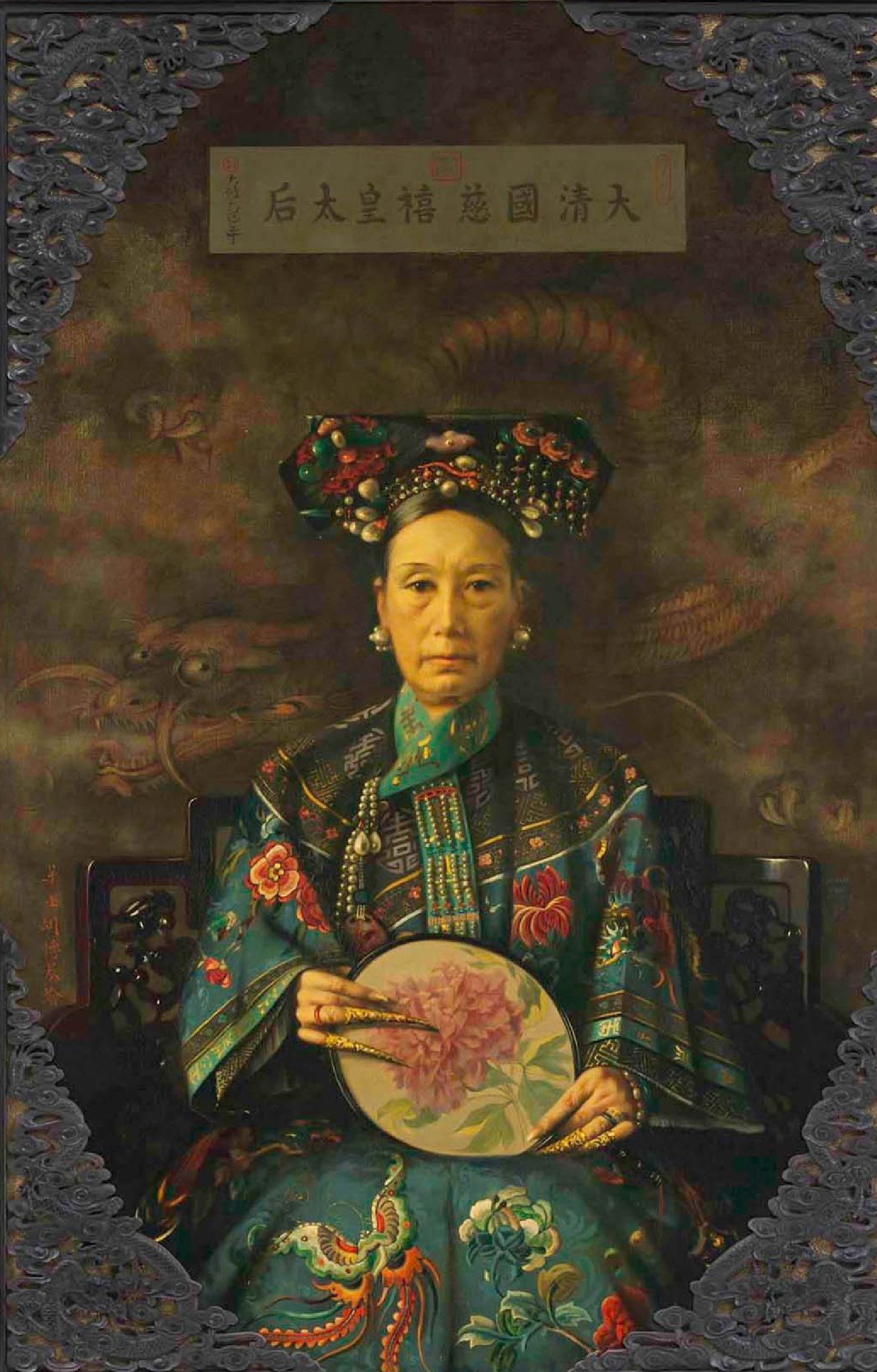
One of the historical oil paintings by Western artists depicting Empress Dowager Cixi

The Legation Quarter was approximately .5 mi (0.80 km) long and .75 mi (1.21 km) wide. It was located in the area of the city designated by the Qing government for foreign legations. In 1900, there were eleven legations located in the quarter, as well as a number of foreign businesses and banks. Ethnic Chinese-occupied houses and businesses were also scattered about the quarter.

The twelve or so Christian missionary organizations in Peking were not located in the Legation Quarter, but rather dispersed around the city. In total, about 500 citizens of Western countries and Japan resided in the city. The northern side of the Legation quarter was near the Imperial City, where the Empress Dowager Cixi resided. The massive Tartar Wall which ringed the entire city of Peking bordered the south. The eastern and western sides of the Legation Quarter were major streets.

== Rising tensions ==
By 1900, foreign powers had been chipping away at Chinese sovereignty for over six decades. After Chinese defeats in the Opium Wars and Tonquin War, the Qing government was forced to sign several "unequal treaties" with the Western powers, granting them the right to free trade in the previously isolationist nation, and granted extraterritoriality for subjects of Western nations. Japan obtained similar privileges after its victory in the First Sino-Japanese War. Anti-Japanese and anti-Western sentiments helped lead to the formation of the Yihetuan, whose stated goal was to drive foreigners and foreign influence, including Christianity, out of China.

=== Boxer movement ===
Authorities differ as to the origin of the Boxers, but they became prominent in Shantung (Shandong) in 1898 and spread northward toward Peking. They were an indigenous peasant movement, related to the secret societies that had flourished in China for centuries and that had, on occasion, threatened Chinese central governments. The Boxers were named—probably by American missionary Arthur H. Smith—for their acrobatic rituals, which included martial arts, twirling swords, prayers and incantations.

The Boxers believed that, with the proper ritual, they would become invulnerable to Western bullets. The religious and magical practices of the Boxers had "as a paramount goal the affording of protection and emotional security in the face of a future... that was fraught with danger and risk." The Boxers had no central organization but appear to have been organized on the village level. They were anti-foreign and anti-missionary. Their slogan was "Support the Qing! Destroy the Foreigner!"

=== Boxers attack Christians ===
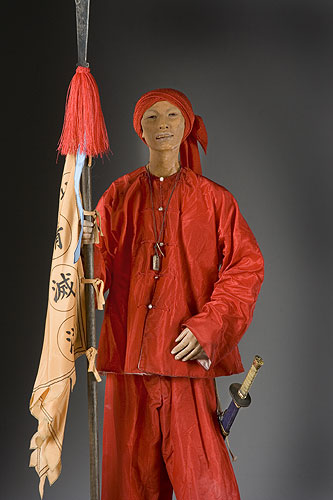
Wax sculpture of a Boxer. Most were armed only with spears and swords.

In early 1900 near Peking, Boxers burned Christian churches, murdered Chinese Christians and intimidated Chinese officials who stood in their way. Two missionaries, Protestant William Scott Ament and Catholic Bishop Favier, reported to the diplomatic ministers (Ambassadors) about the growing threat. American Minister Edwin H. Conger cabled Washington, "The whole country is swarming with hungry, discontented, hopeless idlers."; requesting a warship to be stationed offshore of Tientsin, the nearest port to Peking, he reported, "Situation becoming serious."

On May 30, the diplomats, led by British Minister Claude Maxwell MacDonald, requested that foreign soldiers come to Peking to defend the legations and the citizens of their countries. The Chinese government reluctantly acquiesced, and the next day more than 400 soldiers from eight countries disembarked from warships and traveled by train to Peking from Tientsin. They set up defensive perimeters around their respective missions.

On June 5, the Boxers cut the railroad line to Tientsin, and Peking became isolated from other foreign settlements. On June 11, a Japanese diplomat, Sugiyama Akira, was murdered by soldiers of Gen. Dong Fuxiang, and the next day the first Boxer, dressed in his finery, was seen in the Legation Quarter. The German Minister, Clemens von Ketteler, and German soldiers captured another Boxer.

In response, that afternoon thousands of Boxers burst into the walled city of Peking and burned most of the Christian churches and cathedrals in the city, murdering many Chinese Christians and several Catholic priests. The Boxers accused Chinese Christians of collaborating with the foreigners. American and British missionaries and their converts took refuge in the Methodist Mission and American marines repulsed an attack there by the Boxers. Soldiers at the British embassy and German legations shot and killed several Boxers. The siege was called by the New York Sun "the most exciting episode ever known to civilization."

== Dilemma of the Chinese government ==
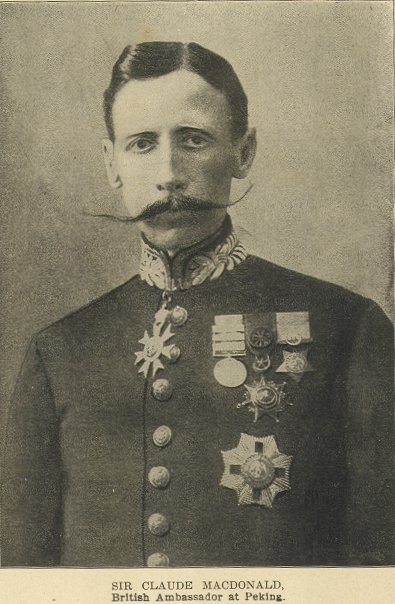
British Minister Sir Claude MacDonald

In mid-June 1900, the Chinese government was still indecisive about the Boxers. Some officials—Ronglu, for example—counseled the Empress Dowager Cixi that the Boxers were "rabble" who would be easily defeated by foreign soldiers. On the other side of the question were anti-foreign officials who advised cooperation with the Boxers; "The Court appears to be in a dilemma," said Sir Robert Hart, "If the Boxers are not suppressed, the Legations threaten to take action—if the attempt to suppress them is made, this intensely patriotic organization will be converted into an anti-dynastic movement."

The event that irrevocably pushed the Chinese government to the side of the Boxers was the attack by foreign warships on the Taku Forts on June 17. The attack was made to try to maintain communications with Tientsin and aid an army under the command of Adm. Edward Seymour in its attempt to march to Peking during the Seymour Expedition and reinforce the Legations.

On June 19, the Empress Dowager sent a diplomatic note to each of the legations in Peking informing them of the attack on the Taku Forts and ordering all foreigners to depart Peking for Tientsin within 24 hours. Otherwise, said the note, "China will find it a difficult matter to give complete protection." Upon receipt of the note, the diplomats convened and agreed it would be suicidal to leave the Legation Quarter and travel to the coast in an unfriendly countryside.

The next morning, June 20, Baron von Ketteler, the German Minister, proposed to take up the matter with the Zongli Yamen, the Chinese Foreign Ministry, but he was murdered by a Manchu officer, Capt. En Hai of the Hushenying, while en route to the meeting. With this, the Ministers informed all their citizens in Peking to take refuge in the Legation Quarter. Thus began the 55-day siege.

== Siege ==
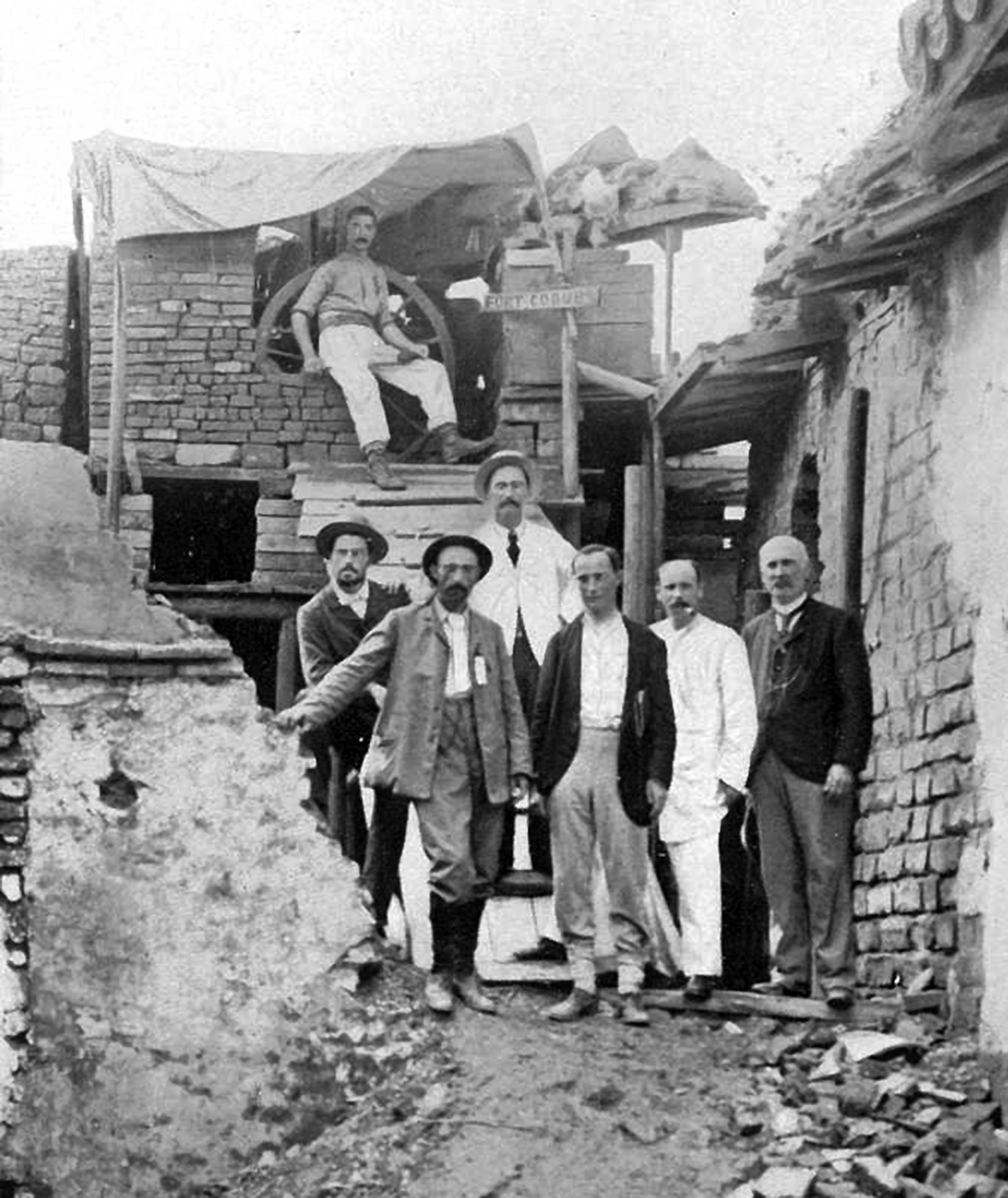
Frank Gamewell (second from left, standing) and the "Fighting Parsons" built fortifications to protect the British Legation from Chinese attacks.

The British, American, French, Italian, German, Japanese, and Russian military guards each took responsibility for the defense of their respective legations. The Austrians and Italians abandoned their isolated legations. The Austrians joined the French and the Italians collaborated with the Japanese. The Japanese and Italian force established defense lines in the Fu – a large mansion and park where most of the estimated 2,812 Chinese Christians taking refuge were housed. The American and German Marines held positions on the Tartar Wall behind their legations.

The 409 foreign soldiers had the job of defending a line that snaked through 2,176 yd (1,990 m) of urban terrain. The great majority of foreign civilians took refuge in the British Embassy, the largest and most defensible of the International Legations, despite the burning of Peking University in an effort to damage the British Legation, which was only a few feet away.

A census of civilians counted 473 foreign civilians in the Legation Quarter: 245 men, 149 women, and 79 children. About 150 of the men volunteered to participate, to a greater or lesser extent, in the defense. The civilians included at least 19 nationalities, of which British and Americans were the most numerous. Large numbers of Chinese Christians were conscripted for labor, especially for building barricades.

The British Minister Claude MacDonald was selected as the commander of the defense, and Herbert G. Squiers, an American diplomat, became his chief of staff. The guards of the different countries, however, operated semi-independently, and MacDonald could only suggest, not order, coordinated action. The guards were not well armed, and only the American Marines had sufficient ammunition. The defenders had three machine guns, and the Italians had a small cannon. An old cannon barrel was found in the Legation Quarter and from it a serviceable artillery piece was constructed that the Americans called "Betsy" and others called "the International".

The foreigners ransacked the Legation Quarter for food and other supplies. Food and water were adequate, although the foreigners without private food stocks subsisted on a steady diet of horsemeat and musty rice. However, the Chinese Christians, especially the Catholics, had a much harder time of it and were starving by the end of the siege; the Protestant missionaries took care of their converts, but the Chinese Catholics were mostly neglected. Medical supplies were scarce but a sizeable number of doctors and nurses, mostly missionaries, were present.

American missionaries took over management of most necessities for life in the Legation Quarter, including food, water, sanitation, and health. MacDonald appointed Methodist Missionary Frank Gamewell as chief of the Fortifications Committee. Gamewell and his crew of "fighting parsons" were acclaimed for their defensive works surrounding the British Legation.

About three miles distant from the Legation Quarter, a similar siege took place at the Beitang or North Cathedral of the Roman Catholic Church. 33 priests and nuns, 43 French and Italian soldiers under the command of Lieutenant Eugène Darcy, and more than 3,000 Chinese Christians held off the Chinese army and Boxers. In addition to Boxers, the cathedral was also attacked by Metropolitan Banner Manchus. Manchu Prince Zaiyi's Manchu bannermen in the Tiger and Divine Corps led attacks against the Catholic cathedral church. Manchu official Qixiu also led attacks against the cathedral.

=== Chinese advances ===
For several days after June 20—the official beginning of the siege—neither the foreigners inside the Legation Quarter nor the Chinese soldiers outside it had any coherent plan for defense or attack. The number of Chinese soldiers ringing the legations is uncertain but numbered in the thousands. On the west were the Gansu Muslim soldiers of Dong Fuxiang, and on the east were units of the Peking Field Army. The overall commander of the Chinese forces was Ronglu—who was anti-Boxer and disapproved of the siege. Chinese policy equivocated between belligerence and conciliation during the 55-day siege. Several attempts by Ronglu to bring about a ceasefire failed because of suspicions and misunderstandings on both sides.

The Chinese first attempted to massacre the foreigners in the Legation Quarter by using fire. For several days at the beginning of the siege they set fires in the buildings around the British Legation. On June 23, most of the buildings of the Hanlin Academy, the national library of China, and its books, many irreplaceable, burned. Both sides blamed the other for its destruction. The Chinese Army then turned its attention to the Fu, the refuge for most of the Chinese Christians, and the domain of Lt. Col. Gorō Shiba, the most admired military officer in the siege. Shiba, with his small group of Japanese soldiers, mounted a skillful defense against the Chinese, who advanced behind walls built ever-closer to the Japanese, threatening to surround them in a vise-like approach. British soldiers were often detailed to reinforce the Japanese during attacks and all admired Shiba's work.

The most desperate fighting took place near the French Legation, where 78 French and Austrians and 17 volunteers were under assault in convoluted urban terrain, in which the front lines were only 50 ft (15 m) from each other. The French also feared that Chinese sappers were digging tunnels to undermine their positions, which did happen.

The Germans and the Americans occupied perhaps the most crucial of all defensive positions: the Tartar Wall. Holding the top of the 45 ft (14 m) tall and 40 ft (12 m) wide Wall was vital; if it fell to the Chinese, they would have an unobstructed field of fire into the Legation Quarter. The German barricades faced east on top of the wall and 400 yd (370 m) west were the west-facing American positions.

The Chinese advanced toward both positions by building barricades ever closer. It was a claustrophobic existence for the soldiers on the wall: "The men all feel they are in a trap," said the American commander, Capt. John T. Myers, "and simply await the hour of execution." Added to the daily advances of the Chinese were the nightly rifle and artillery fire and firecrackers, designed to keep the foreigners awake: "From June 20 to July 17 we had nightly attacks," said a missionary woman. American Minister Conger said, "that some of them, for furious firing, exceeded anything he experienced in the American Civil War." The hard-pressed Legation guards saw their numbers diminish daily with casualties.

The Chinese were divided on the prosecution of the siege. The anti-Boxer faction, headed by Ronglu, and the anti-foreign faction, headed by Prince Duan, squabbled at the Chinese court. Cixi, the Dowager Empress, vacillated between the two. She declared a truce for negotiations on June 25, but it endured only a few hours. She later declared a cease-fire on July 17, which lasted for most of the remainder of the siege. As a sign of good will, she sent food and supplies to the foreigners. The disagreements among the Chinese occasionally led to altercations and violence between Boxers and soldiers, and between different units of the Imperial army.

=== Fight on the Wall ===
The most critical threat to the survival of the foreigners came in early July. On June 30, the Chinese forced the Germans off the Tartar Wall, leaving the American Marines alone in its defense. At the same time, a Chinese barricade advanced to within a few feet of the American positions, and it became clear that the Americans had to abandon the wall or force the Chinese to retreat.

At 2:00 am on July 3, the foreigners launched an assault against the Chinese barricade on the wall with 26 British, 15 Russians, and 15 Americans under the command of American Capt. John T. Myers. As hoped, the attack caught the Chinese sleeping; about 20 of them were killed and the survivors expelled from the barricades. Two American Marines were killed, and Capt. Myers was wounded and spent the rest of the siege in the hospital. The capture of Chinese positions on the Wall was hailed as the "pivot of our destiny" by one of the besieged. The Chinese did not attempt to regain or advance their positions on the Tartar Wall for the remainder of the siege.

=== Darkest days and truce ===
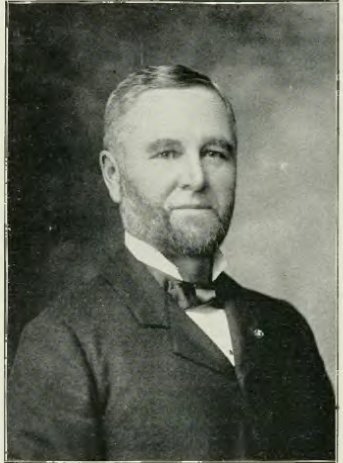
Edwin H. Conger, the American Minister to China

Sir Claude MacDonald said July 13 was the "most harassing day" of the siege. The Japanese and Italians in the Fu were driven back to their last defense line. While the Fu was under heavy attack, the Chinese detonated a mine beneath the French Legation, destroying most of it, killing two soldiers and pushing the French and Austrians out of most of the French Legation. Frank Gamewell began digging bombproof shelters as a last refuge for the besieged. The end seemed near.

The next day, a conciliatory message received from the Chinese raised hopes, which were dashed on July 16 when the most capable British officer was killed and journalist George Ernest Morrison was wounded. However, American Minister Conger carried on a communication with the Chinese government, and on July 17 firing died down on both sides and an armistice began.

=== Relief of the Legations ===
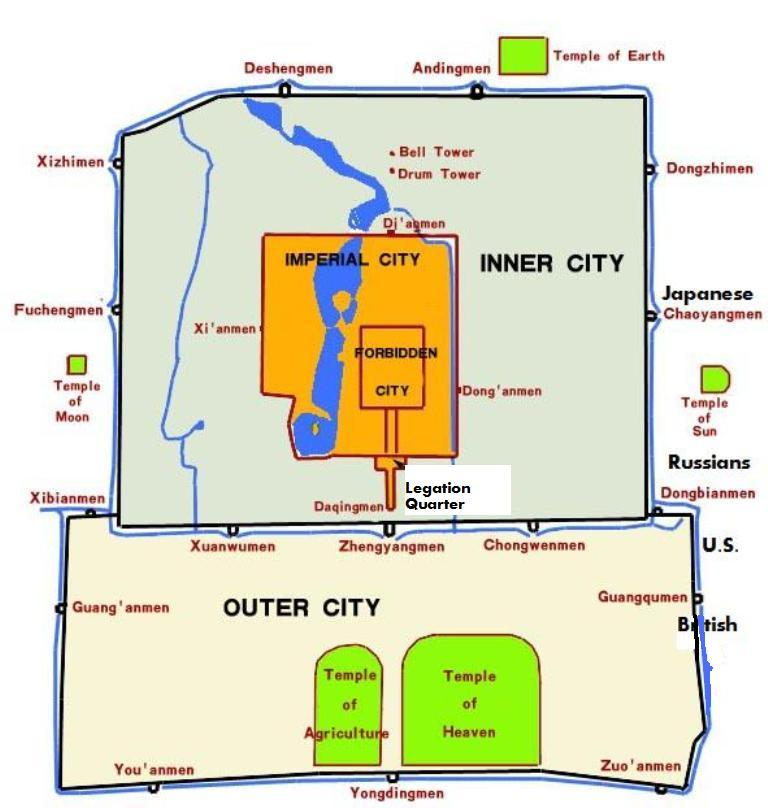
Beijing in 1900 was surrounded by high walls broken by many gates (men). The location of the Legation Quarter and of the armies of Japan, Russia, the U.S. and Great Britain on the morning of August 14 are shown on the map.

On July 28, the foreigners in the Legation Quarter received their first message from the outside world in more than a month. A Chinese boy—a student of the missionary William Scott Ament—sneaked into the Legation Quarter with the news that a rescue army of the Eight-Nation Alliance was in Tientsin 100 mi (160 km) away and would advance shortly to Peking. The news was hardly reassuring, as the besieged had been expecting an earlier rescue. The Chinese government also passed along inquiries about the welfare of the besieged from their governments. A British soldier suggested that an appropriate reply would be, "Not massacred yet."

After many relatively quiet days, the night of August 13, with the rescue army just 5 mi (8.0 km) outside the gates of Peking, may have been the most difficult of the siege. The Chinese broke the truce with an artillery barrage of the British Legation and heavy fire in the Fu. However, the Chinese confined themselves to firing from a distance rather than mounting an assault until, at 2:00 am on August 14, the defenders heard the sound of a machine gun from the east: a sign the rescue army was on the way. At 5:00 am came the sound of artillery outside the walls of Peking.

Five national contingents advanced on the walls of Peking on August 14: British, American, Japanese, Russian and French. Each had a gate in the Wall for its objective. The Japanese and Russians were delayed at their gates by Chinese resistance. The small French contingent got lost. The Americans scaled the walls rather than attempting to force their way through a fortified gate. However, it was the British who won the race to relieve the siege of the legations; they entered the city through an unguarded gate and proceeded with virtually no opposition.

At 3:00 pm, the British passed through a drainage ditch—the "water gate"—under the Tartar Wall. Sikh and Rajput soldiers from India and their British officers were the first to enter the Legation Quarter. The Chinese armies ringing the legation quarter dissipated. A short time later the British commander, Gen. Alfred Gaselee, entered and was greeted by Sir Claude MacDonald dressed in "immaculate tennis flannels" and a crowd of cheering ladies in party dresses. The American troops, under Gen. Adna Chaffee, arrived at 5:00 pm. The commanding Chinese Muslim general, Ma Fulu, and four cousins of his were killed in action against the foreign forces. After the battle was over, the Chinese Muslim forces guarded the Empress Dowager Cixi when she fled to Xi'an with the entire Imperial Court; general Ma Fuxiang assisted in guarding Cixi.

== Casualties ==
The foreigners were united in declaring the miraculous nature of their survival: "I seek in vain some military reason for the failure of the Chinese to exterminate the foreigners," said an American military officer. Missionary Arthur Smith summed up the Chinese military performance: "Upon unnumbered occasions, had they been ready to make a sacrifice of a few hundred lives, they could have extinguished the defence [of the Legation Quarter] in an hour." However, soldiers on both sides fought and died in large numbers. The foreign soldiers defending the Legation Quarter suffered heavy casualties; of the 409 soldiers, 55 were killed and 135 wounded, a casualty rate of 46.5%. 13 civilians were killed and 24 wounded, mostly men who participated in the defence.

A small Japanese force of one officer and 24 sailors commanded by Colonel Shiba Gorō distinguished itself defending the Fu and the Chinese Christians there. It suffered casualties recorded at greater than 100%, because many Japanese troops wounded and entered into the casualty lists returned to the battle and were wounded and re-recorded. The French force of 57 men also suffered more than 100% casualties.

== Propaganda ==
During the siege, Sheng Xuanhuai and other provincial officials suggested the Qing court give Li Hongzhang full diplomatic power to negotiate with foreign powers. Li Hongzhang telegraphed back to Sheng Xuanhuai on June 25, describing the war declaration a "false edict" (luanming). Later, the "Southeast Mutual Protection" was reached by provincial officials as a consensus not to follow Empress Cixi's declaration of war. Li Hongzhang also refused government orders for more troops to fight against the foreigners, which he had available, derailing the Chinese war effort.

Li Hongzhang was able to use the siege as a political weapon against his rivals in Peking, as he controlled the Chinese telegraph service; he exaggerated and lied, claiming that Chinese forces committed atrocities and murder upon the foreigners and exterminated all of them. This information was sent to the Western world. He aimed to infuriate the Europeans against the Chinese forces in Peking, and succeeded in spreading massive amounts of false information to the West, which played a part in the massive atrocities which the foreigners later committed upon the Chinese in Peking. Li Hongzhang was praised by the Westerners for refusing to obey the Chinese government's orders and not sending his own troops to help the Chinese army during the Boxer Rebellion.

== Aftermath ==
The Empress Dowager and her court fled Peking on August 15. She remained in exile in Shanxi province until 1902, when she was permitted by the foreign armies occupying Peking to return to reoccupy the throne. For China, the Boxer Rebellion was a disaster, but the country remained united, although it had seemed likely before the Boxer Rebellion that it would be divided by the colonial powers.

The Chinese government supported the Boxers, who otherwise might have turned anti-Qing and hastened the extinction of the dynasty, but was unsuccessful in killing the foreigners in the Legations. Had the Chinese succeeded, retribution from the Western nations and Japan might have been more severe. Ronglu later took credit for saving the besieged: "I was able to avert the crowning misfortune which would have resulted from the killing of the Foreign Ministers". Ronglu was being disingenuous, as his forces came very close to breaking the ability of the besieged to resist.

The Boxer movement disintegrated during the siege. Some Boxers were incorporated into the army but, probably, most returned to their homes in the countryside, where they became targets for punitive expeditions by the foreign military forces occupying Peking after the siege.

The military occupation of Peking and much of northern China became an event of looting and violence in which foreign soldiers, diplomats, missionaries, and journalists participated. Reports of the behaviour of the foreigners in Peking caused widespread criticism in Western countries, including from Mark Twain. While the rescue of the besieged foreigners in the Legation Quarter was seen as a proof of the superiority of Western civilization, the sordid aftermath of the siege may have contributed to many people in the United States and Europe re-evaluating the morality of forcing Western culture and religion onto the Chinese.

The area where the Legation quarter was is now partly occupied by many national and city government buildings.

== See also ==
- Qing Dynasty Royal Decree on events leading to the signing of Boxer Protocol
- 55 Days at Peking (1963 historical war film)
