= List of Privy Counsellors (1901–1910) =

This is a list of privy counsellors of the United Kingdom appointed during the reign of King Edward VII, from 1901 to 1910.

== Edward VII ==
=== 1901 ===
- William Maclagan (1826–1910)
- Lewis Fry (1832–1921)
- Frederick Halsey (1839–1927)
- Edmund Barton (1849–1920)
- Sir Samuel Griffith (1845–1920)
- Sir Francis Plunkett (1835–1907)
- Sir Mortimer Durand (1850–1924)
- Sir Dighton Probyn (1833–1924)
- The Earl Roberts (1832–1914)
- The Lord Wenlock (1849–1912)
- Sir Spencer Ponsonby-Fane (1824–1915)
- Arthur Winnington-Ingram (1858–1946)
- The Marquess of Cholmondeley (1858–1923)
- The Lord Chesham (1850–1907)
- The Lord Milner (1854–1925)
- Sir James Mathew (1830–1908)
- Sir Herbert Cozens-Hardy (1838–1920)
- The Duke of Buccleuch (1831–1914)
- Sir Henry Aubrey-Fletcher, Bt (1835–1910)
- Sir Andrew Scoble (1831–1916)

=== 1902 ===
- Sir Arthur Wilson (1837–1915)
- Sir John Day (1826–1908)
- Sir John Bonser (1847–1914)
- The Earl of Leven (1835–1906)
- The Earl of Dudley (1867–1932)
- The Earl of Minto (1845–1914)
- The Lord Rothschild (1840–1915)
- The Lord Kelvin (1824–1907)
- The Lord Lister (1827–1912)
- Sir Michael Herbert (1857–1903)
- George Wyndham (1863–1913)
- Sir Edward Grey, Bt (1862–1933)
- Sir John Dorington, Bt (1832–1911)
- Sir Hugh Guion MacDonnell (1831–1904)
- Sir Antony MacDonnell (1844–1925)
- Sir Alfred Lyall (1835–1911)
- Sir Albert Hime (1842–1919)
- Sir Robert Bond (1857–1927)
- Sir Ernest Cassel (1852–1921)
- Richard Haldane (1856–1928)
- Arthur Jeffreys (1848–1906)
- James Round (1842–1916)
- Austen Chamberlain (1863–1937)
- Sir Richard Cartwright (1835–1912)
- The Lord Revelstoke (1863–1929)
- Sir Joseph Dimsdale, Bt (1849–1912)
- George Finch (1835–1907)
- Henry Hobhouse (1854–1937)
- Sir Savile Crossley, Bt (1857–1935)

=== 1903 ===
- Randall Davidson (1848–1930)
- The Hon. Sir Francis Bertie (1844–1919)
- The Earl of Onslow (1853–1911)
- Sir Arthur Charles (1839–1921)
- Sir Ralph Henry Knox (1836–1913)
- Lord Stanley (1865–1948)
- The Hon. Alfred Lyttelton (1857–1913)
- H. O. Arnold-Forster (1855–1909)
- The Marquess of Salisbury (1861–1947)
- Charles Dickson (1850–1922)

=== 1904 ===
- Sir Edwin Egerton (1841–1916)
- The Hon. Charles Hardinge (1858–1944)
- Sir Henri-Elzéar Taschereau (1836–1911)
- Sir Gainsford Bruce (1834–1912)
- Charles Booth (1840–1916)
- William Kenyon-Slaney (1847–1908)
- James Parker Smith (1854–1929)
- Sir Alexander Fuller-Acland-Hood, Bt (1853–1917)

=== 1905 ===
- Sir Gorell Barnes (1848–1913)
- The Earl Cawdor (1847–1911)
- The Hon. Ailwyn Fellowes (1855–1924)
- Sir Arthur Nicolson, Bt. (1849–1928)
- Sir Edward Goschen (1847–1924)
- The Earl of Mansfield (1860–1906)
- The Lord Rayleigh (1842–1919)
- The Lord Tennyson (1852–1928)
- Sir Robert Finlay (1842–1929)
- Arthur Cohen (1830–1914)
- Sir Frederick Darley (1830–1910)
- John Atkinson (1844–1932)
- Edward Carson (1854–1935)
- Sir Alfred Wills (1828–1912)
- John Sandars (1853–1934)
- Victor Cavendish (1868–1938)
- Sir Charles Dalrymple, Bt (1839–1916)
- Amelius Lockwood (1847–1928)
- Sir Robert Reid (1846–1923)
- John Sinclair (1860–1925)
- David Lloyd George (1863–1945)
- John Burns (1858–1943)
- Augustine Birrell (1850–1933)
- Sydney Buxton (1853–1934)
- Lewis Harcourt (1863–1922)

=== 1906 ===
- The Earl of Liverpool (1846–1907)
- The Earl of Sefton (1871–1930)
- The Earl Beauchamp (1872–1938)
- Richard Causton (1843–1929)
- Thomas Shaw (1850–1937)
- Thomas Burt (1837–1922)
- Sir Walter Foster (1840–1913)
- John Ellis (1841–1910)
- The Duke of Manchester (1877–1947)
- The Lord Reay (1839–1921)
- Edmund Robertson (1845–1911)
- Henry Labouchère (1831–1912)
- Sir John Moulton (1844–1921)
- Sir Maurice de Bunsen (1852–1932)
- Sir George Farwell (1845–1915)
- Sir John Brunner, Bt (1842–1919)
- Sir James Kitson, Bt (1835–1911)
- Sir Francis Mowatt (1837–1919)
- Sir Cecil Clementi Smith (1840–1916)
- Robert Farquharson (1836–1918)
- George William Palmer (1851–1913)
- Sir Ernest Satow (1843–1929)
- Sir Henry Buckley (1845–1935)
- Sir Arthur Kekewich (1832–1907)
- Sir Claude Macdonald (1852–1915)

=== 1907 ===
- The Lord Sandhurst (1855–1921)
- Reginald McKenna (1863–1943)
- The Lord Allendale (1860–1923)
- Sir William Rann Kennedy (1846–1915)
- Winston Churchill (1874–1965)
- Sir Joseph Ward (1856–1930)
- Sir Leander Starr Jameson (1853–1917)
- Sir Frederick Moor (1853–1927)
- Louis Botha (1862–1919)
- Sir William Gurdon (1840–1911)
- Eugene Wason (1846–1927)
- Robert Spence Watson (1837–1911)
- The Lord Denman (1874–1954)
- The Earl of Granard (1874–1948)
- The Lord Farquhar (1844–1923)
- George Whiteley (1855–1925)
- William McEwan (1827–1913)
- Charles Stuart Parker (1829–1910)
- George W. E. Russell (1853–1919)
- Sir Charles Tupper, Bt (1821–1915)

=== 1908 ===
- The Lord FitzMaurice (1846–1935)
- Walter Runciman (1870–1949)
- Thomas Buchanan (1846–1911)
- Thomas Lough (1850–1922)
- Sir Gerard Lowther (1858–1916)
- Alfred Emmott (1858–1926)
- Sir Thomas Whittaker (1850–1919)
- Charles Milnes Gaskell (1842–1919)
- Sir Edward Hamilton (1847–1908)
- Sir John Edge (1841–1926)
- Sir Charles Fitzpatrick (1851–1942)
- The Earl Grey (1851–1917)
- Sir Fairfax Cartwright (1857–1928)
- Sir Rennell Rodd (1858–1941)
- Jack Pease (1860–1943)
- Herbert Samuel (1870–1963)
- Sir Charles McLaren, Bt (1850–1934)
- Sir Edward Clarke (1841–1931)

=== 1909 ===
- Cosmo Lang (1864–1945)
- The Lord Northcote (1846–1911)
- Sir John Bigham (1840–1929)
- Alexander Ure (1853–1928)
- Charles Hobhouse (1862–1941)
- Russell Rea (1846–1916)
- John X. Merriman (1841–1926)
- Sir Hudson Kearley, Bt (1856–1934)
- James Stuart (1843–1913)
- The Hon. Sir Walter Hely-Hutchinson (1849–1913)
- Sir Edward Seymour (1840–1929)
- Sir Edgar Speyer, Bt (1862–1932) Struck off 1921
- Sir Henry Roscoe (1833–1915)
- J. E. B. Seely (1868–1947)
- James Tomkinson (1840–1910)
- Syed Ameer Ali (1849–1928)

=== 1910 ===
- The Hon. Ivor Guest (1873–1939)
