= Claude MacDonald =

British Army officer and diplomat (1852–1915)

The Right Honourable Sir Claude MacDonald GCMG GCVO KCB
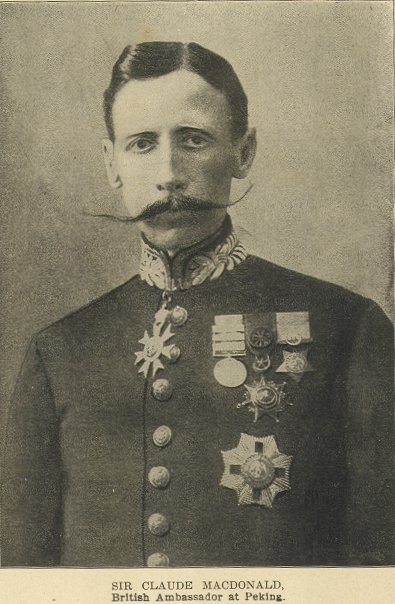
- Sir Claude MacDonald, c. 1900

British Ambassador to Japan (British Minister to Japan, 1900–1905)
- In office 1900–1912
- Monarchs: Victoria; Edward VII; George V
- Prime Minister: The Marquess of Salisbury; Arthur Balfour; Henry Campbell-Bannerman; H. H. Asquith
- Preceded by: Sir Ernest Mason Satow
- Succeeded by: Conyngham Greene

Personal details
- Born: 12 June 1852 Morar, Gwalior, India
- Died: 10 September 1915 (aged 63) London, England
- Resting place: Brookwood Cemetery; 51.297562°N 0.626209°W
- Spouse: Ethel Armstrong MacDonald (m. 1892)
- Parent(s): James Dawson and Mary Ellen Macdonald
- Education: Royal Military College, Sandhurst
- Occupation: Soldier, diplomat

Military service
- Allegiance: United Kingdom
- Branch/service: British Army
- Years of service: 1872–1896
- Rank: Colonel
- Unit: 74th Regiment of Foot
- Battles/wars: Anglo-Egyptian War; Mahdist War; Boxer Rebellion

Colonel Sir Claude Maxwell MacDonald, GCMG, GCVO, KCB, PC (12 June 1852 – 10 September 1915) was a British soldier and diplomat, best known for his service in China, Japan, and Korea.

== Early life ==
MacDonald was born the son of Mary Ellen MacDonald (nee Dougan) and Major-General James (Hamish) Dawson MacDonald. He was educated at Uppingham School and Sandhurst. He was commissioned into the 74th Foot in 1872. He thought of himself as a "soldier-outsider", as regards his subsequent career in the Foreign Office.

== Africa ==
MacDonald’s early career was in Africa. He served in the 1882 Anglo-Egyptian War, and served as military attaché to Sir Evelyn Baring from 1884 to 1887. From 1887 to 1889, he was Acting-Agent and Consul-general at Zanzibar, and then served some years as Commissioner and Consul-General at Brass in the West African Oil Rivers Protectorate, where in 1895 he was an observer of the rebellion of King Koko of Nembe. He retired from the British Army in 1896.

== China and Korea ==
In 1896, MacDonald was appointed Her Majesty's Minister in China. He was simultaneously the British Minister to the Empire of Korea in 1896 through 1898.

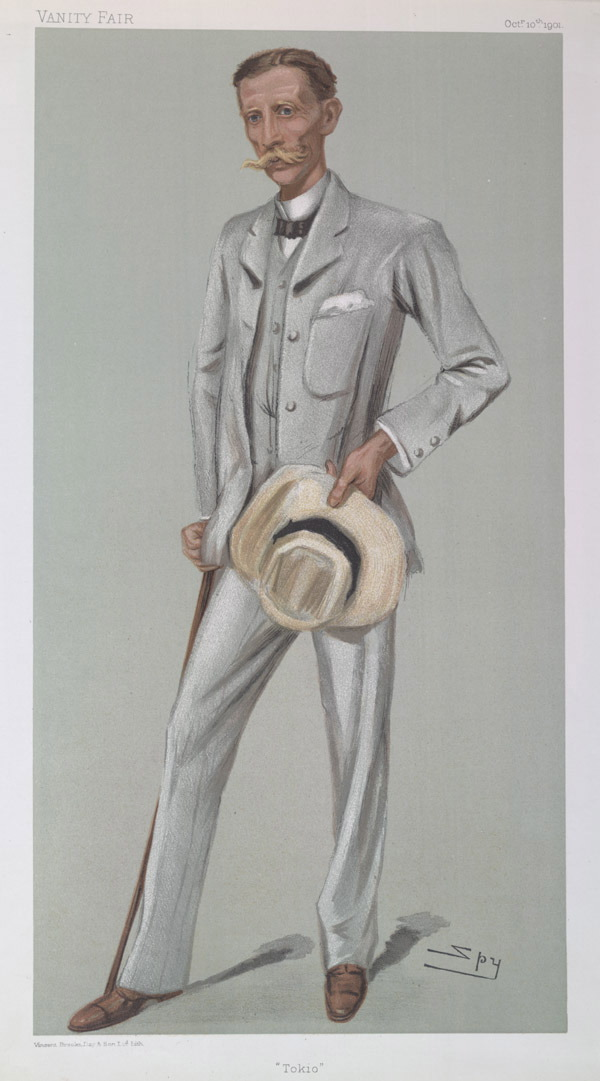
MacDonald caricatured by Spy for Vanity Fair, 1901

In China, MacDonald obtained a lease at Weihaiwei, and obtained railway contracts for British syndicates. He was instrumental in securing the Second Peking Convention, by which China leased to Britain the New Territories of Hong Kong. MacDonald secured a 99-year lease only because he thought it was "as good as forever". This and the contrasting lease-in-perpetuity of Kowloon created some problems in the negotiations for the 1984 Sino-British Joint Declaration.

In 1899 MacDonald was the author of a diplomatic note which he proposed, on behalf of British India, a boundary line between Jammu and Kashmir and the Chinese Turkestan, ceding roughly half of the Aksai Chin plateau, in return for China relinquishing its shadowy suzerainty over Hunza. The proposed boundary came to be known as the Macartney–MacDonald Line. The Qing China never made any response to the proposal. But the proposed boundary is still seen by scholars and commentators to have some relevance to the present day boundary disputes between China and India.

In the same year he also participated in the Sanmen Bay Affair on the side of the Kingdom of Italy on the United Kingdom's behalf.

As a military man, MacDonald led the defence of the foreign legations in 1900 which were under siege during the Boxer Rebellion, and he worked well with the Anglophile Japanese colonel Shiba Gorō.

== Japan ==
MacDonald was appointed Consul-General to the Empire of Japan in October 1900. He headed the British Legation in Tokyo during a period of harmonious relations between Britain and Japan (1900 to 1912), swapping appointments with Sir Ernest Satow who replaced him as Minister in Peking. On 30 January 1902, the first Anglo-Japanese Alliance was signed in London between the Foreign Secretary Lord Lansdowne and Hayashi Tadasu, the Japanese Minister.

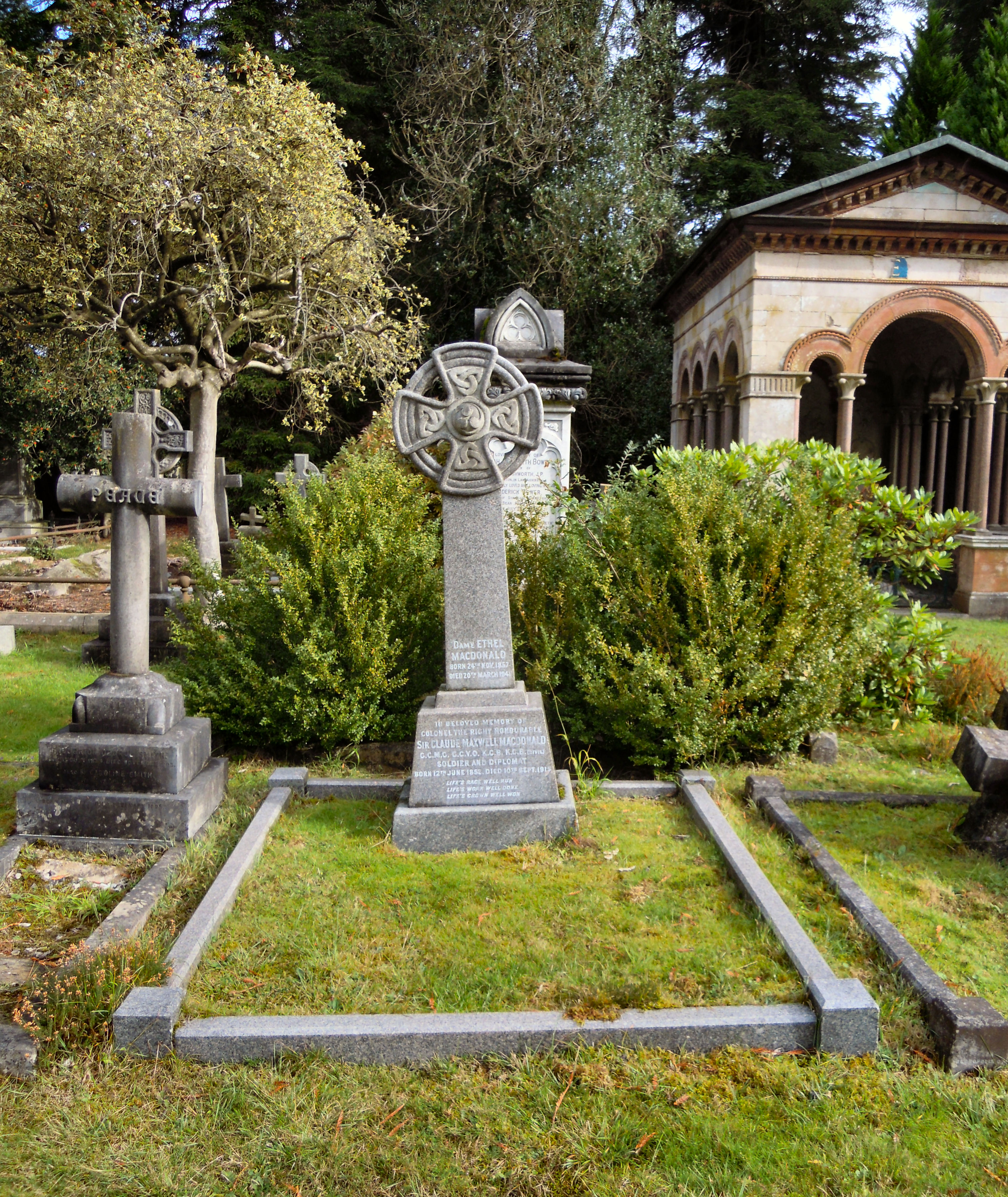
MacDonald's grave in Brookwood Cemetery

MacDonald was still in Tokyo when the alliance was renewed in 1905 and 1911. He became Britain's first ambassador to Japan when the status of the legation was raised to that of embassy in 1905. Before 1905 the senior British diplomat in Japan had simultaneously held the joint positions of (a) Consul-General and (b) Envoy Extraordinary and Minister Plenipotentiary; the latter being a rank just below that of ambassador. MacDonald was made a Privy Councillor in 1906.

He died of heart failure at his residence in London on 10 September 1915. He is buried with his wife in Brookwood Cemetery.

== Ethel, Lady MacDonald, DBE ==
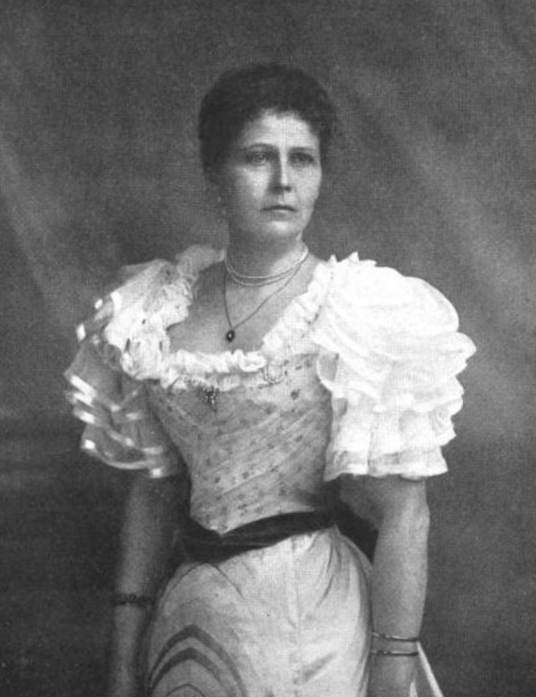
Ethel Armstrong MacDonald in The Sketch, 11 July 1900

MacDonald married in 1892 Ethel Armstrong (1857–1941), daughter of Major W. Cairns Armstrong and widow of P. Craigie Robertson; they remained married until his death in 1915. They had two daughters.

Lady MacDonald was awarded the Royal Red Cross (RRC) on 24 February 1903 ′in recognition of her services in tending the sick and wounded soldiers during the defence of the Legations at Pekin in 1900′, during the Boxer Rebellion. She was a Member of the Executive Committee of the Overseas Nursing Association, and was named Dame Commander of the Order of the British Empire (DBE) in her own right in 1935.

== Selected works ==
MacDonald's writings include:

- 1898 — Despatch from Her Majesty's minister at Peking forwarding copies of the notes exchanged with the Chinese government respecting the non-alienation of the Yang-tsze region
- 1900 — The Japanese detachment during the defence of the Peking legations, 1900
- 1900 — Reports from Her Majesty's minister in China [Sir C. M. Macdonald] respecting events at Peking. Presented to parliament, Dec. 1900

== Honours ==
- Knight Grand Cross of the Order of St Michael and St George (GCMG).
- Knight Grand Cross of the Royal Victorian Order (GCVO).
- Knight Commander of the Order of the Bath (KCB; Civil division).
- Knight Commander of the Order of the Bath (KCB; Military division) – awarded on 29 November 1900 "in recognition of services during the recent Operations in China".
- Egypt Medal (1882–1889) with clasps "Suakin 1884", "El-Teb" and "Tamaai".
- Order of Osmanieh, Fourth Class (Ottoman Empire).
- Khedive's Star (Khedivate of Egypt)

== See also ==
- List of Privy Counsellors (1901–1910)
- Anglo-Chinese relations
- Anglo-Japanese relations

== Notes ==
Diplomatic posts
Preceded by William Nelthorpe Beauclerk as Chargé d'affaires	British Minister to China; 1896–1900	Succeeded by Sir Ernest Satow
Preceded by Sir Nicholas O'Conor	British Minister to Korea; 1896–1898	Succeeded by John Jordan as Chargé d'affaires
Preceded by Sir Ernest Satow	British Minister to Japan; 1900–1905	Succeeded by Himself as Ambassador to Japan
Preceded by Himself as Minister to Japan	British Ambassador to Japan; 1905–1912	Succeeded by Sir Conyngham Greene
