= Memorial Hall of the Boxer Uprising =

Coordinates: 39.086062°N 117.201532°E

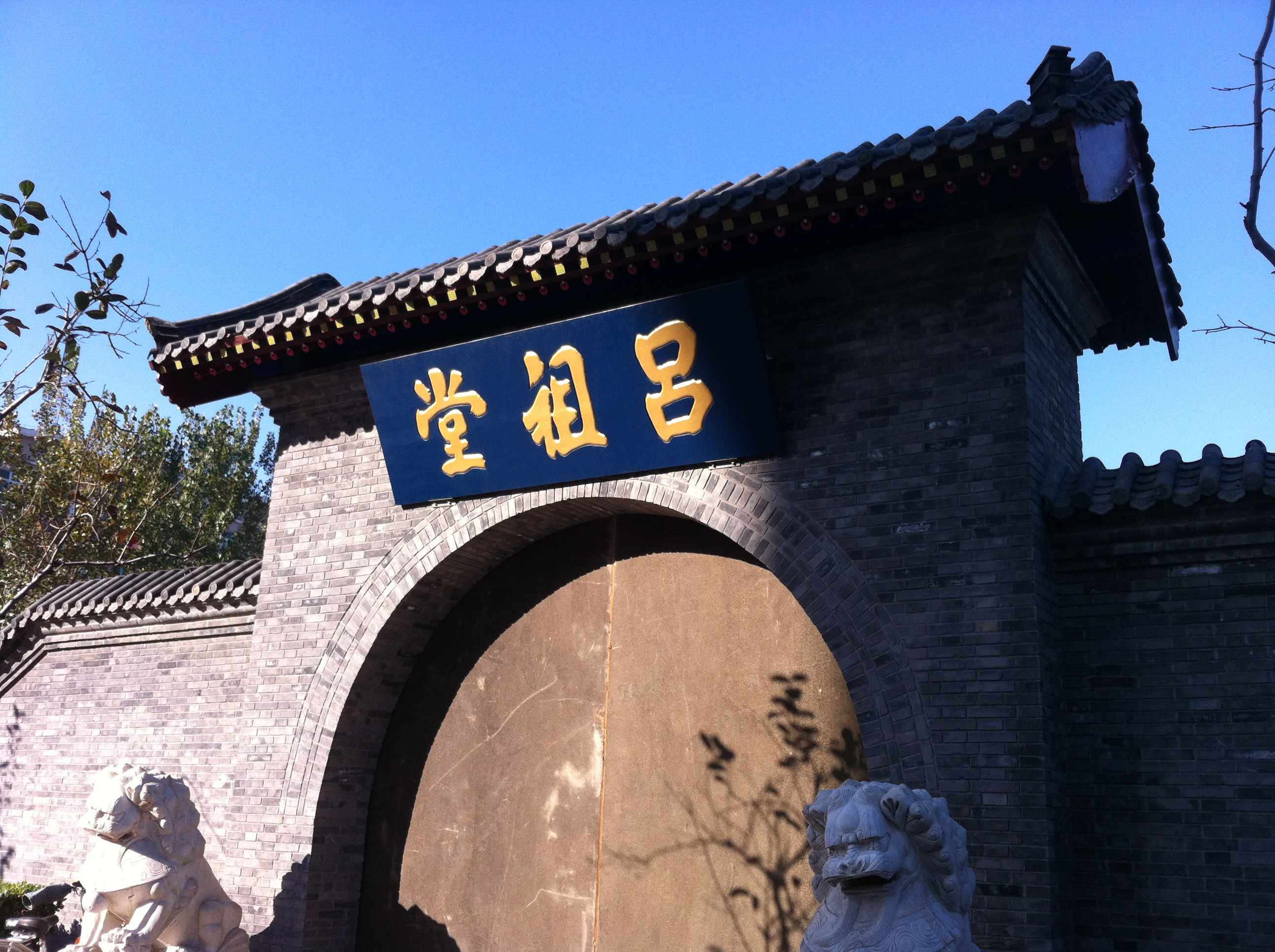
- Alternative names: Lüzutang

General information
- Address: 18 Hejia Lane, Ruyyi'an Street
- Town or city: Tianjin
- Country: China
- Opened: 1985
- Renovated: Kangxi period, 1985

The Memorial Hall of the Boxer Uprising (天津义和团纪念馆) in Tianjin is the only museum dedicated to the Boxer Rebellion in China. Also known as the Tianjin Boxer Rebellion Memorial, Luzutang Museum, or simply the Boxer Museum, it is located No.18 Hejia Lane, Ruyi'an Street, Hongqiao District, in Tianjin.

== History ==
The building was originally a Taoist Temple, built in 1719. Sacrifices were held to honour the immortal Lü Dongbin. During the Kangxi period of the Qing dynasty, the temple was rebuilt and named "Lüzutang" (吕祖堂).

In 1900, during the Boxer Rebellion, Boxer leader Cao Futian set his headquarters in the old temple. An altar was built at the temple's main entrance. The Boxer leaders would burn charms, and followers would then drink the ashes mixed in strong wine. They believed this could summon gods and ancient heroes and make them possess their body, rendering them resistant to the bullets fired by the Eight-Nation Alliance. The Red Lanterns supposedly stared at the setting sun to gain the ability to invoke lightning.

In 1985, the building was restored and renamed Tianjin Boxer Rebellion Memorial Hall.

== Today ==
The museum is still currently open. Exhibitions are held concerning the Boxer rebellion history and the Boxer leaders and organisation.
