= Red Lanterns (Boxer Uprising) =

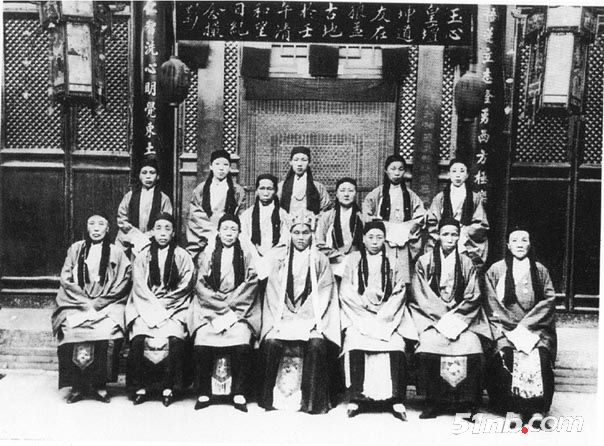
- Active: 1890s–1901
- Country: Qing Empire
- Allegiance: Boxers
- Engagements: Boxer Rebellion

Commanders
- Notable commanders: Lin Hei'er

The Red Lanterns (traditional Chinese: 紅燈照; simplified Chinese: 红灯照; pinyin: Hóng Dēng Zhào) were a women's fighting group organized during the Boxer Uprising of 1900. Villagers said these women had supernatural powers which helped to protect the male Boxers and fight against foreign enemies.

== Background ==
Unlike the Taiping rebels but like many Chinese folk sects such as the White Lotus Sect, Boxer ideology forbade contact with women. Boxer discipline in its strictest form did not allow sexual contact with or even looking at a woman for fear that the female's polluting yin would destroy the invulnerability ritual.

Women organized parallel units to the Boxers: The Red Lanterns (Hongdeng zhao, i.e. "Red Lanterns Shining") for younger women, "Blue Lanterns" (Landeng zhao) for middle-aged women, and Black Lanterns (Heideng zhao) for elderly women. Red Lanterns were anywhere from eleven to seventeen years old.

It is likely that the Red Lanterns had little day-to-day contact with the Boxers. Due to the negative associations with childbirth, adult Chinese women were seen as polluted or ritually unclean. Their young age, combined with limited access to a reliable food source, meant that most Red Lanterns were likely premenstrual, or presumed to be by the community. Their special powers were deemed to be a result of this pure prepubescent and pre-childbirth state. Another argument speculates that their power was greater than the Boxers because "women, though polluted (or perhaps, because polluted), possessed extraordinary powers." Nevertheless, because they were young women, their powers were generally seen as less fallible than the Boxers'.

Regardless of the reasons for their powers, these young women were able to live outside of traditional Confucian expectations. For example, the Red Lanterns did not set their hair in the traditional way and did not bind their feet. They wore red coats and trousers, red hats, and red shoes, and each carried a red lantern.

== Activities in 1900 ==
The Red Lanterns were trained for up to five months in order to cultivate their powers. The new Red Lanterns would practice walking on water through chanting incantations. With enough practice on the pond, they would be able to take flight. In addition, they were trained in sword fighting and fan waving.

They were said to be able to leap up to heaven when they waved their red fans. They are mentioned as being able to walk on water, fly, set fire to Christians' homes, and stop their guns, powers which the male Boxers themselves did not claim. Other accounts claim that the Red Lanterns could control the strength and direction of the wind as they flew.

A folk song had it:

Wearing all red,
Carrying a small red lantern,
Woosh, with a wave of the fan
Up they fly to heaven.

Reliable accounts of Red Lantern activities are hard to find. Similar to the Boxers, reports of their magic come from second or third-hand accounts. The only good accounts of their actual activities come from the Battle of Tientsin, when they nursed wounded Boxers and did work such as sewing and cleaning.

These young women also had the power to protect the Boxers who were fighting the invaders. One former Boxer recalled in an oral history in the 1950s that "a brother-disciple," that is, a fellow Boxer, "would hold a piece of rope in his hand.... and direct the fighting. The Boxers would fight down below, while the Red Lanterns would watch from above, appearing suspended in the sky, no larger than a chicken's egg." These Red Lanterns could throw swords through the air and lop off the heads of the invaders, as well as remove the screws from their cannons. When the Red Lanterns stood still, they could send their souls into battle. They had the ability to freeze foreign guns in action.

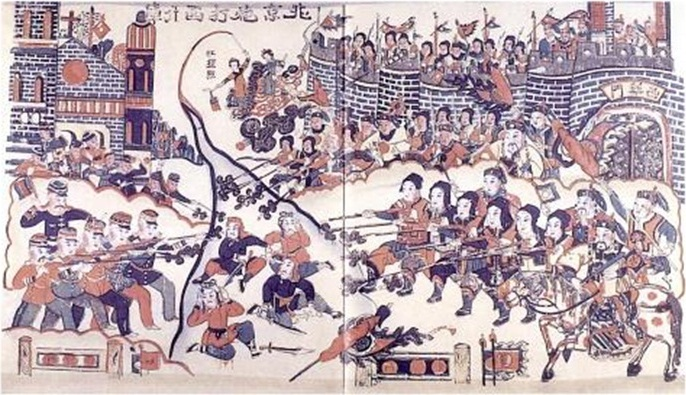
Some historians, such as Joseph Esherick, interpret this image of the Siege at Beicang Cathedral as the Red Lanterns being protected during the attack on Northern Cathedral in the center of the image. Other scholars, such as Jane Elliot and Paul Cohen, see this image as some Red Lanterns protecting the Boxers and other Red Lanterns with a magical rope or balloon-like device.

The Red Lanterns were also famous for their healing powers. In the 1950s, a former Red Lantern told another oral history project of the senior "sister disciple" who could go into a trance, clap her hands in the direction of a sick person, and cure the illness. Another Red Lantern, the Holy Mother of the Yellow Lotus, had the reputation of being able to heal wounds by sprinkling clear water on them and even bringing the dead back to life by rubbing their bodies.

When Boxer magic failed, women frequently took the blame. For instance, when Beijing's Church of the Saviour withstood weeks of attack by explosives and fire, the Boxers blamed this failure on the Catholic women inside, who were said to expose themselves and wave "dirty things," causing the spirits of the Boxers to leave their bodies. The answer was to await the arrival of the Red Lanterns: "The Red Lanterns are all girls and young women, so they do not fear dirty things."

In the years following the defeat of the Boxers, villagers traded stories concerning their exploits. One told of Red Lantern women appearing at buildings in Tianjin which the Qing armies could not capture from the foreigners. They caught the bullets from the foreign guns in their flower baskets and scattered them to set the buildings afire, forcing the French and Japanese soldiers to flee. Other village stories spread an egalitarian message of sharing wealth equally and opposing the monarchy. One was that after they attacked the Foreign Legations, the Red Lanterns spread the slogan of killing "a dragon, a tiger, and three hundred rams." The dragon was the emperor, the tiger was Prince Qing, and the three hundred rams were the officials of the central government.

Beyond their supernatural powers, the Red Lanterns also provided operations assistance to the Boxers. It is alleged that they apprehended spies, served as lookouts, transmitted news, and gathered intelligence on the enemy. During battles, they would take care of the wounded, help prepare meals, boil water, and carry provisions.

== Notable leaders and members ==
=== Lin Hei'er: Huanglien Shengmu (Holy Mother of the Yellow Lotus) ===
Leaders of the Red Lanterns were called by similar titles to the Boxers, namely "'Senior Sister-Disciple' (da shijie) and 'Second Sister-Disciple' (er shijie).'"

Lin Hei'er, more commonly known as Huanglien Shengmu (Holy Mother of the Yellow Lotus), is the most well-known leader of the Red Lanterns. One account tells that Lin Hei'er became involved in anti-foreign activities after her husband, Li You, was jailed in 1900 and later died following a conflict with a foreigner. A different account suggests that her father-in-law was imprisoned, not her husband. In either case, her rebellious activities were inspired by the imprisonment and subsequent death of a loved one after a bad encounter with a foreigner. She traveled to Tianjin with Boxer leader Zhang Decheng where she began assembling women to form the Red Lanterns. On a slat boat along the Grand Canal, she flew a flag saying Holy Mother of the Yellow Lotus. Here, it was reported that she created an altar, attracted women to join the Red Lanterns, and cured the sick.

Huanglien Shengmu was involved in many aspects of the Boxer Rebellion, including healing the sick and wounded, crafting battle plans, and leading the Red Lanterns in battle. Her powers were greater than other Red Lanterns and included the ability to undo screws on foreign cannons. She also possessed the unique ability to heal the wounded by sprinkling clear water on them and could restore life to the dead by rubbing their bodies. It is alleged that she led the Red Lanterns into battle at Laolongtou Station and Zizhuling. Notably, these battles are rare instances of women fighting alongside men.

It is remembered that Huanglien Shengmu garnered respect for the Red Lanterns after a confrontation with Zhili Governor-General Yulu. Yulu was resistant to Boxer intervention against foreigners. After resisting Boxer efforts even when fighting had already begun in Tianjin, Huanglien Shengmu confronted him. She argued for his support and condemned him for his opposition to the Boxers. In a triumphant success, he conceded to the Boxers and promised his future support to the Rebellion. Historian Paul Cohen notes that Huanglien Shengmu's confrontation is significant because she was both a working-class person talking up to a ruling-class person, and also a female in a highly patriarchal society talking down to a male with unusual success.

In a battle at Tianjin in July 1900, Huanglien Shengmu was captured and executed. She was reported to die a calm and stoic death, which inspired the witnesses to her execution. Her legacy prevailed, as foreign enemies would flee when red lanterns were put up on the boats along the Grand Canal in fear of her power.

=== Azure Cloud ===
Another prominent member of the Red Lanterns was Azure Cloud, a young village woman who was said to be able to jump ten feet in the air as an expert in martial arts. She developed a deep hatred of foreigners. The legend had it that when the International Expedition entered Beijing, she killed many of the invaders. When Boxer leaders turned into collaborators and committed unspeakable crimes, Azure Cloud invited these traitors for a banquet. She denounced them: "I would never have believed you could be such beasts. It is your fault that the country is on the verge of collapse." She then executed them and disappeared without a trace. A village song bragged:

The red lantern shines,
Lighting the path for the people.

== In legend and history ==
In the late Qing period, the Boxers and Red Lanterns were remembered unfavorably by some of the educated Chinese elite for their religious and magical claims. Yet at the same time, the general public largely supported the groups.

Academic histories in China mentioned the Red Lanterns only in passing, even after 1949, when the Boxer movement was considered a patriotic uprising of the masses. Suddenly in 1967, the Red Lanterns surged as a trending topic in the Chinese national media. The Cultural Revolution was at its most radical phase, and the radical student youth groups, the Red Guards, reached the heights of their fervor. Parallels between the Red Lanterns and the Red Guards heightened their popularity in the media. Their ability to repel foreign attacks meshed well with Chairman Mao's revolutionary agenda. Coincidences like their three-syllable names, use of the color red, and the fact that each group was largely composed of young and rebellious individuals heightened the similarities. One Red Guard group even chose the name "Red Lantern Fighting Force."

The Model Revolutionary Opera, The Legend of the Red Lantern, produced by Mao Zedong's wife, Jiang Qing, had no connection to the Boxer movement, but popularized the Red Lantern into a revolutionary symbol. A campaign in official Party newspapers saw a direct connection with the Red Lanterns of 1900. Official editorials attacked Liu Shaoqi, Mao's former second in command, for detesting the Boxers, and called upon the Red Guards to carry on the spirit of the Red Lanterns.

From 1974 to 1976 the Red Lanterns experienced a resurgence in an anti-Confucian campaign. For stepping outside the boundaries of Confucian gender roles, the Red Lanterns became symbols of revolt against Confucian ethical standards. The campaign attempted to eradicate the subordination of women, aversion to physical labor, and other issues associated with Confucianism. The Red Lanterns were also used as a symbol of female emancipation. Contemporaries looked to their defiance of Confucian moral codes as evidence of historical women fighting for liberation from traditional Chinese gender roles. In particular, the movement idolized Huanglien Shengmu as a symbol of patriotism and women's emancipation.

The Red Lanterns appear as antagonists in the Hong Kong martial arts film Once Upon a Time in China IV (1993).

== See also ==
- Secret society
