= Jinghai, Tianjin =

Jinghai 静海区 Tsinghai
- District
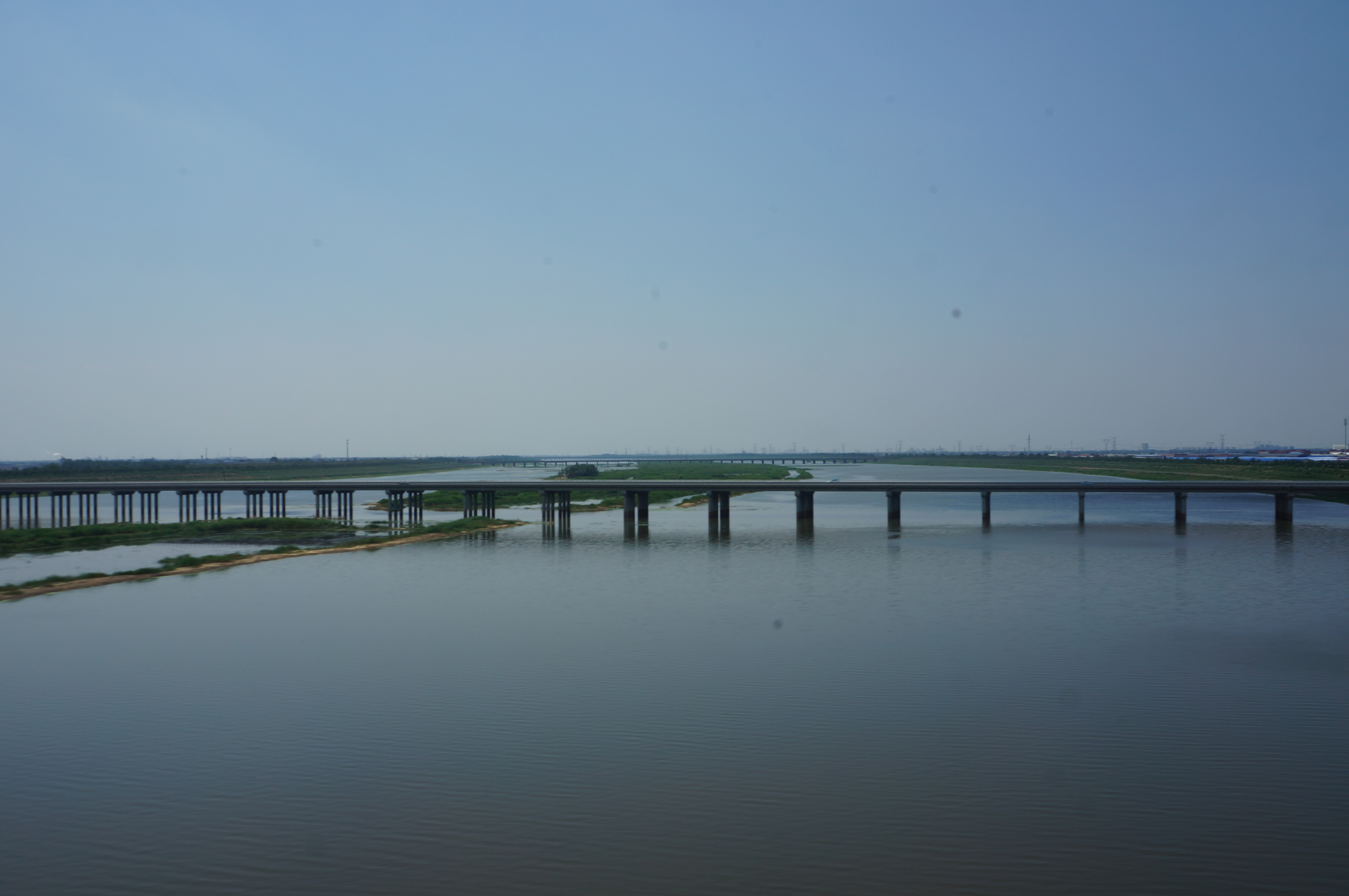
- Daqing River in Jinghai
- Interactive map of Jinghai
- Country: People's Republic of China
- Municipality: Tianjin
- Township-level divisions: 16 towns 2 townships
- District seat: Jinghai Town (静海镇)

Area
  - Total: 1,476 km^{2} (570 sq mi)
- Elevation: 5 m (16 ft)

Population (2020 census)
  - Total: 787,106
  - Density: 533.3/km^{2} (1,381/sq mi)
- Time zone: UTC+8 (China Standard)
- Postal code: 301600
- Area code: 0022
Tianjin district map
Subdivisions of Tianjin
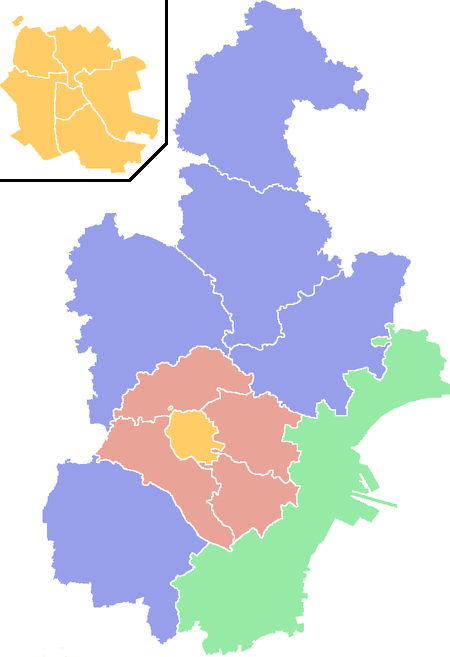
Core districts See inset
1	Heping
2	Hedong
3	Hexi
4	Nankai
5	Hebei
6	Hongqiao
Suburbs
7	Dongli
8	Xiqing
9	Jinnan
10	Beichen
Binhai and Rural
13	Binhai	14	Ninghe
11	Wuqing	15	Jinghai
12	Baodi	16	Ji Zhou

Jinghai District (simplified Chinese: 静海区; traditional Chinese: 靜海區; pinyin: Jìnghǎi Qū) is a district of the municipality of Tianjin, People's Republic of China, located in the southwest portion of the municipality, bordering Hebei province to the south and west, Xiqing District to the north and northeast, and Binhai to the east. It is the birthplace of Huo Yuanjia.

== Administrative divisions ==
There are 16 towns and 2 townships in the district:

Name	Chinese (S)	Hanyu Pinyin	Population (2010)	Area (km^{2})
Jinghai town	静海镇	Jìnghǎi Zhèn	154,325	6.2
Duliu town	独流镇	Dúliú Zhèn	36,490	27.2
Taitou town	台头镇	Táitóu Zhèn	22,794	35
Wangkou town	王口镇	Wángkǒu Zhèn	32,622	92.6
Liangtou town	梁头镇	Liángtóu Zhèn	24,832	96.7
Xizhaizhuang town	西翟庄镇	Xīdízhuāng Zhèn	13,310	85.4
Dafengdui town	大丰堆镇	Dàfēngduī Zhèn	16,105	70.1
Tangguantun town	唐官屯镇	Tángguāntún Zhèn	44,167	113
Zhongwang town	中旺镇	Zhōngwàng Zhèn	31,128	67
Shuangtang town	双塘镇	Shuāngtáng Zhèn	16,656	42.6
Yanzhuang town	沿庄镇	Yánzhuāng Zhèn	33,181	32
Ziya town	子牙镇	Ziyá Zhèn	31,757	57.4
Tuanbo town	团泊镇	Tuánpō Zhèn	18,299	54.6
Daqiuzhuang town	大邱庄镇	Dàqiūzhuāng Zhèn	72,194	7.2
Caigongzhuang town	蔡公庄镇	Càigōngzhuāng Zhèn	21,498	108.2
Chenguantun town	陈官屯镇	Chénguāntún Zhèn	29,237	92.5
Liangwangzhuang Township	良王庄乡	Liángwángzhuāng Xiāng	20,706	38
Yangchengzhuang Township	杨成庄乡	Yángchéngzhuāng Xiāng	24,987	68.9
industrial zones			2,690	

== Climate ==
Climate data for Jinghai District, elevation 6 m (20 ft), (1991–2020 normals, extremes 1981–present)
Month	Jan	Feb	Mar	Apr	May	Jun	Jul	Aug	Sep	Oct	Nov	Dec	Year
Record high °C (°F)	14.7 (58.5)	23.9 (75.0)	30.9 (87.6)	33.6 (92.5)	38.6 (101.5)	39.8 (103.6)	41.6 (106.9)	37.4 (99.3)	35.6 (96.1)	31.2 (88.2)	23.4 (74.1)	14.9 (58.8)	41.6 (106.9)
Mean daily maximum °C (°F)	2.4 (36.3)	6.4 (43.5)	13.5 (56.3)	21.3 (70.3)	27.4 (81.3)	31.2 (88.2)	32.1 (89.8)	30.8 (87.4)	26.9 (80.4)	20.0 (68.0)	10.8 (51.4)	3.9 (39.0)	18.9 (66.0)
Daily mean °C (°F)	−2.9 (26.8)	0.6 (33.1)	7.2 (45.0)	14.9 (58.8)	21.2 (70.2)	25.4 (77.7)	27.3 (81.1)	26.1 (79.0)	21.3 (70.3)	14.1 (57.4)	5.5 (41.9)	−1.1 (30.0)	13.3 (55.9)
Mean daily minimum °C (°F)	−6.9 (19.6)	−3.8 (25.2)	2.2 (36.0)	9.2 (48.6)	15.3 (59.5)	20.4 (68.7)	23.3 (73.9)	22.2 (72.0)	16.6 (61.9)	9.3 (48.7)	1.3 (34.3)	−4.9 (23.2)	8.7 (47.6)
Record low °C (°F)	−17.8 (0.0)	−16.2 (2.8)	−8.6 (16.5)	−1.0 (30.2)	4.7 (40.5)	9.6 (49.3)	16.2 (61.2)	14.1 (57.4)	5.4 (41.7)	−2.7 (27.1)	−10.3 (13.5)	−19.1 (−2.4)	−19.1 (−2.4)
Average precipitation mm (inches)	2.6 (0.10)	6.0 (0.24)	9.2 (0.36)	21.9 (0.86)	37.7 (1.48)	76.1 (3.00)	158.9 (6.26)	111.6 (4.39)	51.1 (2.01)	32.1 (1.26)	13.2 (0.52)	2.5 (0.10)	522.9 (20.58)
Average precipitation days (≥ 0.1 mm)	1.4	2.2	3.1	4.4	6.0	8.6	11.3	9.4	6.1	4.8	3.2	2.0	62.5
Average snowy days	3.2	2.3	1.0	0.1	0	0	0	0	0	0	1.6	3.5	11.7
Average relative humidity (%)	53	50	47	48	52	60	73	75	68	62	60	56	59
Mean monthly sunshine hours	164.7	173.8	225.4	244.7	267.4	226.7	199.4	200.0	205.5	195.4	160.0	156.8	2,419.8
Percentage possible sunshine	54	57	61	61	60	51	44	48	56	57	54	54	55
Source: China Meteorological Administrationall-time February high
