= Zhang Decheng =

Chinese nationalist (1846–1900)

- 张德成
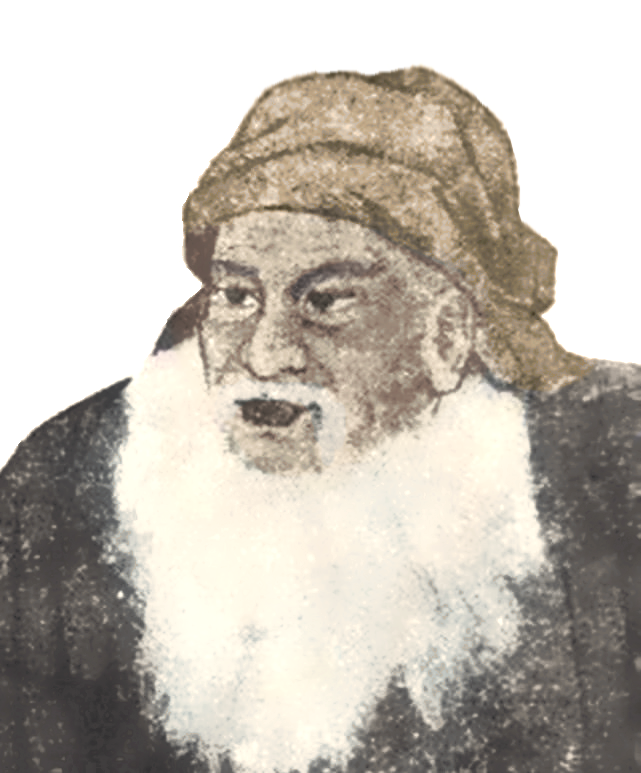
- Born: 1846; Qing Empire
- Died: mid-July, 1900 (aged 53–54)
- Military career
- Allegiance: Boxer movement
- Nickname: Number One Boxer
- Conflicts: Boxer Rebellion: Siege of the International Legations †
- Memorials: Memorial Hall of the Boxer Uprising

Zhang Decheng (simplified Chinese: 张德成; traditional Chinese: 張德成; pinyin: Zhāng Déchéng; also romanized as Chang De-Cheng; 1846 – late-July 1900) was a Chinese nationalist and leader of the Society of Righteous and Harmonious Fists during the Boxer Uprising.

== Career ==
Born in either Zhaozhang (Note: Now part of Wangdu County, Baoding City, Hebei Province.) or Goucun village (part of modern-day Gaobeidian) in Zhili Province, Zhang would spend much of his life working as a boatman along the Daqing, Ziya, and other rivers in Zhili.

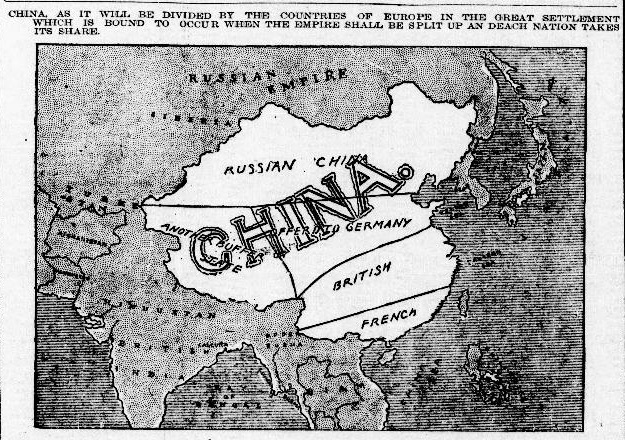
The type of foreign influence in China that Zhang was actively preparing for

As time went on and foreign contacts in Northern China increased, particularly the actions of Western missionaries, Zhang and other similar-minded individuals would set out to "destroy foreigners". Though the Fists of Harmony and Justice did exist during the mid-1890s, they proved only to be a minor inconvenience to any official Qing or foreign affairs due to the group's small size, lack of influence, and mostly local actions taken by bands of around 50 men each. In 1899, a compatriot of Zhang, Zhao Sanduo set out to establish order in the Fists of Harmony and Justice's ranks during a conference at the Yaoli Yaowang Temple in Wangkou. Both Zhang Decheng and Cao Futian would develop the creation of the First Heavenly Regiment, along with the structure of their organization, which was as follows:

Position	Person (people)
Number One Boxer (de facto)	Zhang Decheng
Number Two Boxer (de facto)	Cao Futian
Master	Liu Liansheng
Second Brother	Gao Shunyi
Third Brother	Zhang Eryou
Fourth Brother	Wang Dahu
Fifth Brother	Lu Lian
Sixth Brother/Martial Arts Trainer	Dong Deyu
Minister of Culture	Liu Zinian, Wu Xiangchen
Minister of Military	Wang Yushu
Minister of Announcements and Bulletins	Wu Tiaowen, Jie Tieji

Though a central structure for the organization was formed, the Boxers still relied on a system of small groups of men under local leaders, which were to be replaced (in some capacity) by the new First Heavenly Regiment. To acquire more members for the newly-created group, Zhang began trying to convince Boxer followers that he had magical abilities. He supposedly hid a knife in the ground somewhere in Tianjin, and then claimed that the place was "dangerous". His followers then dug up the area and found the knife, and were convinced that Zhang did indeed possess supernatural powers. In early 1900, he proclaimed himself "Number One Boxer" and said he had a mandate from the gods. He led at that time several thousand followers.

In early June 1900, Zhang Decheng went to see the Viceroy of Zhili, Yulu. He presented himself to him as the founder of the Boxer movement, and the viceroy promised to provide the Boxers with money and equipment.

For many, he was considered the supreme Boxer leader.

== Demise ==
When the Eight-Nation Alliance attacked Dagu, (Note: Now part of Binhai, Tianjin.) Zhang Decheng led 5,000 soldiers on 10 wooden boats to Tianjin and attacked the railway station occupied by the Alliance forces along with Cao Futian. The Viceroy of Zhili invited them to his office to discuss the defense of Tianjin with Nie Shicheng and Ma Yukun. On July 13, more than 10,000 troops of the Eight-Nation Alliance attacked Tianjin. Zhang Decheng commanded the local militia along with a group of Qing Dynasty troops to participate in the defense of the South Gate. On the 14th, Tianjin fell. Zhang Decheng led his followers to plunder military supplies and then fled from Beijing.

In August, Zhang Decheng led a number of followers to Wangjiakou (now Wangkou), a strategic location, hoping to collect food and supplies from wealthy households. Local landlords and officials showed unusual enthusiasm. They handed over provisions and donated large sums of money to the Boxer Rebellion, hoping that Zhang Decheng and his troops would leave soon to prevent the war from spreading to the area. On their way out, they were ambushed by armed groups from the Red Spear Society, led by a petty merchant named Liu Yihe, and robbed back at Wangjiakou. As a result, the Boxers were routed, Zhang Decheng was killed, and his body was thrown into the Ziya River.

"Anecdotes about the Boxer Rebellion" by Luo Dunrong and the unofficial history book "Secret History of the Qing Dynasty" by Lu Shi'e tell a different story. It was said that Zhang Decheng fled to Wangjiakou and demanded that the salt merchants there supply him with provisions. The salt merchants held a banquet for him, but Decheng feigned dissatisfaction, complaining that the food was unclean, then pushed the table aside and stood up, cursing loudly. The salt merchants could no longer tolerate him. Local villagers also became extremely angry. They rushed in, seized Decheng, and chopped him into mincemeat.
