= Shiba Gorō =

Japanese samurai and general (1860–1945)

- 柴 五郎
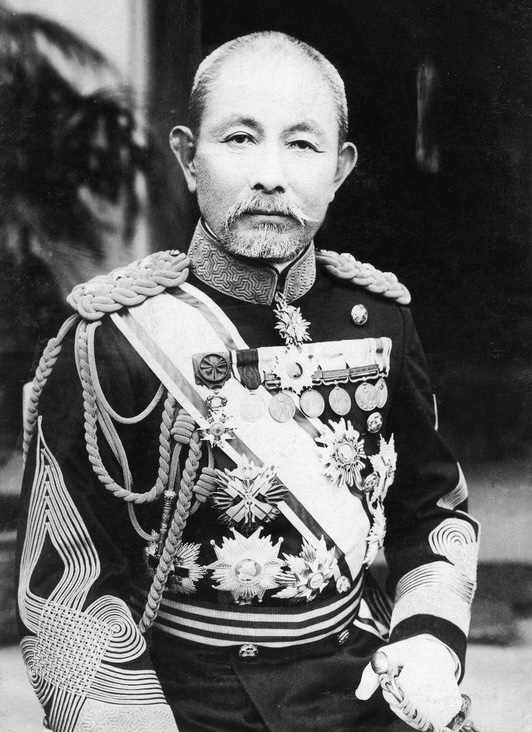
- Born: June 21, 1860; Aizuwakamatsu, Mutsu Province, Japan
- Died: December 13, 1945 (aged 85); Tokyo, Japan
- Military career
- Allegiance: Japan
- Branch: Imperial Japanese Army
- Service years: 1873–1930
- Rank: General
- Commands: IJA 12th Division, Taiwan Army of Japan
- Conflicts: First Sino-Japanese War; Spanish–American War (observing); Boxer Rebellion; Russo-Japanese War; World War I

Shiba Gorō (柴 五郎; June 21, 1860 – December 13, 1945) was a samurai of Aizu Domain and later a career officer and general in the Meiji period Imperial Japanese Army.

== Biography ==
=== Early life ===
The 5th son of a 250 koku Aizu samurai Shiba Satazō, Shiba Gorō witnessed the events of the Boshin War as a child when Aizu was attacked by the imperial forces in 1868. During the siege of Aizuwakamatsu Castle, his grandmother, mother, and two sisters committed suicide so that the men in the family could do battle without distractions. Aizuwakamatsu Castle later fell to the forces of the new Meiji government and the domain surrendered.

The ex-samurai of Aizu were exiled by the Meiji government to the newly-created Tonami Domain, located in far northeastern Aomori Prefecture. Shiba initially worked in the new territory to help establish a han school and a new government building, but with the abolition of the han system, he moved to Tokyo and enlisted in the fledgling Imperial Japanese Army in 1873. He was in the 1877 class of the Imperial Japanese Army Academy, where his classmates included a number of men who later rose to considerable prominence, including Uehara Yūsaku, Akiyama Yoshifuru, and Hongo Fusataro. He was commissioned as a second lieutenant in the artillery in 1879.

=== Military career ===
After graduation, Shiba commanded the 4th Platoon of the Osaka Garrison Artillery in 1881. In February 1883, he was assigned to the Guards Artillery Regiment. After attending the Army Artillery School in 1884, he was promoted to lieutenant. In October of the same year, he was sent as a military attaché to the Chinese Empire and was stationed in Fuzhou, followed by Beijing. In November 1888, he was promoted to captain, and commander of the Guards Artillery Regiment. He became an instructor at the Army Academy in May 1890 and served in the Second Bureau of the Imperial Japanese Army General Staff from February 1892. In March 1894, he was sent as a military attaché to the United Kingdom, but returned to Japan in August and was promoted to major in November. He served in the First Sino-Japanese War from April 1895, but returned to the United Kingdom in September of the same year.

Shiba was then sent as a military observer to the United States and was introduced to United States Secretary of War Russell A. Alger, who agreed to having Shiba embedded within the US 5th Army Corps commanded by Major General William Rufus Shafter during the Spanish–American War. After inspecting training camps in Chattanooga, Tennessee, he landed in Cuba with the American Army and was present throughout the Siege of Santiago and subsequent attack on Puerto Rico. He returned to Japan in August 1899 and was promoted to lieutenant colonel the following month.

In March 1900, Shiba returned to Beijing as a military attaché, and was thus present at the Japanese legation during the Boxer Rebellion. There his small force fought tenaciously and suffered almost 100% casualties over a 60 day period. He served with distinction during that campaign, aided by his prior knowledge of Beijing and by a large network of local spies. He protected the citizens and diplomats alongside several Western powers during the siege, and was subsequently awarded decorations by many of the western nations in the Eight-Nation Alliance. His name was also mentioned in The Times.

In March 1901, he was returned to Japan and attached to the General Staff. In June 1901 Shiba was appointed commander of the IJA 15th Field Artillery Regiment, which he continued to command after the start of the Russo-Japanese War in 1904, where he was awarded the Order of the Golden Kite (2nd class), for bravery in battle. He was later sent as military attaché to the United Kingdom in March 1906.

Shiba was promoted to major general in March 1907. In December 1908, he was assigned command of Sasebo Fortress. After serving as commander of the IJA 2nd Heavy Artillery Brigade in August 1909, he returned to Beijing as an envoy of the Imperial Japanese Army General Staff in December 1911. In September 1912, he became commander of the IJA 1st Heavy Artillery Brigade and was promoted to lieutenant general in August 1913. This assignment was considered a demotion, possibly because Shiba had never graduated from the Army Staff College, or because of his Aizu background; however in May 1914, he was given command of the IJA 12th Division.

He was chosen to accompany Prince Higashifushimi Yorihito to England in June 1918. After his return to Japan in January 1919, he was briefly placed in command of the Taiwan Army before going into the reserves.

=== Death and legacy ===
Shiba retired in April 1930. In 1942 during World War 2, he was the only surviving sibling, a widower (married two times) and several of his grandchildren are dead. Shiba sent his memoirs to an editor Ishimtsu Mahito, son of Shiba's friend in the Army Cadet School, to improve his writing style. Following the surrender of Japan in August 1945, Shiba attempted suicide. He died of his wounds four months later. His grave is at the temple of Eirin-ji in Aizuwakamatsu, Fukushima.

Shiba's role in the Boxer Rebellion is often highlighted in Western accounts of the conflict. In the 1963 film 55 Days at Peking about the siege of international legations he is a supporting character, played by future director Juzo Itami.

== Literary career ==
Shiba is also the author of his memoirs "Remembering Aizu" (Boshin Junnan Kaikoroku (戊辰殉難回顧録), "Memoir of the Martyrs of the Boshin [War]" in Japanese). The book portrays his childhood years and family life, as well as an insider's view of the Meiji Restoration in Japan. This view includes a description of the difficulties faced by the Aizu daimyō Matsudaira Katamori and the rest of the domain's population, wrapping up with Shiba's return to Aizu in the 1870s. He also wrote an account of the siege of Beijing, titled Pekin Rōjō (北京篭城).

Because his hometown, Aizu, suffered immense damage at the hands of Satsuma forces and his own family members were among the victims, he recalled feeling "not a shred of sympathy" for the deaths of Satsuma's Saigo Takamori and Okubo Toshimichi, regarding the tragic ends of these two heroes as "the natural consequence."

His brother, Shiba Shirō, under the pen name Tokai Sanshi, was also famous during the mid-Meiji period, as the author of "Chance Encounters with Beautiful Women" (Kajin no Kigu), a fictionalized account of his time as a student at the University of Pennsylvania in Philadelphia.

== Decorations ==
- 1893 – Order of the Sacred Treasure, 6th class
- 1895 – Order of the Golden Kite, 4th class
- 1897 – Order of the Sacred Treasure, 5th class
- 1906 – Order of the Golden Kite, 2nd class
- 1910 – Order of the Sacred Treasure, 2nd class
- 1917 – Order of the Sacred Treasure, 1st class

=== Foreign ===
- 1902 – Order of the Iron Crown
- 1902 – Order of Saints Maurice and Lazarus
- 1907 – Royal Victorian Order, Honorary Knight Commander

== See also ==
- Claude MacDonald
