= Cao Futian =

Chinese leader of the Boxer Uprising (died 1901)

Cao Futian 曹福田
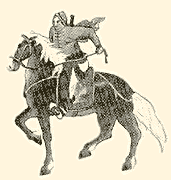
- Depiction of Cao Futian on horseback
- Born: 19th century Jinghai Town, Qing dynasty
- Died: 1901; Jinghai Town, Qing dynasty
- Military career
- Allegiance: Yìhéquán
- Memorials: Memorial Hall of the Boxer Uprising

Cao Futian was a Chinese mystic, martial artist, and militant who helped mobilize and lead the anti-Christian and xenophobic Yìhéquán (Boxers), which organized militias and pogroms of foreign missionaries, civilians and Chinese Christians in the Qing Empire around the turn of the 20th century. Along with his ally Zhang Decheng, he helped organize a popular mobilization and uprising of peasants around Tianjin as part of the Boxer rebellion, which aimed to support the Qing dynasty, to expel and/or exterminate foreigners, and ultimately isolate China from foreign powers and foreign ideas (such as Christianity). When the invasion of the Eight-Nation Alliance forced the imperial court to change from support of the Boxers to suppression, government troops captured and beheaded him in 1901.

== Biography ==
Little is known of the early life of Cao Futian but he was born in the mid-19th century, in Jinghai, Zhili province, China. Cao He was a master of Kung Fu and a charismatic leader. He had been a soldier. and he raised a militia in Tiānjīn, most of whom were illiterate, such as laid-off railway workers, religious cult followers, criminals, and unemployed youth. Cao hated foreigners because of the establishment of the foreign concessions, but even more because of the actions of missionaries who spread Christianity and undermined Chinese religions. He thought Chinese Christians should be expelled for polluting Chinese culture. First hostile to the Chinese Imperial Army, he fought them in August 1899. The Qing government was divided as to how to react to the Boxers’ activities, but conservative elements of the court were in favour of them. Prince Duan, a fervent supporter, arranged a meeting between Cao and Empress Dowager Ci Xi. At the meeting, the crown prince even wore a Boxer uniform to show allegiance.

Cao Futian was also a spiritual leader, and many believed he had divine abilities. He and Zhang Decheng, another Boxer leader, were said to be able to make himselves disappear, and to have powers of bilocation. In 1900, he set up headquarters at 18 Hejia Lane, Ruyyi'an Street of Hongqiao District, Tiānjīn, at a temple venerating Lü Dongbin. The building is now the Memorial Hall of the Boxer Uprising (Lü Zu Tang). On 14 July 1900, Tiānjīn was captured by the Allied forces of the Eight-Nation Alliance after a three-day battle. Cao Futian had to flee to Jinghai, but in May 1901 government forces captured him. He was then beheaded for conspiring to stir up conflict.
