= Eugène Darcy =

French captain and author (1868–1928)

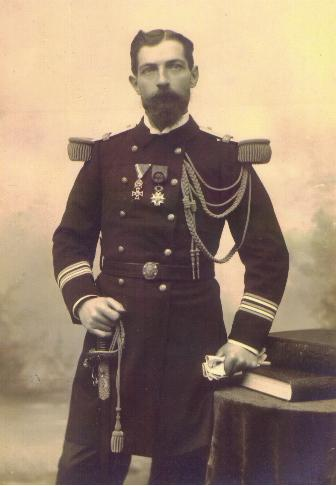
- Darcy at the Minister of Navy's office
- Born: 10 January 1868; Constantine, Department of Constantine, France
- Died: 10 December 1928 (aged 60); Toulon, Var, France
- Education: École Navale
- Military career
- Allegiance: French Third Republic
- Branch: French Army
- Service years: 1896–1915
- Rank: Capitaine de vaisseau
- Conflicts: Boxer Rebellion: Siege of the International Legations
- Other work: Author

Eugène Darcy (1868-1928) was a French captain and author during the early 20th century. He was known for his service during the Boxer Rebellion, recounting his experiences about the war in his works with one of them awarding him the Montyon Prize.

== Early Military career ==
Eugène was born on 10 January 1868 in Constantine, Algeria, the son of annuitant André Louis Damascène and Marie-Hippolyte (née Jarillot) Darcy. He enrolled at the École Navale in 1885. He graduated from the academy on 5 October 1888 and was made a midshipman. He was then promoted to ensign and assigned to the port of Brest, Finistère on 23 July 1891, and was then made assistant of the Captain of the 2nd Fleet Crew Depot within the port. On 1 January 1894 he became part of the crew within the Le Terrible under Captain Gustave Ferrat. Darcy then decided to take up further military education by attending the Battalion of Apprentice-Fusiliers of Lorient on 1 January 1896, and became a licensed fusilier by the end of the year. On 1 January 1897 he was assigned as the Lieutenant of the 1st Battalion of the Apprentice-Fusiliers. He was then promoted to Lieutenant on 20 April 1898 while at Toulon, and became a patented torpedo officer.

== Boxer Rebellion ==
He remained in Toulon during 1899 but by the next year, he was part of the staff aboard D'Entrecasteaux under Louis de Marolles. A few months later though, Darcy was appointed to lead a squad of 78 sailors from the cruiser to defend the French legation at Peking after the outbreak of the Boxer Rebellion. During the Siege of the International Legations, he witnessed the deaths of Sub-Lieutenant Henry and Midshipman Herbert and he recounted their deaths in the novel La défense de la légation de France à Pékin. Another event that occurred during the siege was that the Swiss hotelier Auguste Chamot and his wife personally asked Darcy to provide an armed escort to the Ma Jia Pu Station on June 11 along with the Italian and Japanese forces. For his service during the siege, he was awarded the Knight of the Legion of Honor on 5 October 1900, before being awarded with the Officer class two months later.

== Senior career ==
After returning from China, he was made Secretary of the maritime prefect of Lorient on 24 January 1901, and commander of the Company of guards-consignes on 1 January 1902. From 4 October 1902 to 1904 he commanded the Rapière and the Épée on 1 March 1905. Around the same time, Darcy received the Montyon Prize for his work titled Les derniers jours de Pékin. Darcy was then promoted to Capitaine de frégate on 2 August 1906, while commanding the Saint Louis under Rear-Admiral Jules Le Pord. He then commanded the Justice but was then made commander of the 1st Maritime Prefect of the General Staff of Toulon in 1909.

On 1 January 1910 he was made commander of the Central Torpedo Boat Service within the 5th Maritime Prefect of Toulon and made Chief of Staff of the 1st Maritime Prefect of Toulon on 11 October 1911. Darcy was promoted to Capitaine de vaisseau on 7 August 1913. His last given command would be that of the 2nd Special Reserve Group consisting of the "Brennus" and "Amiral-Trehouart" on 19 September 1913, before he was transferred back to Toulon on 1 January 1915, and would retire by the end of the year due to his age.
