= Vers-en-Montagne =

- Commune
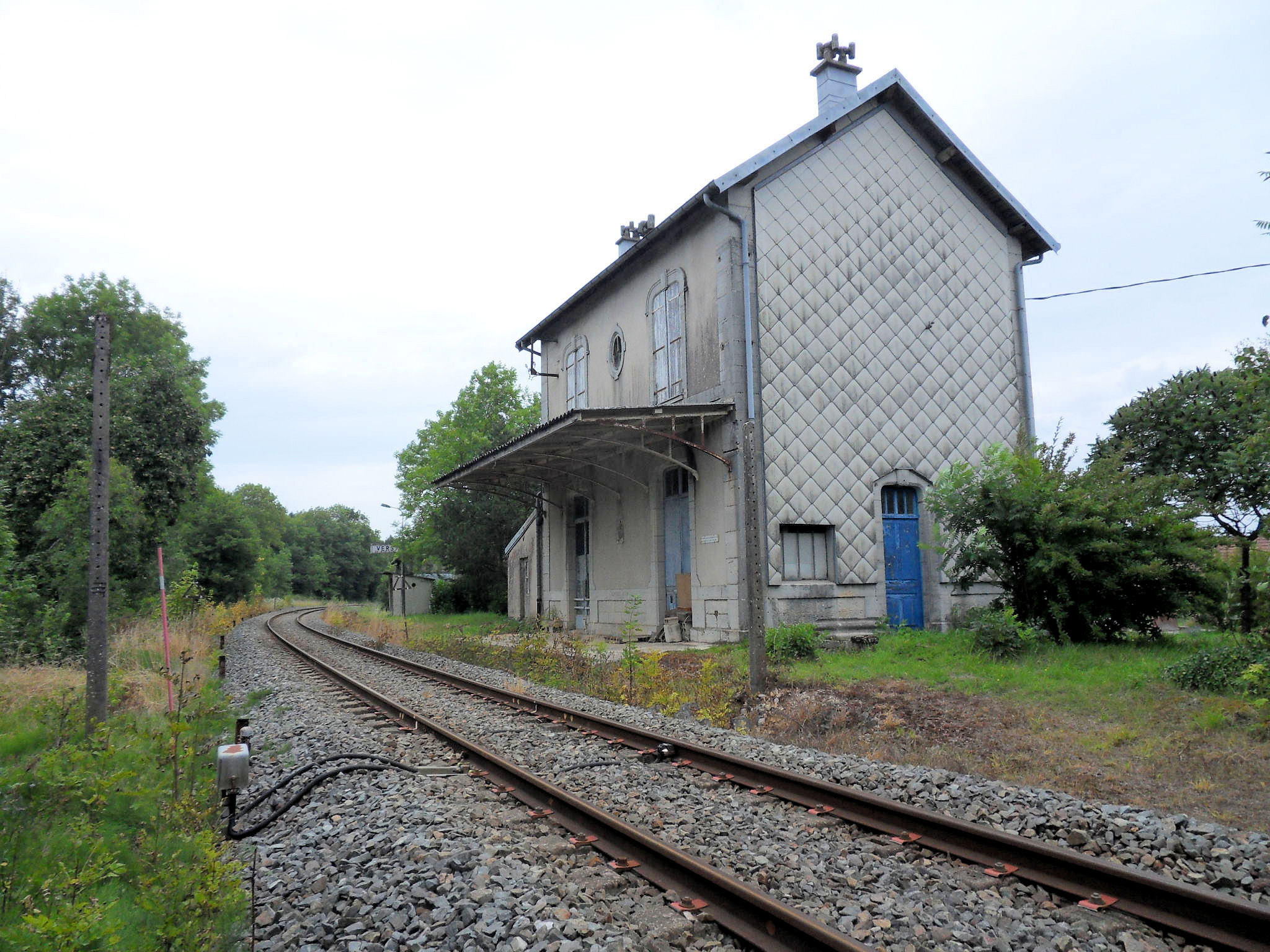
- Former train station
- Location of Vers-en-Montagne
- Location within France Location within Bourgogne-Franche-Comté
- Coordinates: 46°49′00″N 5°54′58″E
- Country: France
- Region: Bourgogne-Franche-Comté
- Department: Jura
- Arrondissement: Lons-le-Saunier
- Canton: Champagnole

Government
  - Mayor (2020–2026): Émile Bezin
- Area^{1}: 8.35 km^{2} (3.22 sq mi)
- Highest elevation: 660 m (2,170 ft)
- Lowest elevation: 586 m (1,923 ft)
- Population (2023): 235
  - Density: 28.1/km^{2} (72.9/sq mi)
- Time zone: UTC+01:00 (CET)
  - Summer (DST): UTC+02:00 (CEST)
- INSEE/Postal code: 39554 /39300
- ^{1} French Land Register data, which excludes lakes, ponds, glaciers > 1 km^{2} (0.386 sq mi or 247 acres) and river estuaries.

Vers-en-Montagne (Arpitan: Væî) is a commune in the Jura department in the Bourgogne-Franche-Comté region in eastern France.

== Population ==
Historical population
Year	Pop.	±% p.a.
1968	167	—
1975	209	+3.26%
1982	217	+0.54%
1990	227	+0.56%
1999	191	−1.90%
2007	198	+0.45%
2012	223	+2.41%
2017	234	+0.97%
2023	235	+0.07%
Source: INSEE

== See also ==
- Communes of the Jura department
