= Boxer movement =

Chinese secret society active from the 1880s to 1901

Boxers
- 義和拳
- A Boxer war flag, inspired by the Black Flag Army
- Other name: Plum Blossom Fists (1898); League of Harmony and Justice (1899); Righteous and Harmonious Fists (1899–1901)
- Commander: Cao Futian; Zhang Decheng
- Dates active: 1890s–September 1901
- Country: China
- Ideology: Chinese nationalism; Conservatism (Chinese); Monarchism; Anti-Western sentiment; Anti-Christianism; Anti-imperialism; Xenophobia
- Size: 50,000–100,000
- Wars: Boxer Rebellion

Boxer movement

National Righteousness Group
- Traditional Chinese: 義民會
- Simplified Chinese: 义民会
Transcriptions
Standard Mandarin
- Hanyu Pinyin: Yìmínhuì
- Bopomofo: ㄧˋ ㄇㄧㄣˊ ㄏㄨㄟˋ
- Wade–Giles: I^{4}-min^{2}-hui^{4}
- Tongyong Pinyin: Yì-mín-huèi
- IPA: [î.mǐn.xwêɪ]
Yue: Cantonese
- Yale Romanization: Yih-màhn-wuí
- Jyutping: Ji6 man4 wui2
- IPA: [ji˨ mɐn˩ wuj˧˥]

League of Harmony and Justice
- Traditional Chinese: 義和團
- Simplified Chinese: 义和团
Transcriptions
Standard Mandarin
- Hanyu Pinyin: Yìhétuán
- Bopomofo: ㄧˋ ㄏㄜˊ ㄊㄨㄢˊ
- Wade–Giles: I^{4}-ho^{2}-t'uan^{2}
- Tongyong Pinyin: Yì-hé-tuán
- IPA: [î.xɤ̌.tʰwǎn]
Yue: Cantonese
- Yale Romanization: Yih-wòh-tyùhn
- Jyutping: Ji6 wo4 tyun4
- IPA: [ji˨ wɔ˩ tʰyn˩]

Plum Blossom Fists
- Chinese: 梅花拳
Transcriptions
Standard Mandarin
- Hanyu Pinyin: Méihuāquán
- Bopomofo: ㄇㄟˊ ㄏㄨㄚ ㄑㄩㄢˊ
- Wade–Giles: Mei^{2}-hua^{1}-ch'üan^{2}
- Tongyong Pinyin: Méi-hua-cyuán
- IPA: [měɪ.xwá.tɕʰɥɛ̌n]
Yue: Cantonese
- Yale Romanization: Muìh-fā-kyùhn
- Jyutping: Mui4 faa1 kyun4
- IPA: [muj˩ fa˥ kʰyn˩]

Fists of Harmony and Justice
- Traditional Chinese: 義和拳
- Simplified Chinese: 义和拳
Transcriptions
Standard Mandarin
- Hanyu Pinyin: Yìhéquán
- Bopomofo: ㄧˋ ㄏㄜˊ ㄑㄩㄢˊ
- Wade–Giles: I^{4}-ho^{2}-ch'üan^{2}
- Tongyong Pinyin: Yì-hé-cyuán
- IPA: [î.xɤ̌.tɕʰɥɛ̌n]
Yue: Cantonese
- Yale Romanization: Yih-wòh-kyùhn
- Jyutping: Ji6 wo4 kyun4
- IPA: [ji˨ wɔ˩ kʰyn˩]

The Boxers, officially known as the Society of Righteous and Harmonious Fists (among other names), were a Chinese secret society and resistance movement based in Northern China that carried out the Boxer Rebellion, or Boxer Uprising from 1899 to 1901.

The movement was made up of independent local village groups, many of which kept their membership secret, making the total number of participants difficult to estimate, but it may have included as many as 100,000. They originally attacked the Qing government, but soon called upon it to resist foreign influence.

In the summer of 1900, groups of Boxer fighters destroyed foreign owned property, such as railroads and telegraphs, and murdered Christian missionaries and Chinese Christians. They then supported the Empress Dowager in resisting the resulting foreign invasion, which all but destroyed the group and ended the Rebellion, though some members continued in other groups across China.

== Names ==
In the English-speaking world, the group came to be known as the "Boxers", due to its members' practice of Chinese martial arts, at the time called "Chinese boxing". The term was popularized through English-language media of the time. Though the group had existed since the mid-1880s, it was first reported externally as the "National Righteousness Group" (義民會; 义民会; Yìmínhuì; I^{4}-min^{2}-hui^{4}) in an 1899 Qing report intent on solving disturbances in the Shandong and Zhili Provinces. This is later clarified in a follow-up report to have been a mistake, and that the actual name is in fact "League of Harmony and Justice" (義和團; 义和团; Yìhétuán; I^{4}-ho^{2}-t'uan^{2}), alternatively translated as "Militia United in Righteousness".

During 1898, the group was known as the Plum Blossom Fists (梅花拳; Méihuāquán; Mei^{2}-hua^{1}-ch'üan^{2}), though this name would not be used into 1899 and after.

In more recent English publications, the name of the group from 1899, variously translated as "Society of Righteous and Harmonious Fists" or "Fists of Harmony and Justice" (義和拳; 义和拳; Yìhéquán; I^{4}-ho^{2}-ch'üan^{2}), tends to be used over the yìhétuán-based name. The group is also sometimes known in English by any one of its Chinese names, with more recent publications tending to use Pinyin, and older publications using Wade–Giles or other systems.

== Origins ==
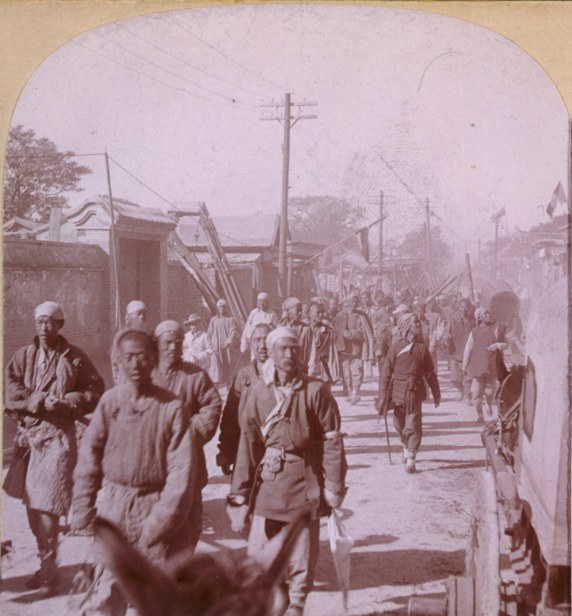
Boxer fighters capturing during the Battle of Tientsin, 1901

During the rule of the Qing dynasty, non-state secret societies, such as the Big Swords Society or the White Lotus Society, often exerted significant influence and force. These groups often took advantage, through armed members, of the lack of imperial order in many areas of China, along with rampant corruption that enabled the societies to function even in well-controlled areas.

Yi-he boxing, as it was later practised by the Fists of Harmony and Justice, long predated the movement. In 1779, the Qing government already investigated rumours according to which a man named Yang practised this martial arts style in Guan County, Shandong, though state authorities were unable to confirm this at the time.

Though the Boxer movement originated in Shandong and Hebei intent on lessening governmental influence throughout China by means of violence and its goals quickly expanded to attempt to eliminate all foreign influence, which was considered at the time to have already penetrated the imperial government. The group at this time was deeply associated with other secret societies in their efforts to eliminate Christians, as can be seen in the 4 July 1896 with attacks on German missionaries in the regions of Western Shandong that later were controlled by the Boxers.

During 1898, the previously separate Boxer groups in Shandong and Hebei would fall under much more direct leadership, with the establishment of structure into the group in the form of ranks. This would also involve the renaming of the group into the "Plum Blossom Fists". However, the name-change was not used past 1898, with the name "Fists of Harmony and Justice" used instead.

On 23 May 1898, an investigation was made by the Guangxu Emperor into disturbances in the Shandong-Zhili border region by a supposed "National Righteousness Group", with the possibility of 10,000 Boxer soldiers being under group command in this region. A representative of the monarchy, Zhang Rumei, would be sent along with an army to put down any unrest in the region. The result of the meeting was not negative, with Zhang reporting that there was no trouble in the region, along with more accurate reports on the group's smaller numbers.

A series of natural disasters, famine, and growing anti-foreign sentiment resulted in an environment in which the itinerant martial arts masters at the center of the movement found receptive audiences. The Yellow River had flooded in 1898 and drought followed over the course of 1898–1900. This made entire communities in Shandong destitute. Simultaneously, foreign missionaries backed by foreign diplomatic and military power were increasingly active, with religious conversions exacerbating existing divisions in rural society and creating new ones, particularly as Chinese Christians leveraged their connections to foreign missionaries to obtain advantages in litigation and other disputes. Some Chinese linked the two phenomena, contending that the drought was influenced by Chinese Christians' refusal to worship local deities and Christian church placement and design violating principles of geomancy (feng shui). The movement was primarily composed of peasants, to which were added idle youth, ruined artisans, and laid-off workers. Some Boxer recruits were disbanded imperial soldiers and local militiamen.

== Conflict ==
The Boxers used the slogan, "Uphold the Qing, destroy foreigners!" The Boxers fought with traditional swords, spears, as well as techniques that they viewed as magical arts, and sometimes guns and cannons provided to them by local officials who were sympathetic to their goals. Many martial arts masters in the movement taught charms and rituals which they contended would give their followers immunity to swords, spears, and bullets. Among their leaders were Cao Futian, and in Zhili Province, Liu Chengxiang, and Zhang Decheng.

Government responses to the rising movement were mixed, with some officials contending that the government should suppress the movement, and others contending that it should be used against the foreign powers. Some officials worried that grassroots armed movements could imperil the Qing dynasty itself. Governor Yuxian of Shandong supported the movement, contributing to its spread in the province.

In 1899 and 1900, the movement spread to drought-stricken areas of Zhili, Henan, and Shanxi. In December 1899, the Qing court responded to foreign pressure by removing Yuxian as governor and replacing him with Yuan Shikai, who sought to suppress the movement in Shandong. Yuxian, now governor of Shanxi following his removal in Shandong, continued to support the movement. Members of the movement attacked and killed Chinese Christians. European and American diplomats demanded that the Qing court act in response.

From January to March 1900, the Qing court issued a series of decrees on the movement which were ambiguous on the whole, both praising the movement and banning it.

The movement continued to spread and broaden its activities. In addition to targeting Chinese Christians, it attacked foreigners and things the movement viewed as physical parts of foreign presence in China, such as telegraph lines, railway, and churches. The foreign powers increased their demands for the Qing court to eliminate the movement, and the Qing court responded by dispatching three battalions commanded by General Nie Shicheng to do so.

In April 1900, foreign warships entered took up stations in Bohai Bay as a show of force.

In mid-May 1900, the Laishui Incident occurred. After an attack by the movement on Chinese Christians in Laishui county, a force of 60 men commanded by Colonel Yang Futong clashed with the Boxers several times. On 22 May, movement forces ambushed the government forces and killed Yang. The Laishui Incident inspired increased Boxer attacks (including on railways and the occupation of Zhuozhou). It prompted the Qing court to deploy Nie Shicheng's troops to protect the Beijing-Tianjin railway from the Boxers. It also strengthened the argument by some in the Qing court who thought the movement could harnessed against the foreign powers.

At the beginning of June 1900, about 450 men of the Eight-Nation Alliance arrived in Beijing to protect the foreign legations under siege by the Boxers and Imperial Army, in what became the Siege of the International Legations. Empress Dowager Cixi believed that the increased presence of foreign troops was intended to eliminate her and restore the power of the Guangxu emperor. In turn, her concern strengthened the position of those in the Qing court who believed the Boxers should be used against the foreign powers.

On 6 June 1900, Boxers destroyed Luofa Rail Station, which cut the Beijing-Tianjin line. The Qing court decided to support the Boxers. During the first half of June, Boxers attacked churches, foreigner's homes, and burned the British summer legation. In turn, foreign legation guards shot indiscriminately at Chinese with no effort to distinguish Boxers from uninvolved city residents.

On 10 June 1900, the Seymour Expedition, combined from the naval forces of the various foreign countries with a warship presence in Bohai Bay, left Tianjin to assist in the defense of the legation quarter in Beijing. The Seymour Expedition fought Boxers and combined forces of government troops and Boxers, and was ultimately forced to turn back to Tianjin where it arrived on 26 June.

During the Seymour Expedition, the captains of the foreign warships in Bohai Bay decided to capture the Dagu Forts in order to ensure their maritime access to Tianjin. The Battle of the Dagu Forts began on 17 June, and the next day the Chinese defenses were defeated.

Also on 17 June, troops commanded by Nie Shicheng began a siege of the foreign concession in Tianjin. Foreign troops lifted the siege on 22 June and placed the walled Chinese walled city of Tianjin under siege. Foreign forces captures the Chinese walled city on 14 July and then engaged in looting and raped for several days afterwards.

In Beijing, Chinese government forces placed the legation quarter under siege on 20 June, a day after the order for all foreigners to leave the Beijing expired. On 21 June, China declared war on the foreign powers. Only some of the Qing armies participated, with Yuan Shikai keeping his forces out of the war and viceroys and provincial governors in Yangzi Valley area and in the south (who had opposed the Boxers since inception) not participating.

On 4 August, the army of the Eight-Nation Alliance departed Tianjin for Beijing. On 14–15 August, Cixi and the Qing court fled to Xi'an. Eight-Nation Alliance forces captured Beijing and dispersed across Zhili and Shanxi both to suppress the Boxer movement and engage in a punishment campaign of Chinese, regardless of whether their targets had been involved in the movement or not. The punitive campaign covered the period of mid-August 1900 through April 1901, while negotiations proceeded.

On 7 September 1901, the Boxer Protocol was signed. It required punishment of Qing officials who had worked with the Boxers, an indemnity paid by China, destruction of the Dagu Forts, and a two-year ban on China importing arms.

== In popular culture ==
The Boxer Rebellion is depicted in the film 55 Days at Peking, by Nicholas Ray (1963). The Boxer Rebellion is graphically depicted in the Shaw Brothers production of Boxer Rebellion, a 1976 film directed by Chang Cheh. This film was distributed in the United States as The Bloody Avengers by World Northal Corporation in 1980. The Boxers are also featured in the films Legendary Weapons of China (1981) and Shanghai Knights (2003). The Red Lanterns, an all-female group affiliated to the Boxers, are depicted in the film Once Upon a Time in China IV (1993). The Netflix series The Brothers Sun (2024) uses their name and parts of their ideology in its plot for a major protagonist group.

The Boxers are portrayed in Boxers and Saints, a comic series by Gene Luen Yang. The main character of Boxers, Lee Bao, becomes a leader of the Boxer Rebellion.

== See also ==
- Katipunan
- Red Turban Rebellion
- Taiping Heavenly Kingdom
- Red Lanterns (Boxer Uprising)
