= 55 Days at Peking =

1963 historical war film directed by Nicholas Ray

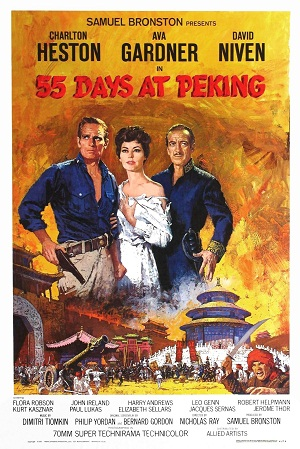
- Theatrical release poster by Howard Terpning
- Directed by: Nicholas Ray
- Written by: Philip Yordan; Bernard Gordon
- Produced by: Samuel Bronston
- Starring: Charlton Heston; Ava Gardner; David Niven; Flora Robson; John Ireland; Leo Genn; Robert Helpmann; Kurt Kasznar; Philippe Leroy; Paul Lukas; Elizabeth Sellars; Massimo Serato; Jacques Sernas; Jerome Thor
- Cinematography: Jack Hildyard
- Edited by: Robert Lawrence
- Music by: Dimitri Tiomkin
- Production company: Samuel Bronston Productions
- Distributed by: Allied Artists
- Release date: May 29, 1963
- Running time: 153 minutes
- Country: United States
- Language: English
- Budget: $10 million
- Box office: $10 million (US) $270,560 (overseas)

55 Days at Peking is a 1963 American epic historical war film dramatizing the siege of the foreign legations' compounds in Beijing (then known in English as Peking) during the Boxer Rebellion, which took place in China in the summer of 1900. It was produced by Samuel Bronston for Allied Artists, with a screenplay by Philip Yordan and Bernard Gordon, and with uncredited contributions from Robert Hamer, Julian Halevy, and Ben Barzman. Noel Gerson wrote a screenplay novelization in 1963 under the pseudonym "Samuel Edwards".

The film was directed primarily by Nicholas Ray, although Guy Green and Andrew Marton assumed leadership in the latter stages of filming after Ray had fallen ill. Both men were uncredited. It stars Charlton Heston, Ava Gardner, and David Niven, with supporting roles by Flora Robson, John Ireland, Leo Genn, Robert Helpmann, Harry Andrews, and Kurt Kasznar. It also contains the first known screen appearance of future martial arts film star Yuen Siu Tien. Japanese film director Juzo Itami, credited in the film as "Ichizo Itami", appears as Col. Goro Shiba.

55 Days at Peking was released by Allied Artists on May 29, 1963. The film received mixed reviews, mainly for its historical inaccuracies and lack of character development. However, it was praised for its acting, direction, music, action sequences, and production design. In addition to its mixed critical reviews, the film grossed only $10 million at the box office against a budget of $10 million. Despite this, the film was nominated for two Academy Awards. It was director Ray's last film until Lightning Over Water (1980).

== Plot ==
=== Historical background ===
Famine in Northern China is affecting millions of peasants by the summer of 1900. Starvation will be one of the major causes of the ensuing Boxer Rebellion. The legations of various industrialized countries are trapped in Beijing surrounded by Boxers who oppose their influence in China and the spread of Western Christianity.

The turmoil in China worsens when the Empress Dowager Cixi gives her approval to the Boxers to start oppressing foreigners throughout China, especially as 13 of China's 18 provinces have been forced into territorial concessions to overseas colonial powers. The situation escalates rapidly after an ambassador is murdered in the street. The Boxers begin a violent siege of Beijing's foreign legations quarter. Supported by Imperial troops, the Boxer secret societies begin killing Christians as anti-Western sentiment boils over.

=== Film plot ===
Major Matt Lewis (based on Major John Twiggs Myers), arrives in China with a new detachment of US Marines. He is an experienced China hand who knows local conditions well. A love interest blossoms between him and Baroness Natasha Ivanova, a Russian aristocrat who, it is revealed, had an affair with a Chinese General, causing her Russian husband, the youngest Colonel in the Russian Army, to commit suicide. The Russian Imperial Minister, who is Natasha's brother-in-law, has revoked her visa in an attempt to recover a valuable necklace. Although the Baroness tries leaving Peking as the siege begins, she is forced by events to return to Major Lewis and volunteers in the hospital, which is battered by the siege and is running out of supplies. To help the defenders, the Baroness exchanges her very valuable jeweled necklace for medical supplies and food, but she is wounded in the process and later dies.

Lewis leads the small contingent of 400 multinational soldiers and US Marines defending the compound. As the siege worsens, Maj. Lewis forms an alliance with the senior officer at the British Legation, Sir Arthur Robertson, pending the arrival of a British-led relief force. After hearing that the force has been repulsed by Chinese forces, Maj. Lewis and Sir Arthur succeed in their mission to blow up a sizable Chinese arsenal.

As the foreign defenders conserve food and water, while trying to save hungry children, the Empress continues plotting with the Boxers by supplying aid from her Chinese troops. Eventually, a foreign relief force from the Eight-Nation Alliance arrives and defeats the Boxers. The relief expedition's troops reach Beijing on the 55th day and, following the Battle of Peking (Beijing), lift the siege of the foreign legations. Foreshadowing the demise of the Qing dynasty, rulers of China for the previous two and a half centuries, the Dowager Empress Cixi, alone in her throne room, having gambled her empire and lost, declares repeatedly to herself, "The dynasty is finished".

When the soldiers of the Eight-Nation Alliance have taken control of the city, after routing the Boxers and the remnants of the Imperial Army, Maj. Lewis assembles his men, having received new orders from his superiors to leave Peking. He stops and circles back to retrieve Teresa, the young, half-Chinese daughter of one of his Marine comrades, his former Executive Officer, who was killed during the 55-day siege. Aboard his horse, she and Maj. Lewis leave the city behind, followed by his column of marching Marines.

== Cast ==
- Charlton Heston as Maj. Matt Lewis (based upon John Twiggs Myers)
- Ava Gardner as Baroness Natalie Ivanoff (Natalia Ivanova; sister-in-law of Sergei and Sophie Ivanoff/Ivanova)
- David Niven as Sir Arthur Robertson (based upon Sir Claude MacDonald)
- Flora Robson as Empress Dowager Cixi
- John Ireland as Sgt. Harry
- Leo Genn as Gen. Jung-Lu
- Harry Andrews as Father de Bearn
- Robert Helpmann as Prince Tuan
- Juzo Itami as Col. Goro Shiba
- Mervyn Johns as Clergyman
- Kurt Kasznar as Baron Sergei Ivanoff (based upon Mikhail Nikolayevich von Giers)
- Philippe Leroy as Julliard
- Paul Lukas as Dr. Steinfeldt
- Lynne Sue Moon as Teresa
- Elizabeth Sellars as Lady Sarah Robertson
- Massimo Serato as Menotti Garibaldi
- Jacques Sernas as Maj. Bobrinski
- Jerome Thor as Capt. Andy Marshall
- Geoffrey Bayldon as Smythe
- Joseph Furst as Capt. Hanselman
- Walter Gotell as Capt. Hoffman
- Alfredo Mayo as Spanish Minister (dubbed by Robert Rietti, based upon Bernardo de Cólogan)
- Martin Miller as Hugo Bergmann
- José Nieto as Italian Minister (based upon Giuseppe Salvago Raggi)
- Eric Pohlmann as Baron von Meck (based upon Clemens von Ketteler)
- Aram Stephan as Gaumaire The French minister (based upon Stephen Pichon)
- Robert Urquhart as Capt. Hanley
- Burt Kwouk as Old Man (voice)

=== Uncredited roles ===
- Fernando Sancho as Belgian Minister (based upon Maurice Joostens)
- Nicholas Ray as U.S. Minister Maxwell (based upon Edwin H. Conger)
- Félix Dafauce as Dutch Minister (based upon Fridolin Marinus Knobel)
- Carlos Casaravilla as Japanese Minister (based upon Nishi Tokujirō)
- R.S.M. Ronald Brittain as Sgt. Britten
- Alfred Lynch as Gerald
- Michael Chow as Chiang
- George Wang as Kaige, Boxer Chief
- Lucille Soong as Concubine
- Yuen Siu Tien as Court Boxer
- John Moulder-Brown as Tommy
- Milton Reid as Boxer
- Andrea Esterhazy as Austrian minister (based upon Moritz Freiherr Czikann von Wahlborn)

== Production ==
=== Development ===
On September 8, 1959, producer Jerry Wald announced he would be producing a film on the Boxer Rebellion tentatively titled The Hell Raisers for 20th Century Fox. He had hoped to star David Niven as a British officer and Stephen Boyd as a United States Marine commander while Hope Lange and France Nuyen were sought for supporting female roles. A few weeks later, on September 24, it was reported that Wald had signed Niven, Boyd, and Nuyen for their respective roles.

Meanwhile, producer Samuel Bronston had enjoyed commercial success from making historical spectacles in Spain, particularly King of Kings (1961), directed by Nicholas Ray, and El Cid (1961), directed by Anthony Mann starring Charlton Heston. In Paris, screenwriters Philip Yordan and Bernard Gordon were brainstorming ideas for potential historical epics. During one story conference, Gordon suggested the Boxer Rebellion, having recalled reading a theatrical play while working in the Story Department for Paramount Pictures during the 1940s. Yordan dismissed the idea, but after he had returned from a cruise in London, his wife located a book with a chapter titled "Fifty-five Days at Peking" inside a bookstore and showed it to him. Fascinated with the title alone, Yordan pitched the idea to Gordon, who noted that he had earlier pitched the Boxer Rebellion. In an interview with the Los Angeles Times, Bronston stated he was attracted to the Boxer Rebellion because it showed "the unity of peoples, no matter what their beliefs, in the face of danger. This incident is what the UN symbolizes but has not yet achieved."

In September 1961, Bronston announced he was planning a trilogy of historical epics in Spain, among them was 55 Days at Peking and The Fall of the Roman Empire (1964). For 55 Days at Peking, Alec Guinness was being sought for a lead role while a British director was to be selected. Filming was slated to begin in spring 1962.

That same month, Wald told The New York Times that he was unhappy with Bronston's plans as his project had long been in development, with a final script draft being written by Barre Lyndon; Wald had also wanted Guinness to star in his project. Furthermore, he stated that he had filed an infringement complaint with the Motion Picture Association of America because he had approached Yordan to write a script in 1956. In April 1962, Wald instead sold the project to NBC as a television film, but his death three months later prevented its continuation.

=== Writing ===
In 1977, Ray recalled, "The pressure was tremendous. On a $6 million production, I had no production manager, and a 21-year-old assistant director. No script. I had two artists in my office, one Chinese and one Spanish. I'd describe the scene to them, they'd draw it and then I'd give it to the so-called writers and say, "Write a scene around this?"

Prior to filming, Gordon and Ray had worked on a draft in which the former struggled writing as he contracted "colds and the flu and constantly ran a low-grade fever." After four weeks of work, they presented pages of their draft to Yordan, who ordered them to "go back to square one and write the kind of clumsy, impersonal, fat historical opus" that the international distributors wanted." With filming nearly approaching, Yordan suggested hiring Arnaud d'Usseau to assist Gordon with writing some scenes, particularly those with Gardner. Gordon later recalled that d'Usseau worked meticulously slowly and "simply couldn't find his way into our script." After a few weeks, d'Usseau left the project with none of his work being used. Shortly after this, blacklisted screenwriter Julian Halevy accepted Gordon's offer to rewrite some scenes, among of which were new scenes for the Empress Dowager.

By May 1962, Gordon delivered a 140-page shooting script, but most of the scenes were merely summarized or sketched in. That same month, Heston received the script, but disapprovingly jotted in his journal that "[t]he love story is very arbitrary, I think; the dialogue primitive." Filming would proceed without a finished script and on-set rewrites were frequent. It had been suggested that a native British screenwriter should revise the dialogue for Niven's character for which Robert Hamer had been hired for the task. Ultimately, his services were later turned away as Hamer had sunken into alcoholism. Yordan then recruited Jon Manchip White to help rework the script, but it did not pan out.

Four weeks later into production, Niven threatened to walk off set unless the script was rewritten. Yordan ordered Gordon to write "a Hamlet scene for him, and he'll shut up." Gordon then wrote four to five pages of monologue for Niven's character to self-reflect on his actions. The new scenes were sent to Niven, prompting him to return and finish filming.

=== Casting ===
In September 1961, Heston was initially slated to star in The Fall of the Roman Empire, but he expressed reluctance after reading the screenplay. In November 1961, Heston was presented with a treatment for 55 Days at Peking, and by this stage, Ray was chosen to direct the film. "It might be an interesting period for a film," wrote Heston. "I'd like to work for Nick, too." However, Heston was still reluctant. In December 1961, following the Madrid premiere of El Cid, during a flight back to Los Angeles, Yordan and Ray again pitched the idea to Heston, and this time he agreed to star in the film. Heston wrote in his journal, "I feel uneasy, but I'm now convinced I must go basically on what confidence I have in a director's talent." Subsequently, The Fall of the Roman Empire was placed on hold as its already completed sets were later demolished and replaced with the Forbidden City sets for 55 Days at Peking.

In March 1962, Bronston told columnist Hedda Hopper that he had hoped Katharine Hepburn would portray Empress Dowager Tzu Hsi. Also, Bronston wanted Ava Gardner for the female lead, although Heston did not want to work with Gardner and instead pushed for Jeanne Moreau. Meanwhile, the role had been offered to Melina Mercouri who refused it because she wanted more rewrites of the screenplay. On June 11, it was reported that Gardner and Hepburn had joined the cast.

In the lobby of the Grand Hotel in Rome, Bronston offered David Niven a role in the film for a salary of $300,000, which he accepted without reading the script. On June 12, Niven's casting was announced. By late June 1962, Hepburn had dropped out of the cast, and Bronston announced that Flora Robson had replaced her to portray the Chinese empress, while Robert Helpmann would play Prince Tuan.

=== Filming ===
Principal photography began on July 2, 1962. The film was shot on location in Las Matas just north of Las Rozas de Madrid. Three thousand extras were required, including 1,500 Chinese. There were estimated to be 300 adult Chinese people in Spain so the rest were imported from all over Europe, particularly London, Rome, Marseilles, and Lisbon.

As production continued, Gardner became difficult during the shoot, often turning up late, disliking the script, and drinking heavily. One day, she walked off set claiming an extra had taken a photograph of her. Ultimately, the idea to write Gardner out of the film came from screenwriter Ben Barzman, who had rewritten El Cid. According to Heston, Yordan had written a death scene in which the Baroness dies of shrapnel wounds. By the time the scene was shot, Gardner struggled to remember her lines. Heston then suggested giving her lines to Paul Lukas, who was playing a physician.

On September 11, 1962, Ray was hospitalized after suffering a heart attack. At this point, production had fallen six weeks behind schedule with Gardner's role being nearly complete, but significant scenes for Heston and Niven had yet to be shot. To replace him, Heston suggested Guy Green, who had previously directed him in Diamond Head (1963), to finish the remaining scenes between him and Gardner. Green subsequently left the production, and by October 1962, directorial duties were transferred to Andrew Marton, who was directing the second unit.

Marton reflected, "When I came onboard, I thought the picture was very shallow, just action, action, action and there was no meaning. I wrote a new beginning and a new ending and submitted them to management—who consisted of Bronston and Michael Wasynski ... Anyway, they said 'NO!' with a capital N, capital O. And I was very unhappy." Regardless, Marton invited director John Ford onto the set, who had advised him to shoot the sequences with no hesitation. Heston finished his scenes on October 20, 1962, for which he wrote in his journal, "What I have learned from this, I hope permanently, is never start a film without a good finished script." Principal photography ended on November 15, 1962.

== Release ==
Allied Artists, who had earlier distributed El Cid, distributed 55 Days in Peking in the United States and Canada. In October 1963, Variety reported Allied Artists had invested $2.9 million in the advertising and distributing costs. On May 28, 1963, the film received a gala invitational premiere at the Beverly Theater in Los Angeles.

Bronston funded the film's production by pre-selling the film to international distributors based on the project's title, and the involvement of Heston and Ray. In February 1962, Earl St. John announced that the Rank Organization would be putting up half the budget, which was then £2.5 million. Overseas, the Rank Organization distributed the film in the United Kingdom, Germany, Italy, Scandinavia, and the Far East. Columbia Pictures distributed the film in Australia.

=== Home media ===
Universal Studios Home Entertainment released the film on DVD February 28, 2001. A UK Blu-ray from Anchor Bay Entertainment was released in April 2014.

== Reception ==
=== Critical response ===
Bosley Crowther of The New York Times described the film as:

[R]ousing, sometimes exciting, action fare that should keep the customers alert and entertained even if their intellects are confused. The fact of the matter is that the principals and the multitudinous extras involved have no more depth than Occidental and Oriental figures on a Chinese tapestry. And their actions—at least the reasons behind the actions of the principals — are rarely explored fully. Without authentic historic background, a viewer gets a foggy picture, if any, of the real causes of the Boxer Rebellion.

Gene Arneel of Variety praised the production design and Jack Hildeyard's cinematography, but also felt the script "plays interestingly but somehow lacks appropriate power. The characterizations don't have the intensity of the struggle." Philip K. Scheuer for the Los Angeles Times wrote that "For sheer color magnificence—photographed by Jack Hildeyard in Super Technirama 70—it is as breathtaking as El Cid. Only this time, instead of medieval Spain, it is the China of 1900, complete with Forbidden City and surrounding legations. It should hold and fascinate spectators for its two-and-a-half hours of sheer, pell-mell movie making, even though characters are stereotypes whose melodramatics are as dated as the period itself."

Time magazine felt "Pictorially, the film is magnificent, and some of the handsomest scenes—an orange sun rising over the peaks of the Forbidden City, midnight pyrotechnics as the Imperial arsenal blows up, the gates of the great Tartar Wall being stormed by Boxers in scarlet turbans—are almost as good as the evocative paintings by Water-colorist Dong Kingman, which open and close the picture. It was doubtless ghastly to wait 55 days at Peking until international reinforcements arrived, and the moviegoer who experiences the whole siege in two hours and 30 minutes comes out feeling lucky." Awarding the film four complete stars, Dorothy Masters of the New York Daily News wrote: "A powerful drama of global interest, the film has integrity, a component frequently lost in the razzle-dazzle dangled by so many multi-million-dollar colossals."

At the review aggregator website Rotten Tomatoes, the film holds an approval rating of 57% based on seven reviews, with an average rating of 6.4/10.

=== Box office ===
55 Days at Peking premiered at the Beverly Theater, earning $22,000 within a week. It later opened nationwide in 21 theaters throughout 15 key cities, in which it earned $400,000 during its first two weeks. During the first weekend of June 1963, 55 Days at Peking became the number-one box office film in the United States.

By August 1963, 55 Days at Peking had reportedly earned $3.25 million generated from 400 theaters throughout the United States. Milton Goldstein, the foreign sales manager for Bronston Productions, told Variety the film was doing "solid [business]" in several international countries, a few of which even outpaced El Cid. By January 1964, the film's domestic gross was $10 million, which generated an estimated $5 million in theatrical rentals.

By November 1963, the film was reportedly doing "brisk business" in roadshow engagements in Canada and had opened to "record [business]" in Tokyo and Osaka, Japan. Later that same month, it was reported the film had earned $239,560 from seven theaters combined in Tokyo and Osaka during its first 17 days of release.

In the Belgian city of Ostend, at the Capitole theater, the film earned 1,544,960 francs ($31,000) within six weeks. It set an all-time opening record for any theater in the city.

=== Academy Award nominations ===
Music from this film was responsible for two nominations at the 1964 Academy Awards. Dimitri Tiomkin and Paul Francis Webster were nominated for Best Original Song for "So Little Time", and Tiomkin was nominated for Best Music Score – Substantially Original.

== Legacy ==
55 Days at Peking contains the first known occurrence of the phrase "Let China sleep. For when she wakes, the world will tremble", which is often mistakenly attributed to Napoleon Bonaparte. While appearing in the film in a script by Bernard Gordon, the phrase did not appear in the subsequent books versions by Noel Gerson (written under the pseudonym Samuel Edwards).

55 Days at Peking appears to be the last movie watched by President John F. Kennedy in the White House Family Theater on November 10, 1963. President Kennedy's screening of the film accompanied by his wife Jacqueline Kennedy was noted in handwritten records kept by White House Projectionist Paul Fischer.

== Comic book adaptation ==
- Gold Key: 55 Days at Peking (September 1963)
- René Bratonne also made a French newspaper comic adaptation of this film, assisted by Pierre Leguen and Claude Pascal; they who worked under the pseudonym "Jack de Brown".

== See also ==
- List of American films of 1963
- List of historical drama films of Asia
- Examples of yellowface

== Bibliography ==
- Eisenschitz, Bernard (1993). Nicholas Ray: An American Journey. Faber and Faber. ISBN 978-0-571-17830-8.
- Gordon, Bernard (1999). Hollywood Exile: or How I Learned to Love the Blacklist. University of Texas Press. ISBN 978-0-292-72827-1.
- Heston, Charlton (1979). The Actor's Life: Journals, 1956–1976. Pocket Books. ISBN 978-0-671-83016-8.
- Heston, Charlton (1995). In the Arena. Simon & Schuster. ISBN 0-684-80394-1.
- Martin, Mel (2007). The Magnificent Showman: The Epic Films of Samuel Bronston. BearManor Media. ISBN 978-1-593931-29-2.
- Server, Lee (2006). Ava Gardner: Love is Nothing. St. Martin's Press. ISBN 978-0-312-31209-1.
