= Belgian concession of Tianjin =

Former Belgian concession in Tianjin

Belgian concession of Tianjin Belgische concessie in Tianjin (Dutch) Concession belge de Tianjin (French)
- 1902–1931
- Flag Seal

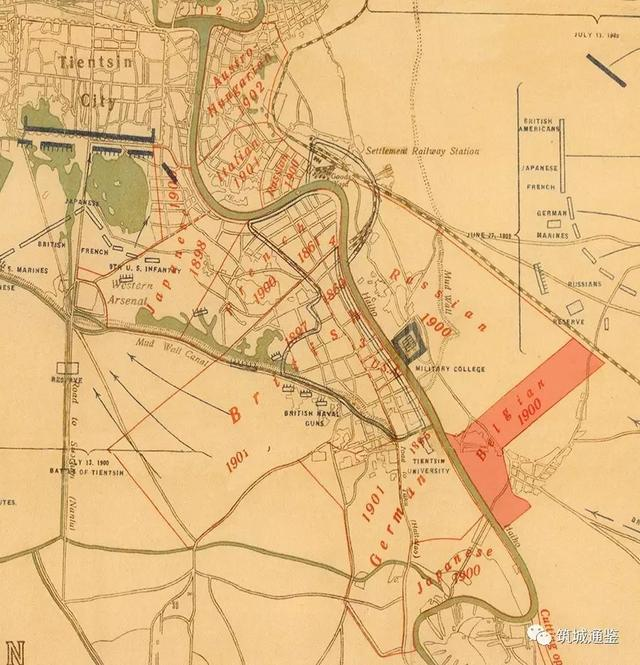
- Location of the Belgian concession
- Status: Concession of Belgium
- History
  - Established: 1902
  - Disestablished: 1931

Area
  - Total: 0.48562 km^{2} (0.18750 sq mi)
Preceded by	Succeeded by
Qing dynasty	Republic of China
- Today part of: People's Republic of China

The Belgian concession of Tianjin (Dutch: Belgische concessie in Tianjin; French: Concession belge de Tianjin; Chinese: 天津比利时租界; pinyin: Tiānjīn bǐlìshí zūjiè) was a 120-acre Belgian colonial concession in the Chinese city of Tianjin between 1902 and 1931, the only Belgian concession in China. Although its own concession had not been developed, Belgium had been very active in the infrastructure construction of Tianjin Huajie and other concessions, and can be called the "engineering captain" in the concessions of various other countries including the old city of Tianjin.

== History ==
Despite not sending in troops to fight during the Boxer Rebellion, Belgium was able to claim the parcel of land east of the Hai River in negotiations under consul Maurice Joostens, even though Russia had claimed the land previously. After claiming that Belgium would build factories in the area, Russia relented. On February 6, 1902, Zhang Lianfen of the Qing government signed the Tianjin Belgian Concession Contract with Henri Ketels, acting consul of Belgium in Tianjin. Soon after the concessions were demarcated, wooden stakes were nailed next to the Russian concession to delimit the Belgian concession.

With an impending financial crisis looming over the concession, the Belgian consul to China announced it would give back the concession to China as a gesture of friendship. On August 31, 1929, China and Belgium signed a charter for the return of the Tianjin-Belgium Concession, stipulating that the administrative power of the concession and all the public properties of the concession should be transferred to the Chinese government; on the other hand, the 93,000 taels in debt (with interest) shall be repaid by the Chinese government.

== See also ==
- Foreign concessions in Tianjin
- Foreign concessions in China
- Map of concessions in Tianjin (in Chinese)
- Belgian colonial empire
- List of former foreign enclaves in China
