= Lynne Sue Moon =

British actress (born 1949)

- Born: 1949 (age 76–77); Islington, London, England
- Other name: Lee Sue Moon
- Education: Italia Conti Academy of Theatre Arts
- Occupation: Film actress
- Years active: 1963–1967
- Notable work: 55 Days at Peking

Lynne Sue Moon (born 1949) is a British former child actress of the 1960s, best known for her appearance in the historical drama 55 Days at Peking.

== Biography ==
Moon was born in Islington, London, the daughter of a Cantonese father and a British mother. She studied ballet for two years at London's Arts Educational School. According to Welsh artist Clive Hicks-Jenkins, she and he attended the Italia Conti Academy of Theatre Arts in London at the same time.

She made her film debut in 55 Days at Peking (1963), in which she played a girl orphaned during the Boxer Rebellion whom Charlton Heston takes under his wing. She followed this with a role as a Chinese diplomat's niece in William Castle's juvenile espionage film, 13 Frightened Girls (1963). She portrayed a Yuan dynasty princess in the 1965 historical film Marco the Magnificent. Her final known credited acting role was as a student of Sidney Poitier in To Sir With Love (1967), after which she retired from acting.

== Filmography ==
- 55 Days at Peking (1963) as Teresa
- 13 Frightened Girls (1963) as Mai-Ling
- Marco the Magnificent (1965) as Princess Gogatine (billed as Lee Sue Moon)
- To Sir With Love (1967) as Miss Wong (billed as Lynn Sue Moon)
- The File of the Golden Goose (1969) Girl dancing (uncredited)
