= Junliangcheng =

Town in Tianjin, China

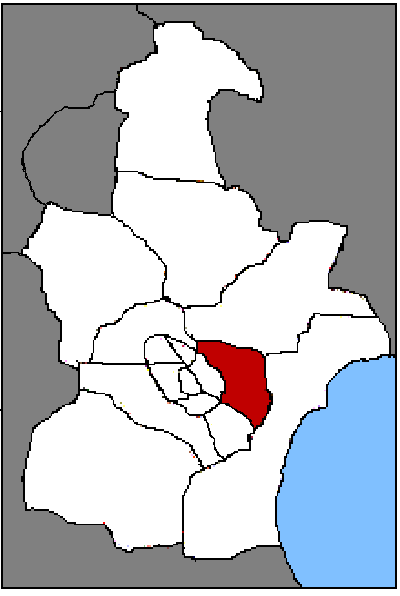
Location of Dongli District in Tianjin.

Junliangcheng is a town in the Dongli District of Tianjin in China.

The area of the current city was previously along the coast of the Bohai, before the 1043 Yellow River Flood shifted the river's course in such a way that the shoreline was moved forward around 23 kilometers (14 mi) over the next century and a half.

Junliangcheng was included among the cities occupied by the Eight-Nation Alliance under the Boxer Protocol and was subsequently an important base for the Fengtian clique during China's Warlord era. As the headquarters for the Fengtian or Northeastern Army, it saw action in the First and Second Zhili–Fengtian Wars.

== See also ==
- Junliangcheng North Railway Station
