= Noel Gerson =

American novelist (1913–1988)

Noel Bertram Gerson (1913–1988) was an American author who wrote 325 books, including several best sellers, among them two screenplay novelizations penned under the pseudonym Samuel Edwards, The Naked Maja, and 55 Days at Peking.

Aside from "Samuel Edwards", which would seem to have been his dedicated by-line for tie-in work, Gerson used the following nine pseudonyms in addition to his own name: Anne Marie Burgess; Michael Burgess; Nicholas Gorham; Paul Lewis; Leon Phillips; Donald Clayton Porter; Dana Fuller Ross; Philip Vail; and Carter A. Vaughan.

== Life ==
He was the son of Sam Gerson, who directed the Shubert theaters in Chicago. Gerson attended the University of Chicago, and served as the campus correspondent for the Chicago Herald-Examiner. Following graduation, he became a reporter at the paper. He later joined Chicago-based WGN as a publicity writer, subsequently becoming its talent director and main scriptwriter. After his World War II military experience in Army intelligence, he began writing TV scripts before beginning his career as an author in 1950. He and his wife Marilyn had a son and three daughters.

== Literary focus ==
Gerson's primary focus was on historical novels, mostly stand-alone, with American history receiving considerable attention. Of note, he wrote a number of historical novels about colonial America and also the United States in its formative years.

Gerson also wrote a large number of biographies and biographical novels. These included several on US presidents, such as Andrew Jackson, James Polk, and Theodore Roosevelt. Many of his biographic works also focused on notable women in history such as Empress Theodora of the Byzantine Empire; William the Conqueror's formidable wife, Matilda of Flanders; and Pocahantas.

During the latter stages of his career, Gerson wrote two series of American historical novels having characters that continued through the series. Using the pen name Dana Fuller Ross, the first was the popular twenty-four book Wagons West series that began in 1978 and is currently being republished. The first four books in this series describe the initial wagon train to Oregon beginning in 1837. Beginning in 1979, Gerson initiated a second series called White Indian using the pen name of Donald Clayton Porter. Set in the late 1600s, it portrays the life of Renno, a child of settlers, who was raised by the Seneca to become a senior warrior.

== Bibliography ==
Gerson was one of the most prolific writers of modern times, with over 150 books verifiably counted to his credit. His work can be divided into three major parts: standalone novels, including biographical ones; series novels, usually under a house pseudonym; and nonfiction. Besides his own name, he also wrote under several pen names.

Fiction:

- The Mohawk Ladder (aka Sword of Fortune) (1951)
- Savage Gentleman: A Novel of the French and Indian War (aka Savage Cavalier) (1951)
- The Cumberland Rifles (1952)
- The Golden Eagle (1953)
- The Impostor (1954)
- Port Royal (1954)
- The Forest Lord: A Romantic Adventure of 18th-Century Charleston (1955)
- The Highwayman (1955)
- The Egyptian Woman (1956)
- When the Wind Blows (1956, repr 1965)
- The Conqueror's Wife (as by Samuel Edwards, 1957)
- Daughter of Eve (1958)
- The Silver Lion (1958)
- The Devil's Prize (as by Samuel Edwards, 1958)
- The Invincibles (as by Carter A. Vaughan, 1958)
- The Charlatan (as by Carter A. Vaughan, 1959, repr 1961)
- Queen's Blade (as by Nicholas Gorham, 1959)
- The Naked Maja (1959)
- The Wilderness (as by Carter A. Vaughan, 1959)
- The Yankee From Tennessee (1960)
- Daughter of Gascony (as by Carter A. Vaughan, 1960)
- The Devil's Bride (as by Carter A. Vaughan, 1960)
- The Nelson Touch (1960)
- The Yankee Brig (1960)
- The Gentle Fury (1961)
- Valley Forge (1961)
- The White Plume (1961)
- The Emperor Ladies (1962)
- The Hittite (1962)
- The Land is Bright (1962)
- The Yankee Brig (as by Carter A. Vaughan, 1962)
- Master of Castile (as by Samuel Edwards, 1962)
- Scoundrels' Brigade (1962)
- The White Plume (as by Samuel Edwards, 1962)
- The Golden Lyre (1963)
- The Trojan (1963)
- The Girl Market (as by Ann Marie and Michael Burgess, 1963)
- The Yankee Rascals (1963)
- 55 Days in Peking (novelization of the film, as by Samuel Edwards, 1963)
- Branded Bride (1963)
- The Twisted Saber: A Biographical Novel of Benedict Arnold (as by Philip Vail, 1963)
- Old Hickory: A Biographical Novel of Andrew Jackson (1964)
- Mister (1964)
- Dragon Cove (as by Carter A. Vaughan, 1964, repr 1979)
- The Yankee Rascals (as by Carter A. Vaughan, 1964)
- The Sea Panther (as by Philip Vail, 1964)
- The Men in Her Life: A Contemporary Novel (as by Nicholas Gorham, 1965)
- The Slender Reed: A Biographical Novel of James Knox Polk (1965)
- Yankee Doodle Dandy: A Biographical Novel of John Hancock (1965)
- Roanoke Warrior (as by Carter A. Vaughan, 1965)
- Give Me Liberty (1966)
- Mr. Madison's War (1966)
- Fortress Fury (as by Carter A. Vaughan, 1966, repr 1981)
- The Anthem (1967)
- I'll Storm Hell (1967)
- The Silver Saber (as by Carter A. Vaughan, 1967)
- Sam Houston: A Biographical Novel (1968)
- Split Bamboo (as by Leon Phillips, 1968)
- The River's Devil (as by Carter A. Vaughan, 1968)
- Jefferson Square (1968)
- The Golden Ghetto (1969)
- The Seneca Hostage (as by Carter A. Vaughan, 1969)
- Theodora (1969) Historical novel about the life of Empress Theodora
- Clear for Action! (1970)
- The Crusader: A Novel on the Life of Margaret Sanger (1970)
- TR: A Biographical Novel About Theodore Roosevelt (1970)
- Warhead (1970)
- Island in the Wind (1971)
- Talk Show (1971)
- Mirror, Mirror (1971)
- Double Vision (1972)
- Temptation to Steal (1972)
- State Trooper (1973)
- The Exploiters (as by Samuel Edwards, 1974)
- All That Glitters (as by Samuel Edwards, 1975)
- The Caves of Guernica (as by Samuel Edwards, 1975)
- The Swamp Fox: Francis Marion (1975)
- Neptune (as by Samuel Edwards, 1976)
- Special Agent (1976)
- Liner: A Novel About a Great Ship (1977)
- The Smugglers (1977)
- The River Devils (as by Carter A. Vaughan, 1981)
- Yankee (as by Dana Fuller Ross, 1982)
- Pony Express (as by Donald Clayton Porter, 1983)
- Yankee Rogue (as by Dana Fuller Ross, 1984)

The books in the Wagons West series (all as by Dana Fuller Ross):

- Independence! (1978)
- Nebraska! (1979)
- Wyoming! (1979)
- Oregon! (1979)
- California! (1980)
- Texas! (1980)
- Colorado! (1981)
- Nevada! (1982)
- Washington! (1982)
- Montana! (1983)
- Dakota! (1983)
- Utah! (1984)
- Idaho! (1984)
- Missouri! (1985)
- Mississippi! (1985)
- Louisiana! (1985)
- Tennessee! (1986)
- Illinois! (1986)
- Wisconsin! (1987)
- Kentucky! (1987)
- Arizona! (1987)
- New Mexico! (1988)
- Oklahoma! (1989)
- Celebration! (1989)

The first twelve books in the White Indian series (all as by Donald Clayton Porter):

- White Indian (1979)
- The Renegade (1980)
- War Chief (1980)
- The Sachem (1981)
- Renno (1981)
- Tomahawk (1982)
- War Cry (1983)
- Ambush (1983)
- Seneca (1984)
- Cherokee (1984)
- Choctaw (1985)
- Seminole (1986)

Biographies and other non-fiction (juv=for juvenile audiences):

- Nathan Hale, Espionage Agent (juv, 1960)
- Neither Sin Nor Shame (1961, as by Michael Burgess)
- Food (juv, 1962)
- Queen of Caprice: A Biography of Kristina of Sweden (as by Paul Lewis, 1962)
- Lady of France: A Biography of Gabrielle D'estrees, Mistress of Henry the Great (as by Paul Lewis, 1963)
- Belgium (1964)
- Kit Carson: Folk Hero and Man (1964)
- Queen of the Plaza: A Biography of Adah Isaacs Menken (as by Paul Lewis, 1964)
- Rock of Freedom: The Story of the Plymouth Colony (1964)
- The Magnificent Adventure of Alexander Mackenzie (as by Philip Vail, 1964)
- Sex and the Mature Man (with Louis P. Saxe, 1964)
- The Magnificent Adventures of Henry Hudson (as by Philip Vail, 1965)
- Light-Horse Harry: A Biography of Washington's Great Cavalryman, General Henry Lee (1966)
- Last Wilderness: The Saga of America's Mountain Men (juv, 1966)
- The Great Rogue: A Biography of Captain John Smith (as by Paul Lewis, 1966, repr 1978 as The Glorious Scoundrel...:)
- Survival: Jamestown: First English Colony in America (juv, 1967)
- Barbary General: The Life of William H. Eaton (1968)
- Franklin: America's Lost State (juv, 1968)
- Yankee Admiral: A Biography of David Dixon Porter (as by Paul Lewis, 1968)
- The Fantastic Breed: Americans in King George's War (as by Leon Phillips, juv, 1968)
- Passage to the West: Great Voyages of Henry Hudson (juv, 1969)
- James Monroe: Hero of America Diplomacy (juv, 1969)
- The Edict of Nantes (juv, 1969)
- P.J., My Friend (the story of his cat, 1969)
- The Divine Mistress: The Life of Émilie du Châtelet, Voltaire's Mistress (1970)
- Free and Independent: The Confederation of the United States, 1781–1791 (juv, 1970)
- Because I Loved Him: The Life and Loves of Lillie Langtry (1971; repr 1972 as Lillie Langtry: A Biography)
- Victor Hugo: A Tumultuous Life (1971, repr 1975 as …: A Biography)
- The Prodigal Genius: The Life and Times of Honoré de Balzac (1972)
- The Sunday Heroes (1972)
- George Sand: A Biography of the First Modern, Liberated Woman (1972)
- Daughter of Earth & Water: A Biography of Mary Wollstonecraft Shelley (1973)
- The Man Who Lost America: A Biography of Gentleman Johnny Burgoyne (as by Paul Lewis, 1973)
- The Grand Incendiary: A Biography of Samuel Adams (as by Paul Lewis, 1973)
- Peter Paul Rubens: A Biography of a Giant (1973)
- First Lady of America: A Romanticized Biography of Pocahontas (1973)
- The Double Lives of Francisco de Goya (as by Samuel Edwards, 1973)
- That Eaton Woman: In Defense of Peggy O'Neal Eaton (1974)
- Sex and the Adult Woman (with Ellen Birchall, 1974)
- Rebel!: A Biography of Tom Paine (as by Samuel Edwards, 1974)
- The Turbulent Life of Aaron Burr: The Great American Rascal (as by Philip Vail, 1974)
- The Velvet Glove: A Life of Dolley Madison (1976)
- Sad Swashbuckler: The Life of William Walker (1976)
- Harriet Beecher Stowe: A Biography (1976)
- Trelawny's World: A Biography of Edward John Trelawny (1977)
- The Trial of Andrew Johnson (1977)
- The Vidocq Dossier: The Story of the World's First Detective (as by Samuel Edwards, 1977, aka Vidocq: Biography of the World's First Detective)
- Statue in Search of a Pedestal: A Biography of the Marquis De Lafayette (1986)
