= Marco the Magnificent =

La Fabuleuse Aventure de Marco Polo
- Directed by: Denys de La Patellière; Noël Howard
- Written by: Raoul Lévy; Jacques Rémy; Jean-Paul Rappeneau
- Based on: The Travels of Marco Polo by Rustichello da Pisa
- Starring: Horst Buchholz; Anthony Quinn
- Release date: 1965
- Countries: France; Italy; Yugoslavia; Egypt; Afghanistan
- Languages: French; Italian; English

La Fabuleuse Aventure de Marco Polo or Marco the Magnificent is a 1965 adventure film directed by Denys de La Patellière and Noël Howard. It was a co-production with involvement of companies in Afghanistan, Yugoslavia, Egypt, France and Italy. Raoul Levy committed suicide in December 1966 after losing most of his fortune financing this film.

== Plot ==
Marco Polo (Horst Bucholz) is idling around in Venice when Pope Gregory commissions him to take a message of peace and understanding to the Emperor of China on the presumption that a young courier might stand a better chance of reaching China.

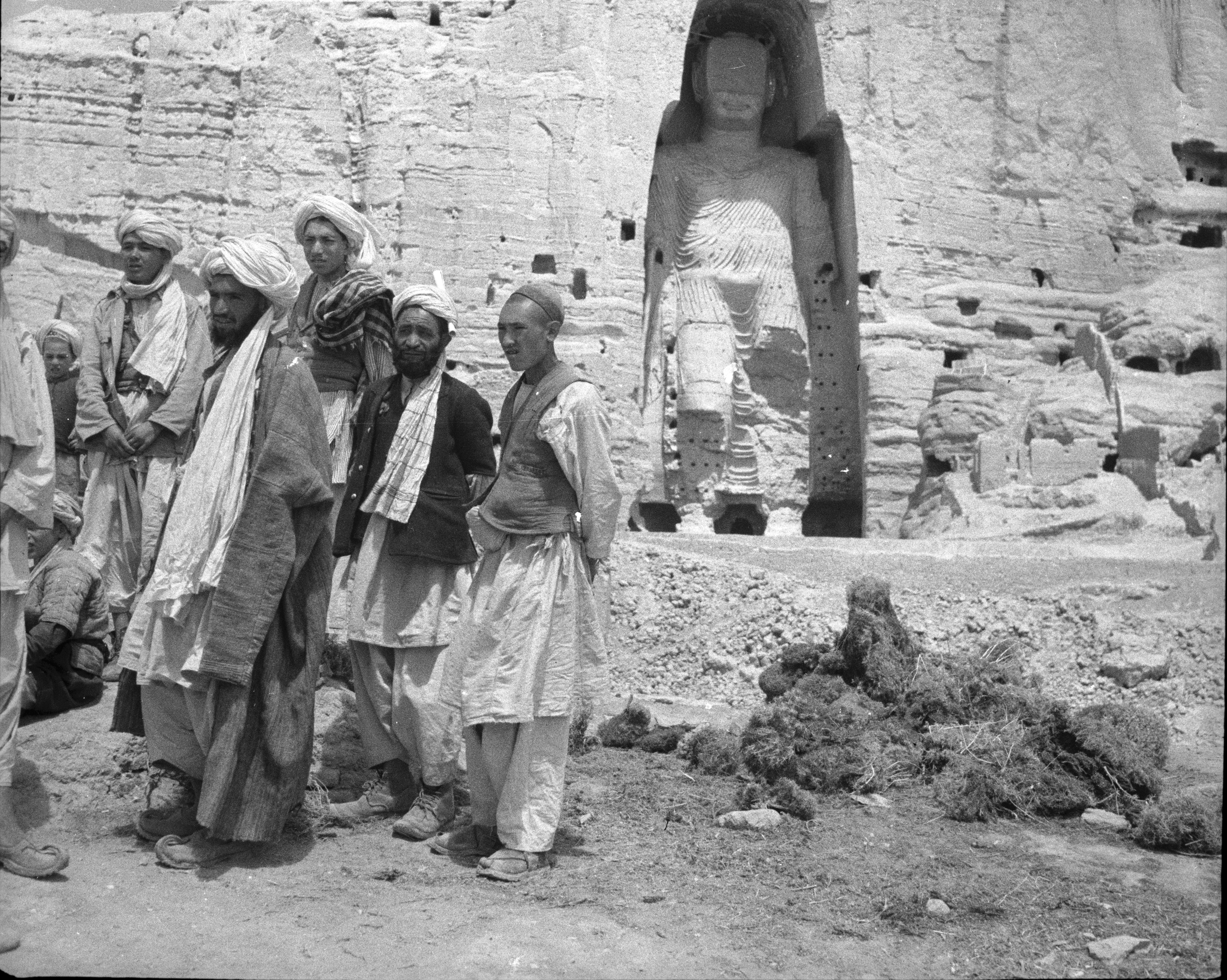
The exterior of the lair of the Old Man of the Mountain was shot near the Bamiyan Buddhas in Afghanistan. Photograph from 1939 or 1940.

On the journey his escort is attacked and killed leaving Marco Polo on his own. He meets with The Old Man of the Mountain; braves all varieties of climatic conditions; is captured by the Mongols and witnesses a sort of "Miss China" competition in order to provide the Emperor with an Empress.

== Cast ==
- Horst Buchholz as Marco Polo
- Anthony Quinn as Kublai Khan, Mongol Emperor of China
- Omar Sharif as Sheik Alla Hou, 'The Desert Wind'
- Orson Welles as Akerman, Marco's tutor
- Akim Tamiroff as the Old Man of the Mountain
- Elsa Martinelli as the woman with the whip
- Robert Hossein as Prince Nayam, a Mongol rebel leader
- Grégoire Aslan as Achmed Abdullah
- Massimo Girotti as Niccolò, Marco's father
- Folco Lulli as Spinello, a Venetian merchant
- Guido Alberti as Pope Gregory X
- Lynne Sue Moon as Princess Gogatine (credited as Lee Sue Moon)
- Bruno Cremer as Guillaume de Tripoli, a Knight Templar
- Jacques Monod as Nicolo de Vicenza, a Knight Templar
- Mića Orlović as Matteo, Marco's uncle

== Production ==
Filming began in 1962 starring Alain Delon in the title role and co starring Dorothy Dandridge. Shooting halted after $700,000 had been spent. It started again two years later with a new star, writer and director. Filming took place over six months, mostly in Yugoslavia.

Rostislav Doboujinsky worked on the design of the clothes and caparacons for the men, horses and elephants - the living figures - of the chess game.

== See also ==
- Examples of yellowface
