= 13 Frightened Girls =

1963 Cold War spy film directed by William Castle

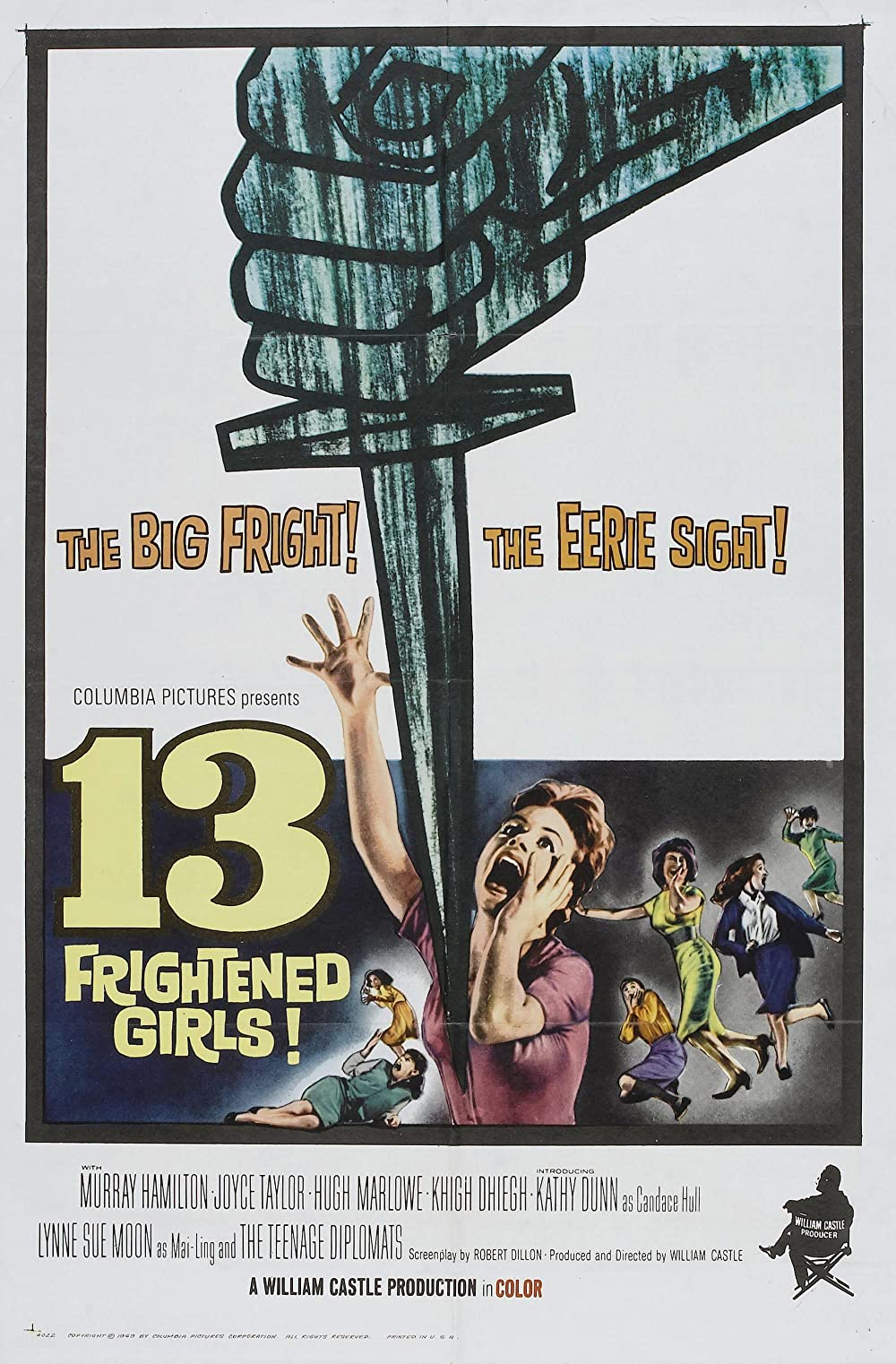
- Directed by: William Castle
- Screenplay by: Robert Dillon
- Story by: Otis L. Guernsey Jr.
- Produced by: William Castle
- Starring: Murray Hamilton; Kathy Dunn; Joyce Taylor; Hugh Marlowe
- Cinematography: Gordon Avil
- Edited by: Edwin H. Bryant
- Music by: Van Alexander
- Production company: William Castle Pictures
- Distributed by: Columbia Pictures
- Release dates: March 1963 (Australia); August 28, 1963 (Los Angeles); September 11, 1963 (New York City)
- Running time: 89 minutes

Trailer for the film

13 Frightened Girls (also known as 13 Frightened Girls! and The Candy Web) is a 1963 Pathécolor Cold War spy film directed and produced by William Castle. Kathy Dunn stars as a teenage sleuth who finds herself embroiled in international espionage.

Castle, who was famous for promoting his films with gimmicks, generated publicity by advertising for girls from 13 countries to compete for parts as daughters of diplomats. However, not all of the 15 actresses were from the countries that they represented in the film; for example, American Judy Pace plays a Liberian.

== Plot ==
After a 16-year-old girl Candy Hull develops a crush on intelligence agent Wally Sanders in London, she helps him to uncover a communist plot against the United States.

== Cast ==
- Murray Hamilton as Wally Sanders
- Kathy Dunn as Candace "Candy" Hull
- Joyce Taylor as Soldier
- Hugh Marlowe as John Hull
- Khigh Dhiegh as Kang
- Charlie Briggs as Mike
- Norma Varden as Miss Pittford
- Garth Benton as Peter Van Hagen
- Emil Sitka as Ludwig (uncredited)

The other diplomats' daughters:

- María Cristina Servera (Argentina)
- Janet Mary Prance (Australia)
- Penny Anne Mills (Canada)
- Alexandra Bastedo as Alex (United Kingdom) as Alexandra Lendon Bastedo
- Ariane Glaser (France)
- Ilona Schütze as Ilona (Germany)
- Anna Baj (Italy)
- Aiko Sakamoto (Japan)
- Gina Trikonis as Natasha (Russia)
- Judy Pace (Liberia)
- Luz Gloria Hervias (Mexico)
- Marie-Louise Bielke (Sweden)
- Ignacia Farias Luque (Venezuela)
- Lynne Sue Moon as Mai-Ling (China)

== Release ==
13 Frightened Girls was first released in Australia as The Candy Web in March 1963.

In April 1963, the film's title was changed to 13 Frightened Girls in preparation for its American release. The world premiere of 13 Frightened Girls with its new title was held at the Circle Theatre in Indianapolis on June 13, 1963. An advance screening at other Indiana theaters had taken place on June 11. The film premiered in Los Angeles on August 28, 1963, and in New York on September 11, 1963.

In many American markets, 13 Frightened Girls was released as a second feature along with Gidget Goes to Rome.

== Reception ==
Contemporary critical reviews were generally negative and panned the film for its implausible plot.

The News & Observer wrote: "The incredibly contrived goings-on that occur in '13 Frightened Girls' and dramatic absurdities of the production are more that can be tolerated by any but the most puerile audiences. The picture fluctuates between comedy and suspense melodrama. Incidents are built up, then dropped like hot political potatoes whenever explanations and resolutions are in order."

Carol Taylor of the Fort Worth Star-Telegram wrote: "'13 Frightened Girls' ... is something of a misleading title. Most of the time there's just one frightened girl. ... With all the energy and vivacity of any death-defying 16-year-old, she plays tennis, attends parties, bewitches boys and digs up startling bits of classified information simultaneously."

In The New York Times, critic Louis Calta wrote: "The young Mata Hari is vigorously played by pretty Kathy Dunn, who was one of the Trapp children in The Sound of Music. If only young Kathy could have raised her voice in song instead of playing detective, things might have been different at the United States Embassy."

== Home media ==
The film was released on DVD in 2009 as part of the William Castle Film Collection. Sony also released a DVD of the film by itself. The film was released on Blu-ray in 2016 by Mill Creek Entertainment as part of a double-feature disc with the 1960 Castle film 13 Ghosts.

== See also ==
- List of American films of 1963
