= First Zhili–Fengtian War =

1922 conflict in China

- Part of Warlord Era
Date	April 10, 1922 – June 18, 1922
Location	Zhili, China
Result	Zhili victory

Belligerents
(Republic of China (1912–1949)) Zhili clique	Fengtian clique

Commanders and leaders
Wu Peifu	Zhang Zuolin

Strength
100,000	120,000

Casualties and losses
Heavy	Heavy (20,000 killed 10,000 deserted 40,000 surrendered)

The First Zhili–Fengtian War (First Chihli-Fengtien War; simplified Chinese: 第一次直奉战争; traditional Chinese: 第一次直奉戰爭; pinyin: Dìyīcì Zhífèng Zhànzhēng) was a 1922 conflict in the Republic of China's Warlord Era between the Zhili and Fengtian cliques for control of Beijing. The war led to the defeat of the Fengtian clique and the expulsion of its leader, Zhang Zuolin, from the coalition Zhili-Fengtian government in Beijing. Wu Peifu was credited as the strategist behind Zhili's victory.

== Prelude ==
Having jointly seized Beijing in 1920, the Fengtian and Zhili cliques controlled the nominal government of China. Tensions soon began building between the two cliques in their uneasy coalition government.

In 1922 the Zhang Zuolin installed Liang Shiyi as premier. Zhang and Liang were supported by Japan, while the Zhili had the backing of the British and Americans. The Japanese government had once supported their enemy, the Anhui clique, but had switched sides soon after the change of power. On 25 December 1921, a cabinet under Liang Shiyi's leadership was formed with strong support from Zhang Zuolin, whereupon the new cabinet immediately granted amnesty to six former cabinet members of the Anhui clique. The Zhili clique strongly opposed the plan but were overruled.

Chinese government funding generated from Japanese loans flowed to the Fengtian Clique's army. The political conflict intensified as the new cabinet refused to give some $3 million in military budgets previously promised to the Zhili clique. As a result, Wu Peifu and other Zhili clique members forced Liang Shiyi to resign on 25 January 1922. With the pro-Fengtian clique cabinet having collapsed only a month after its formation, Zhang Zuolin threatened to resolve the conflict by force. Cao Kun of the Zhili Clique attempted to negotiate a peace agreement with Zhang; the negotiations failed. On 25 April 1922, the Zhili Clique declared war on the Fengtian Clique.

Zhang negotiated with Sun Yat-sen's Kuomintang (KMT) in Guangdong and the remaining Anhui Clique forces in Zhejiang. The KMT and Anhui Clique agreed to attack Fengtian from the south. Neither followed through on these promises once the war began.

== Forces ==
Zhili armies deployed around 100,000 troops, while the Fengtian army deployed some 120,000 troops. The Fengtian Clique forces had an initial advantage in numbers and in weaponry, in part because of their support from Japan. Zhili Clique forces had more combat experience.

The Zhili armies' commander-in-chief and commander of the western front was Wu Peifu. The commanders-in-chief of the central front and eastern fronts were Wang Chengbin (王承斌) and Zhang Guorong (张国熔), respectively. Zhang Fulai (张富来) was the deputy commander-in-chief of the eastern front:

Zhang Zuolin was commander-in-chief of the Fengtian army and commander of the eastern front. His deputy commander-in-chief and deputy commander of the eastern front was Sun Liechen (孙烈臣). The commander of the western front was Zhang Jinghui. Under him were three echelons commanded by Bao Deshan (鲍德山), Zhang Xueliang and Li Jinglin (李景林).

== Strategies ==
In a repeat of the earlier Zhili–Anhui War, the Fengtian army was to attack the Zhili army on two fronts, east and west. The general headquarters of the Fengtian army was at Junliangcheng, which was also its headquarters of the eastern front. The commander-in-chief of the Fengtian army, Zhang Zuolin, personally led the eastern front and on 29 April 1922, he reached his general headquarters and immediately ordered the attack. Zhang Jinghui was named commander-in-chief of the Fengtian western front, which was divided into three echelons. The headquarters of the Fengtian army's western front was in Changxindian (长辛店), and the Fengtian army in the west was tasked to directly attack the Zhili army's headquarters in Baoding.

The Zhili army was deployed across three fronts. Wu Peifu's force, headed by the 3rd Division in the west, was headquartered in the region of Glazed Glass River (Liulihe, 琉璃河). Wang Chengbin (王承斌)'s force was spearheaded by the 23rd Division at Gu'an (固安). Zhang Guorong (张国熔)'s force, with the 26th Division, was stationed in the east at Great City (Dacheng, 大城), and later was reinforced by Zhang Fulai (张富来)'s 24th Division. Wu Peifu was the commander-in-chief of all the Zhili forces.

Successful Zhili tactics included Wu's effective use of mines and electrified barbed wire, which drew upon World War I tactics.

== Western front ==
Fengtian troops deployed on 10 April 1922. After war broke on April 29, the Zhili army on the eastern front was driven back to Renqiu and Hejian (河间). Western Zhili forces did not make any progress under the heavy shelling of the Fengtian army. On April 30 Wu Peifu personally went to the front line to order heavy shelling of the Fengtian front, while his main force outflanked the Fengtian rear. As Zhili troops launched a surprise attack on May 4, the 16th Division of the Fengtian army (composed of ex-Zhili troops commanded by Feng Guozhang) defected to Wu Peifu. The Temporarily Organized 1st Division of the Fengtian army was forced to retreat from Fengtai, and its defense collapsed on the western front. It was only when the 1st Division of the Fengtian army was deployed in a counterattack that the Zhili advance was checked and Changxindian was retaken.

This successful counteroffensive by the Fengtian clique was, however, short-lived. Wu Peifu changed tactics by faking a retreat, luring the advancing Fengtian army into an ambush. As the unsuspecting Fengtian troops advanced, they overstretched themselves. Seizing the opportunity, Zhili troops flanked the enemy and achieved victory. This time the victory was complete; the remaining Fengtian troops of the western front were completely annihilated, and the Zhili army turned its attention eastward.

== Eastern front ==
The Fengtian army on the eastern front was initially victorious, with the Zhili forces holding on in a desperate rearguard action. However, as news of their defeat in the west reached the first echelon of the Fengtian army, brigade commander Bao Deshan (鲍德山) refused to continue to attack the enemy and left his flank dangerously exposed. In danger of being cut off, Zhang Zuolin ordered a general retreat to avoid total annihilation. The Fengtian second echelon, under the command of his son, Zhang Xueliang, was the cream of the Fengtian army and became the main target of the Zhili attack. Having achieved complete victory in the west, Wu Peifu redeployed his crack troops (the 3rd and 26th Divisions) and personally directed their attack on Zhang Xueliang's unit. Although Zhang Xueliang successfully repulsed the enemy's attack with minor casualties, they were eventually forced to lead an organized retreat, abandoning ground.

The third echelon of the Fengtian army on the eastern front was under the command of Li Jinglin (李景林), and initially succeeded in beating back attacks at Yaoma crossing (Yaomadu, 姚马渡). Though capturing over 1000 enemy troops, reports of the western defeat saw morale collapse. Taking advantage of the situation, Zhili forces renewed attacks on the third echelon headquarters in Horse Factory (Machang, 马厂), succeeding in killing and capturing over 7000 Fengtian troops and forcing the latter to give up Poplar Willow Green (Yangliuqing, 杨柳青). Third-echelon forces retreated to Northern Warehouse (Beicang, 北仓). While preparing to organize a defense at Junliangcheng, the Fengtian troops ran into nearly 20,000 Zhili reinforcements, which had arrived by train. The Fengtian troops were defeated, and the survivors were forced to withdraw to Luanzhou.

By this time it was obvious the Fengtian clique was soundly defeated, and on May 5, the 23rd Division of the Zhili army—under the command of Wang Chengbin (王承斌)--entered Tianjin. Fengtian forces suffered over 20,000 dead, 10,000 desertions and 40,000 troops surrendered or taken prisoner by the Zhili clique.

== Conclusion ==
By this time British missionaries convinced the Zhili clique that the British consul at Luanzhou could broker a peace treaty to terminate hostilities. The British consul suggested a general outline to Zhang Zuolin, whereby he would withdraw all troops from the region inside Shanhaiguan and Zhili forces would cease giving chase. On June 18 representatives from both sides signed the peace treaty aboard a British warship anchored off the coast of Qinhuangdao, agreeing to the general guideline suggested by the British consul.

The fighting had involved over 100,000 troops on each side, and both had heavy casualties.

== Consequences ==
Shanhaiguan subsequently became the border between the two cliques, ending the First Zhili–Fengtian War with a resounding Zhili victory. Armies led by Wu Peifu took control of the central government in Beijing. The Zhili Clique consolidated control in Henan and gained control over Rehe (Jehol), Chahar, and Suiyuan. Wu's Zhili clique ruled the Beiyang government alone until the 1924 Beijing Coup.

The Fengtian clique retreated back to Manchuria. Zhang began rebuilding in his army, including developing naval and air elements. Zhang developed alliances with the KMT and the Anhui Clique forces led by Lu Yongxiang in the Zhejiang-Shanghai area.

Zhang's forces brought captured radio equipment and expertise back to the northeast after their defeat. This became the basis for the radio industry in Manchuria and Zhang's administration built two of the most powerful and largest radio transmitters in Asia. Zhang became the patron of China's first government broadcasting. The northeast's emphasis on radio included using it for education and propaganda as part of domestic competition with the KMT and with more technologically advanced states like Japan, the Soviet Union, and Britain.

Zhang again attempted to eliminate the Zhili Clique, and the Second Zhili-Fengtian War occurred from 15 September to 3 November 1924. It resulted in Zhang's defeat of Wu. China remained politically unstable and fragmented.

== See also ==
- List of battles of the Chinese Civil War
- National Revolutionary Army
- Chinese Civil War
- Warlord Era
- Zhang Zuolin
- Wu Peifu
