= Carl de Vinck de Deux-Orp =

Belgian diplomat, noble, and art collector

Baron Carl de Vinck de Deux-Orp (1859–1931) was a Belgian diplomat, noble, and art collector. He was the Belgian Minister to Qing dynasty China from May 1896 to April 1899. In 1896 he accompanied Viceroy Li Hongzhang during his visit and tour of Belgium. Baron de Vinck was later active in Paris as an art collector.
