= Fridolin Marinus Knobel =

Dutch diplomat and politician

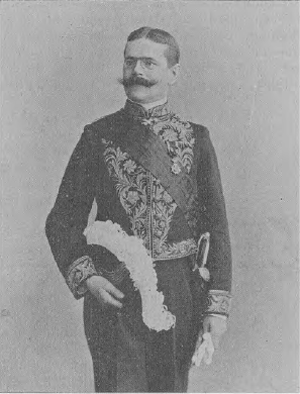
Fridolin Marinus Knobel, 1903

Fridolin Marinus (Frits) Knobel (18 May 1857 – 16 October 1933) was a Dutch diplomat and politician.

He was born in Amsterdam to parents who owned a confectionary and lunch room in the Kalverstraat. After graduating from secondary school he worked at his uncle's cigar factory for some time and as a tobacco trader on the Amsterdam exchange. In 1879 he took his consular exams and was admitted as a student-consul at the Foreign department and was stationed in Berlin from 1882 to 1883. He became vice-consul in Saint Petersburg in 1883, to be appointed Consul General in Tehran in 1889. He stayed in Tehran until 1895 and briefly was Consul general in Beijing. In 1902 he received a new appointment as Consul general in Tehran. In 1903 Mozaffar ad-Din Shah Qajar presented him with a beautiful grey. A very special photo of Knobel on this horse was published some years later. Next to the horse stands his servant Reza, later to be known as Reza Shah Pahlavi. In 1904 his government ordered his return to The Hague.

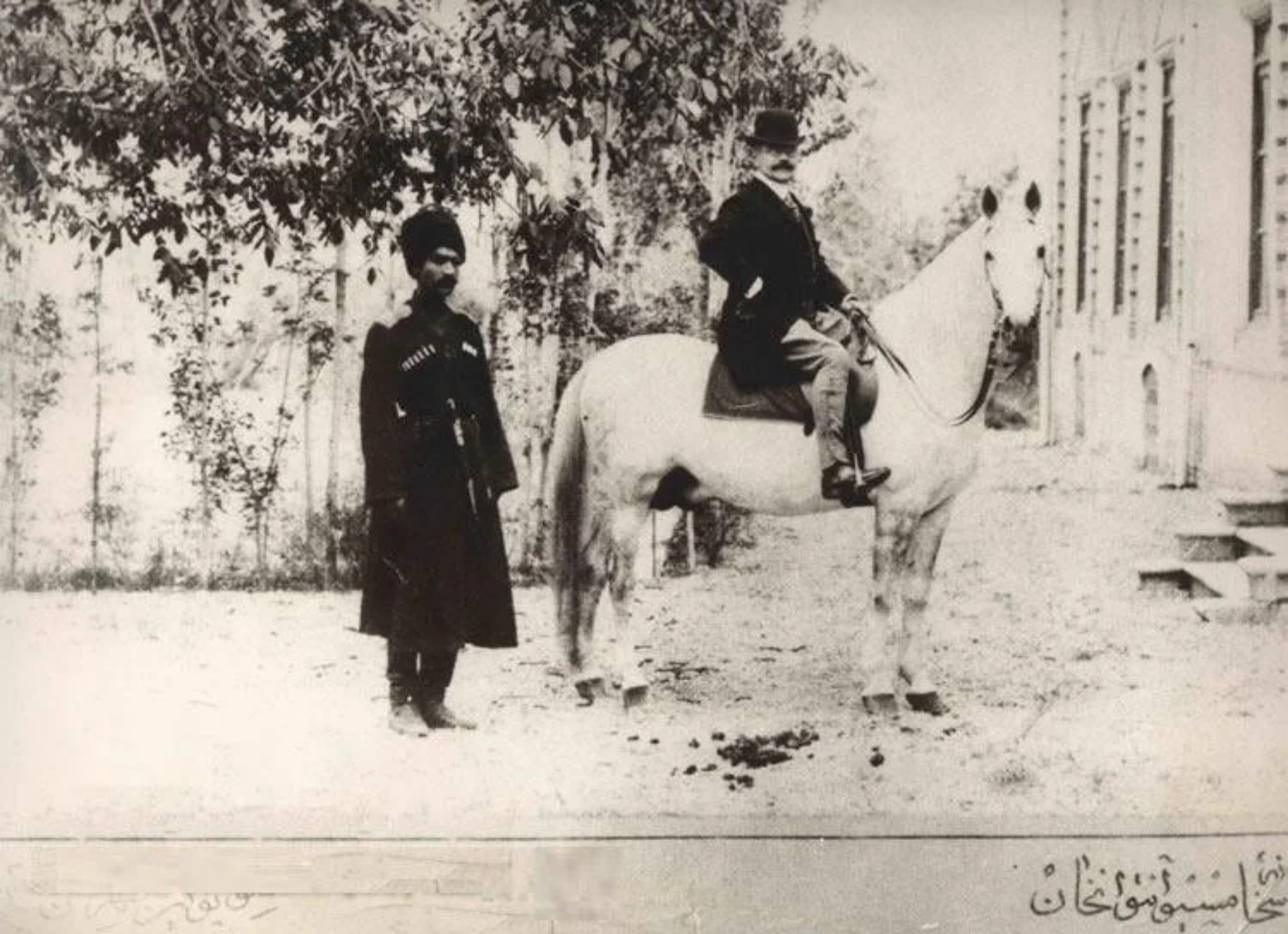
Fridolin Marinus Knobel, the Dutch Consul-General in Tehran, on his horse. Stands beside him is his servant Reza, later to be known as Reza Shah Pahlavi (the king of Iran), when he served as a horse groom in the Netherlands's embassy in Tehran

From 1905 until 1913 Knobel was Consul general in Pretoria, from 1913 until 1918 a liberal member of parliament and from 1920 until 1922 a merchant in Singapore and the Dutch Indies. In 1923 he again joined the foreign service and was appointed Dutch consul and in 1928 Consul general in Leipzig. In 1933, representing the Netherlands he followed the trial against Marinus van der Lubbe. He did not witness the conclusion of this trial, as he died on October 16, 1933, of a heart attack.
