= Bernardo de Cólogan =

Spanish Diplomat

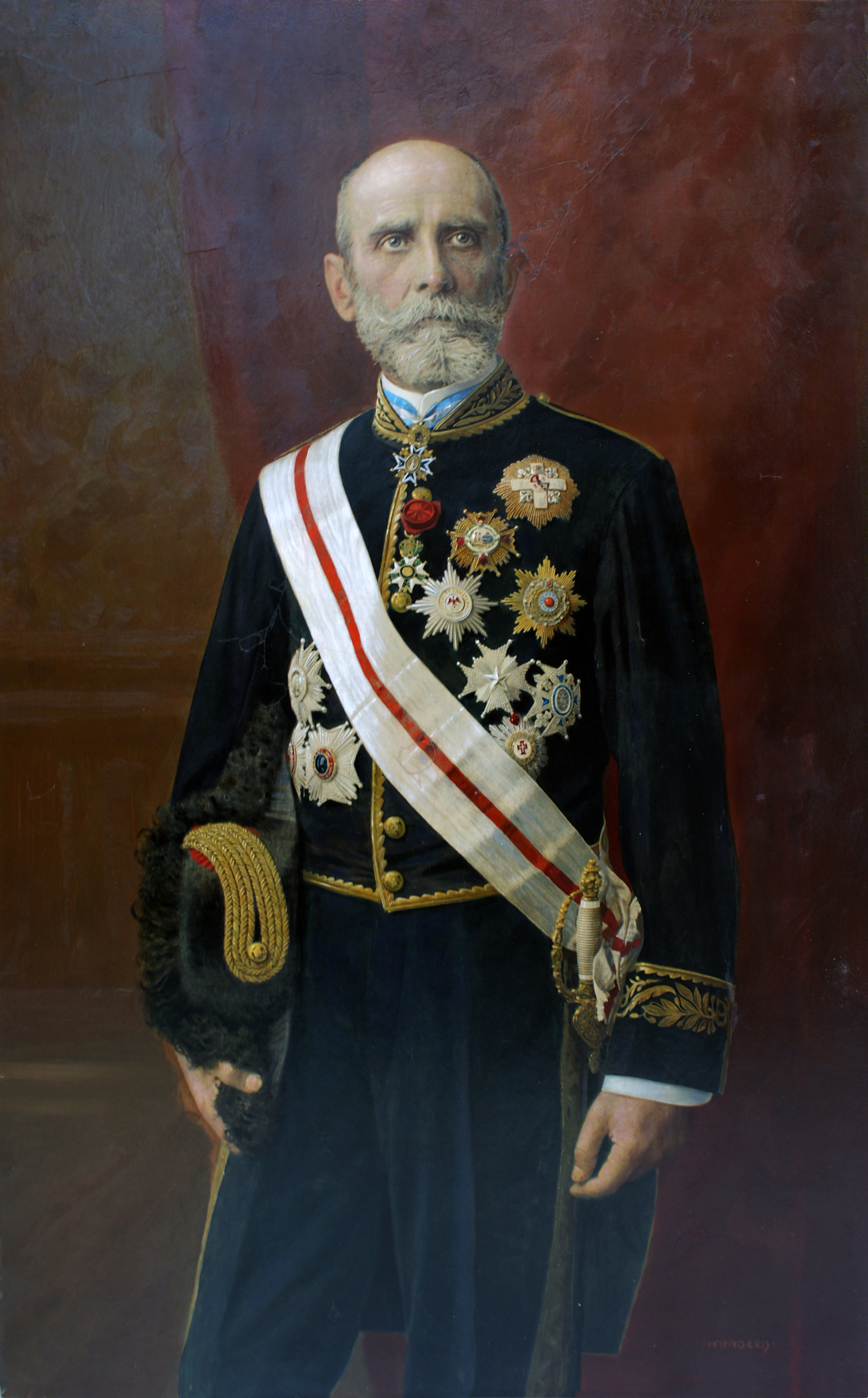
Cólogan in 1916

Bernardo Jacinto de Cólogan y Cólogan (13 January 1847 – 30 July 1921) was a Spanish diplomat best known for being doyen of the diplomatic corps during the Siege of the International Legations in 1900.

Born in Puerto de la Cruz on 13 January 1847, Cólogan was the second son of the marqués de la Candía, Tomás Fidel Cólogan y Bobadilla de Eslaba, and his wife, Laura Micaela Cólogan-Franchi y Heredia. He studied at the Royal Seminary of Vergara and the University of Oxford. He entered the diplomatic service in 1864, when he was posted to Athens as a joven de lengauas (young interpreter). He subsequently held the same post in Beijing.

Cólogan served as secretary of the legations in Constantinople (1868–1871), secretary second class in Caracas (1871–1875) and secretary first class in Mexico (1875–1881). In 1876, he married María del Carmen de Sevilla y Mora in Veracruz. They had a daughter and a son. In 1881, the year that Colombia and Spain established relations, he was sent to Colombia, where he served as resident minister from 1883 to 1894, the year in which he was dispatched to China as envoy extraordinary and minister plenipotentiary. He was doyen of the diplomatic corps during the Boxer Rebellion and the subsequent war with China, including the siege of the legations. He was retained in that post after Spain's defeat in the Spanish–American War of 1898 because as doyen he could bolster Spain's prestige. Although "ineffective" as a leader, his "natural-born optimis[m]" was an asset during the siege.

Cólogan served as minister plenipotentiary first class to Morocco in Tangier (1902–1905), then as representative at Washington (1905–1907), again in Mexico (1907–1914) during the Mexican Revolution and finally at Buenos Aires (1914–1915). He died in Madrid on 30 July 1921.
