= Boxer Indemnity Scholarship =

US program for Chinese exchange students

- Traditional Chinese: 庚子賠款獎學金
- Simplified Chinese: 庚子赔款奖学金
Transcriptions
Standard Mandarin
- Hanyu Pinyin: Gēngzǐ péikuǎn jiǎngxuéjīn
- Wade–Giles: Keng-tzu P'ei-k'uan Chiang-hsüeh-chin

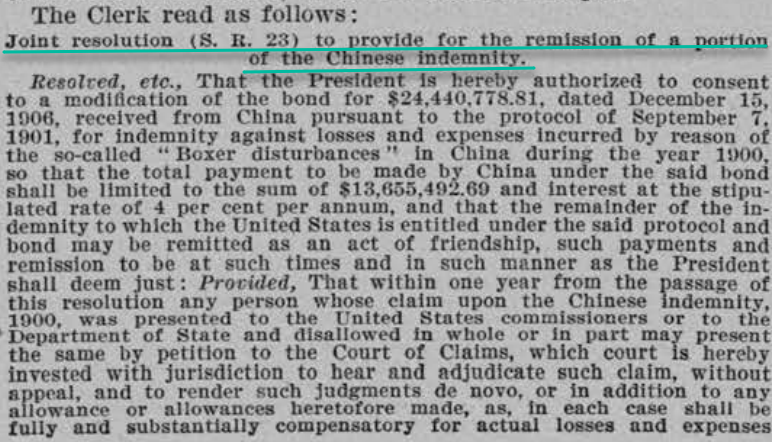
US Congress Joint Resolution (S. R. 23) 1908 remission of a portion of the Chinese indemnity

The Boxer Indemnity Scholarship Program was a scholarship program for Chinese students to be educated in the United States, funded by the Boxer Indemnities. On May 25, 1908, the U.S. Congress Senate and House of Representatives passed the Joint Resolution (S. R. 23) to return to China the excess of Boxer Indemnity, amounting to over $11.9 million ($426.4 million in 2025). Despite fierce controversies over returning the excess payment, President Theodore Roosevelt's administration decided to establish the Boxer Indemnity Scholarship Program to educate Chinese students in the United States. President Roosevelt recognized this program as a chance for "American-directed reform in China" that could improve United States–China relations and raise America's standing in the world. Instead of copying European imperialism and using military means to reap a short-term financial gain, Roosevelt established the program to ensure peace and trade in China in the "most satisfactory and subtle of all ways", while helping the United States gain respect and take a global leadership position.

Since its inception, the Boxer Indemnity Scholarship Program has been called "the most important scheme for educating Chinese students in America and arguably the most consequential and successful in the entire foreign-study movement of twentieth century China."

On July 16, 1925, President Calvin Coolidge approved "Executive Order 4268—Remission of Further Payments of Installments of the Chinese Indemnity" to implement the Congress's "Joint Resolution to provide for the remission of further payments of the annual installments of the Chinese indemnity" approved on May 21, 1924.

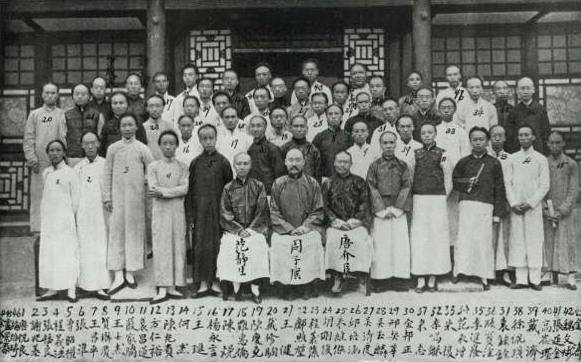
The first group of Boxer Indemnity Scholarship Program students in 1909. Future Republic of China president Zhou Ziqi is seated in the front center.

== Background ==
=== Chinese Educational Mission ===
Prior to the establishment of the Boxer Indemnity Scholarship Program, Yung Wing's Chinese Educational Mission also provided some higher education opportunities in the United States for Chinese students. After graduating from Yale University as the first Chinese graduate of a university in the United States, Yung Wing persuaded the Qing government to send groups of young Chinese students to the United States to study Western science and technology in 1871. Beginning in 1872, with the support of some reform-minded officials of the Qing dynasty, Yung established the Chinese Educational Mission to send 120 Chinese students to study in the New England region of the United States. However, this short-lived effort was disbanded in 1881, a year prior to the Chinese Exclusion Act, and there was little activity afterwards.

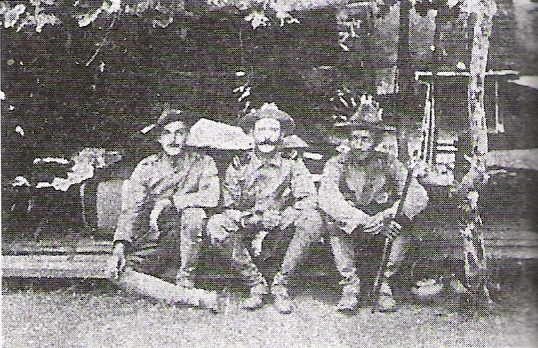
US troops in China during the Boxer Rebellion in 1900

=== Boxer Protocol ===
In 1899, a group of Chinese nationals known as Boxers, went on a campaign to expel all foreign influences in China. The uprising, known as the Boxer Rebellion, began as an anti-foreign, anti-imperialist, village-based movement in northern China, in response to fears of westerners seizing Chinese territory, requiring concession, seeking protection in court for their followers, and causing drought and natural disasters. Boxer groups attacked railroad builders, who were held to be violating feng shui, and Christians, who were held responsible for the foreign domination of China. In the summer of 1900, the Eight-Nation Alliance—comprising Austria-Hungary, France, Germany, Italy, Japan, Russia, Britain and the United States—sent troops to relieve the siege of the foreigners and Chinese Christians in the Legation Quarters. The Allies forced the Qing government to sign the Boxer Protocol, which required the Qing government to pay 450 million taels of fine silver as indemnity over a course of 39 years to the eight nations involved. Under the exchange rates at the time, this was equal to US$335 million or £67 million. Including interest, the Qing finally paid 982,238,150 taels (equivalent to 37,000 short tons of silver), of which the U.S. share was 7.32%.

=== Return of excess indemnity ===
The nationwide boycott of American goods in China was precipitated by several interconnected factors: the residual impact of the Boxer Rebellion's failure, reported instances of mistreatment of Chinese immigrants in the United States, and the U.S. federal government's contradictory stance of renewing the Chinese Exclusion Act while advocating for the Open Door Policy in China. The movement had terrible consequences for American trade in China:

In ten months, $21,125,838 worth of cotton goods alone went from this country to the Chinese empire. Not only is this export trade menaced by a Chinese boycott, but our hold on much greater future development is practically given over to European nations. There are few interests in the United States that will not feel the pinch of a Chinese boycott in one way or another.

At the same time, Qing representative to the United States Liang Cheng (Note: Liang Cheng himself had come to the U.S. at age 12 as part of the fourth group of Yung Wing's Chinese Educational Mission. He was educated at Phillips Academy and Amherst College.) learned that the terms of the Boxer Protocol awarded the U.S. more than it had originally demanded and initiated a campaign to pressure the U.S. into returning the difference to China. In addition, American missionaries in China, sympathetic to the suffering of the average Chinese family, were clamoring for the return of the excess Boxer Indemnity. Roosevelt seized on this opportunity and set forth his intention to "do the Chinese justice about this indemnity" in his Atlanta speech where he declared: "we [Americans] cannot expect China to do us justice unless we do China justice". Roosevelt realized that if the United States were to help China and return the excess of the Boxer Indemnity while all the other powers were taking its territory and exploiting its people, "by a very small effort the good-will of the Chinese may be won over in a large and satisfactory way". However, the American minister to China William Woodville Rockhill strongly opposed the idea of returning the money to the corrupted Qing government as he believed that the money would not escape their greed.

== Establishment ==
Among the numerous proposals for the use of the remittance, Roosevelt inclined toward "cultural investment" through education, envisioning education as a bridge across the Pacific through which the United States could extend its influence to the Far East. As Japan and the European powers carved out spheres of influence in China, the conservative Qing government finally sought to study Western technology and adopt Western policies in order to reform China and meet the Western powers as equals. During that time, many of the Western-returned students such as Liang Cheng and Tang Shaoyi "formerly pushed to the margins of government and shunned due to their Western influence, were brought into power as the fortunes of reformers improved".

In 1906, the President of the University of Illinois, Edmund J. James, who led the university from 1904 to 1920, proposed to President Theodore Roosevelt a plan to establish a scholarship program to send Chinese students to the U.S. James's 1906 letter noted to President Roosevelt,

China is upon the verge of a revolution ... The nation which succeeds in educating the young Chinese of the present generation will be the nation which for a given expenditure of effort will reap the largest possible returns in moral, intellectual and commercial influence.

However, the tendency in China at that time was to "adopt the policy of Japan, and so engage Japan as her instructor". As Japan's military and political influence developed rapidly, Roosevelt's administration could not allow the large influx of Chinese students to Japan continue rising and watch their Pacific rival take over China through intellectual domination. Therefore, he quickly "assented in April 1906 to the wisdom of Smith's proposal" and decided to establish the Boxer Indemnity Scholarship Program to "turn the current of Chinese students" to America. The following year Roosevelt expressed this message to the Senate and House of Representatives in his annual address:

Mr. Roosevelt announces the intention of the United States Government to release China from all payments in connection with the Boxer war indemnity in excess of the sum necessary for the actual indemnity to the United States... The United States, he adds, 'should help in every practicable way in the education of the Chinese people, so that the vast and populous Empire of China may gradually adapt itself to modern conditions. One way of doing this is by promoting the coming of Chinese students to this country and making it attractive to them to take courses at our Universities and higher educational institutions. Our educators should, so far as possible, take concerted action toward this end.'

Although President Roosevelt claimed that his intention was to help China "adapt itself to modern conditions", he in fact aimed to direct reform in China by creating an influential group of American-educated-Chinese leaders. With China's reform-friendly environment, the American-returned students would occupy important positions in politics due to their knowledge of American bureaucracy. Their education in American high schools and colleges, which would take place at a formative period of their lives, would have "a substantial impact on their political, emotional and even physical development". They would have a special sentiment toward America and would be grateful to the U.S. government for their educational opportunities. Subsequently, they would seek to model the new China after the U.S. rather than Japan, and prefer American goods. As Liang Cheng, the Chinese minister to the U.S. stated, this group of students would be able to "insure a peace and trade in the Far East that treaties and military forces cannot insure". The impact of educational exchange could extend far beyond the educational field. It was, as Edmund J. James envisioned, the most "satisfactory and subtle" way to "reap the largest possible returns in moral, intellectual, and commercial influence", because "trade follows moral and spiritual domination far more inevitably than it follows the flag". The establishment of the Boxer Indemnity Scholarship Program was not only "an act of friendship" as Roosevelt claimed, it was also a cultural investment for bridging China with the U.S. and a farsighted scheme for peacefully controlling China's reform and development.

Despite further proposals by the Chinese to use the funds within China, the settlement was made on American terms.

== Development ==
The program, set up in 1909, funded the selection, preparatory training, transportation to the United States, and study for the scholarship beneficiaries. Part of the first remission of money included the establishment of a preparatory school in Beijing for Chinese graduates pursuing further studies at American universities. The preparatory school, established on 29 April 1911 on the site of a former royal garden, was named Tsinghua College (清华学堂; Qīnghuá xuétáng). The faculty members for sciences were recruited by the YMCA from the United States and its graduates transferred directly to American schools as juniors upon graduation. The school was later expanded to offer four-year undergraduate and post-graduate programs and became Tsinghua University.

A second remission in 1924 provided for the establishment of the China Foundation (中华文化教育基金会; Zhōnghuá wénhuà jiàoyù jījīnhuì), which would in turn fund the China Institute in New York City in 1926.

From 1909 to 1937, the Boxer Indemnity Scholarship Program sent around 1,300 Chinese students to study in the United States. Drawing candidates from across China, the examination process for this prestigious scholarship was highly competitive: among 630 candidates in 1909, only 47 were selected. In light of China's Self-Strengthening Movement during that time, the Qing government urged students to focus their studies on the fields on Science, Engineering, Agriculture, Medicine and Commerce. The Massachusetts Institute of Technology (MIT) was thus one of the most popular destinations. In 1929, after Tsinghua had become a true university itself, the Boxer Indemnity Scholarship Program was opened to all candidates. A total of five groups of scholars were educated in the U.S. before the Japanese invasion of China in 1937.

== Legacy ==
A number of prominent Chinese and Chinese Americans were beneficiaries of the Boxer Indemnity Scholarship Program, including MIT's first Chinese architect Kwan Sung-sing, philosopher Hu Shih, Nobel laureate Yang Chen-Ning, electrical engineer Lee Yuk-wing, mathematician Chung Kai-lai, linguist Yuen Ren Chao, educator Kuo Ping-Wen, rocket scientist Qian Xuesen, meteorologist and scholar Chu Coching and architectural engineer Edward Y. Ying, who was influential in the planning of modern Shanghai. The scholarships served as a model for the Fulbright Program's grants for international educational exchange.

The remittance of excess payment and the establishment of the scholarship program also helped raise the international standing of the United States. In a letter to the Secretary of State John Hay, Liang Cheng, the Chinese minister to the United States wrote, "If your honorable country would take the lead [in returning excess indemnity payments], wherever the voice of righteousness spread, those countries would rise and follow it". As the leader of an emerging super power, Roosevelt recognized the remission of Boxer Indemnity as an chance for the U.S. to assume leadership position in the world. Roosevelt later claimed after the remission: "we have the right to hope that the return of these funds to China will stimulate European Powers to take action similar to that just suggested, and that generosity on our part will be met by similar unconditional remission by them". Roosevelt's act later yielded significant results. U.S's act of justice, friendship, and allowance greatly influenced other Powers:

Other governments, recognizing the beneficial effects of America's earlier action in this matter, are proposing to take a similar step. The Japanese Government has announced its decision to remit Japan's share of the indemnity. The French Government purposes to use its indemnity funds in the rehabilitation of a French bank in China. The British Government announced in December, 1922, that it would release its funds for purposes "mutually beneficial to Great Britain and to China..."

The remission of the Boxer Indemnity, as Roosevelt planned, helped the U.S. to not only dispel the embarrassment caused by the boycott, but also build its international image.

== See also ==
- Boxer Indemnity Scholarship recipients
