= Edward North =

Edward North may refer to:

- Edward North, 1st Baron North (1496–1564), English peer and politician
- Edward W. North (1778–1843), mayor of Charleston, South Carolina
- Edward North (classicist) (1820–1903), American classical scholar
- Edward North (Conservative politician) (1900–1942), British Conservative politician
