= Kuo Ping-Wen =

Chinese academic

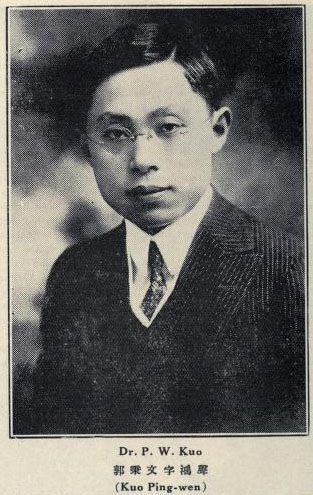
Kuo Ping-Wen

Kuo Ping-Wen or Guo Bingwen (Chinese: 郭秉文; 1880–1969), courtesy name Hongsheng (鴻聲), was an influential Chinese educator.

== Biography ==
Kuo was born in Shanghai, Jiangsu province, and his father was an elder in the Presbyterian Church. He attended Lowrie Institute (The Pure Heart Academy, Qingxin Shuyuan 清心書院), which was connected with the First Presbyterian Church in Shanghai (founded by John Marshall Willoughby Farnham, 1830–1917), graduating in 1896. Kuo Ping-wen then served in the customs and postal bureaus before coming to the United States in 1906 under the sponsorship of the Presbyterian Church. At first, he attended the Preparatory Academy at the University of Wooster, now the College of Wooster, in Ohio, and later, in 1908, he matriculated at the University of Wooster with the support of the Boxer Rebellion Indemnity Scholarship Program.

At Wooster, Kuo was one of the editors of the university newspaper, The Wooster Voice, and General Secretary of the Chinese Students Alliance. In 1911 he wrote an extensive article for the newspaper on the history of Chinese students in the United States, beginning with Yung Wing (Rong Hong) 容閎 at Yale University in the mid-nineteenth century. He won several speech prizes for the university and was mentored in oratory by Professor of Speech Delbert Lean. He graduated with honors from the University of Wooster in 1911 and then undertook graduate studies in Education under John Dewey and Paul Monroe at Columbia University, where he received his M.A. degree in 1912 and his Ph.D. in 1914. His doctoral dissertation, The Chinese System of Public Education, was published by the Teachers College at Columbia in 1915 and is a wide-ranging study of the history and structural development of education in China from ancient times onwards. The Chinese edition of the book was published in Shanghai in 1916.

In 1914 Kuo returned to China where he transformed the Nanjing Higher Normal School ( Nanjing Gaodeng Shifan Xuexiao 南京高等师范学校) into the first modern co-educational Chinese University, National Southeastern University (Guoli Dongnan Daxue 国立东南大学), which was later renamed National Central University (Guoli Zhongyang Daxue 国立中央大学) in 1928 and Nanjing University (Nanjing Daxue 南京大学) in 1949, and his ideas exerted a broad influence in Chinese educational circles. In 1921, he became the first chancellor of the Shanghai College of Commerce (Shanghai Shangke Daxue上海商科大学), which in 1917 had emerged from the program in commerce at Nanjing Higher Normal School. The Shanghai College of Commerce was the forerunner of the Shanghai University of Finance and Economics (SUFE) (Shanghai Caijing Daxue 上海财经大学). Kuo was the president of National Nanjing Higher Normal School from 1919-1923 and National Southeastern University from 1921-1925.

Kuo Ping-wen was elected three times as Vice-Chairman of the World Education Congress (Shijie Jiaoyuhui 世界教育會) and became the Chairman of its Asian division in 1923. His removal from his presidential post at National Southeastern University in 1925 was a result of the intrusion of political forces into higher education and academia during the turbulent decade of the 1920s in China. Essentially, Kuo had made compromises with the warlords during that decade in order to develop National Southeastern University, and the rise of the Kuomintang set him at odds with the Nationalist leadership. Later on in 1925, he came to the United States to lecture at the University of Chicago and was one of the founders of the China Institute in New York City, and also its director, 1926-1930. He married Ruth How, Xia Yu 夏瑜, on October 12, 1935 in Hangzhou. During the Second World War, Kuo was stationed in London with the Chinese Embassy and then returned to the United States as a member of the Chinese delegation associated with the early formation of the United Nations. He was instrumental in the Bretton Woods Conference of 1944 and served as the deputy director of the United Nations Relief Rehabilitation Administration. In the last decade of his life, he was President of the Sino-American Cultural Society in Washington, D.C., an organization he founded in 1958. Kuo Ping-wen is buried in Fort Lincoln Cemetery in Maryland.

== Legacy ==
In June 2011, the 100th anniversary of Kuo's graduation from the University of Wooster, and ninety years after Kuo was appointed as President of National Southeastern University, a conference examining Kuo's contribution to higher education in China was held in Nanjing at Southeast University, the site of former Southeastern University which Kuo had helped found. Scholars from the People's Republic of China, the Republic of China, and the United States were represented, and the participants presented papers dealing with Kuo's educational thought, his ideas on structuring higher education in China, and his impact on relations between East and West. On October 25, 2014, a symposium was held at Columbia University Teachers College dealing with Kuo's contributions to higher education in China and to Sino-Cultural institutions and affairs in the United States. Scholars from the People's Republic of China, the Republic of China and the United States contributed papers and participated in discussions on Kuo's career and its significance. In March, 2016, the book Kuo Ping Wen: Scholar, Reformer, Statesman, a collection of essays on Kuo as educator, statesman, and cultural ambassador, edited by Ryan Allen and Ji Liu, was published by Long River Press, and in October, 2016 a book-signing symposium was held at the C.V. Starr East Asian Library at Columbia University.

Since his academic background was shaped at liberal arts institutions, Kuo believed that a well-rounded education in both the sciences and the humanities was essential. Moreover, since his undergraduate experience at the University of Wooster was co-educational, he was a strong supporter of women's education in China. It was at the University of Wooster that Kuo changed his plan to study law and focused instead on issues of educational reform, which became the basis for his career once he returned to China. His educational philosophy embraced a strategy based on Four Balances: the balance between well-rounded education and specialized education, the balance between humanistic education and scientific education, the balance between investment in teaching faculty and investment in teaching facilities, and the balance between national and international learning. Kuo felt that China could learn much from the study of Western accomplishments in science, just as the West could learn much from China about the philosophy of life, and he was a strong supporter of the expansion of Chinese studies at American colleges and universities. In furthering interactions between East and West through education, Kuo Ping-wen contributed to building the Sino-American relationship that flourishes today.
