= Tsai Tingkan =

Republican China politician

- 蔡廷幹
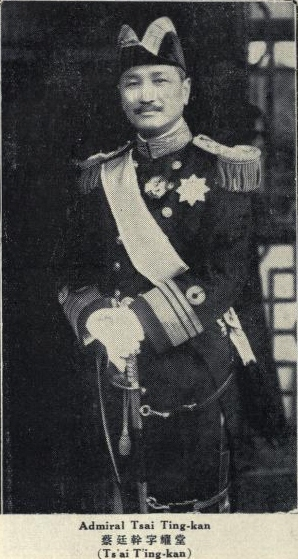

Personal details
- Born: 5 April 1861 Xiangshan County, Guangdong, Qing Dynasty
- Died: 24 September 1935 (aged 74) Peiping, Republic of China
Tsai Tingkan
- Traditional Chinese: 蔡廷幹
- Simplified Chinese: 蔡廷干
Transcriptions
Standard Mandarin
- Hanyu Pinyin: Cài Tínggàn
- Wade–Giles: Ts'ai^{4} Ting^{2}-kan^{4}
Yue: Cantonese
- Jyutping: Coi^{3} Ting^{4}-Gon^{3}

Tsai Ting Kan, (Chinese: 蔡廷幹; pinyin: Cài Tínggàn; 1861 - 1935) was a Chinese naval officer. Tsai was educated in the United States as a student on the Chinese Educational Mission and became an admiral in the Qing dynasty navy and Republican era statesman and politician.

== Education in the United States and early naval career ==
In 1873 Tsai was sent to America to study as a member of the Chinese Educational Mission (CEM) and lived with an American family in New Britain, Connecticut. After graduating from high school, where he was known as "Fighting Chinee," he behaved so wildly that it was decided to send him back to China. But when Yung Wing, the CEM leader, interviewed him, he saw that Tsai had learned excellent colloquial American English and instead sent Tsai to learn practical mechanics in a machine shop at Lowell, Massachusetts. Since the machinery in the shop was dangerous, Tsai and his CEM fellow student were given permission to cut the long queues which the government of China required all Chinese men to wear, the only time that such an act was officially condoned.

When the CEM students were returned to China in 1881, Tsai entered the navy to study torpedo management and torpedo boats, as well as electrical engineering, mining, and surveying. He was commissioned at the age of 27, and rose to the rank of commander. During the first Battle of the Yellow Sea, in Sino-Japanese War, September 1894, he commanded a torpedo boat in the Dagu Fort defenses. After the initial defeat, Tsai's ship was part of the fleet which took up an offshore position to defend Weihaiwei, on the Shandong peninsula. But in January 1895, the Japanese Army captured a strategic position on the mainland which endangered the Chinese force. The Admiral of the Chinese fleet determined to surrender, but Tsai was among the officers who defied his orders and attempted to break out. Tsai's ship was sunk, and he was wounded and captured. After the war he was released, but in the recriminations over China's humiliating defeat, his rank was taken away.

In 1901, following China's further defeat in the Boxer Uprising, on the recommendation of Tang Shaoyi, a fellow CEM student, Tsai was taken into the service of Yuan Shikai, the military reformer and political general, who sponsored his rehabilitation and rise. In 1911 he was promoted to rear admiral and in the following year, Chief of the Department of Naval Administration in Navy Board

== Political career under the Republic ==
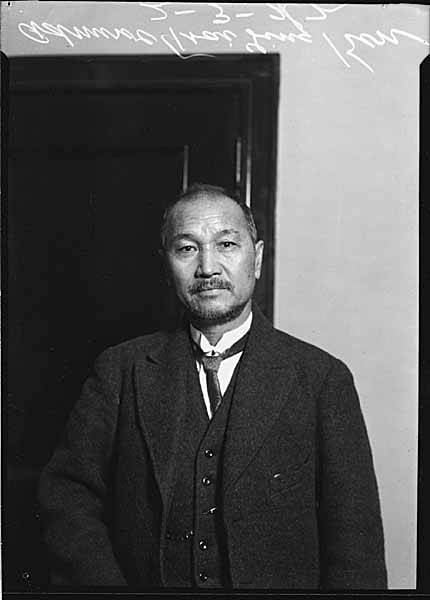
In civilian dress in Seattle, Washington, U.S., 1922.

Under the new republic, Tsai helped Yuan Shikai negotiate the abdication of the Manchu ruler. When Yuan became president, he took pride in the foreign educated returned students he placed in prominent positions, and Ts’ai was one of several graduates of the CEM to join his entourage. Tsai served as the Associate Director-General of Customs Revenue Council, inspector in the Salt Gabelle, in the Department of Taxation, and as Master of Ceremonies in the presidential palace. Tsai was Yuan's English language interpreter and guided his conduct of foreign affairs. In 1915, for instance, he exchanged notes with British representatives about the conditions under which China could enter the war in Europe. When Yuan's ambitions began to alienate public opinion, Tsai was one of the few foreign educated members of Yuan's entourage to stay with him until the end. Tsai went into retirement when Yuan died in 1916 only to be taken back into government by Duan Qirui, leader of the Northern government in Peking. In 1917 he served as Chairman of the Tariff Revision Commission. In 1921, he served as advisor to the Chinese delegation to the Washington Conference. Among the ceremonial services he provided was to preside over the marriage of Henry Puyi, the last emperor. In 1925, his favorable reputation in both the Chinese and foreign communities made him acceptable to serve on the commission on the May Thirtieth Incident in which Shanghai police fired upon and killed Chinese protestors.

In July 1926, Premier W. W. Yen appointed him Foreign Minister but Tsai resigned in October. In 1927 he resigned as Director-General of Customs Revenue Council and retired to private life. In 1931 he settled Peking as professor of Chinese literature at Tsinghua University and Peking University. In 1932, he published Chinese Poems in English Rhyme 唐詩英韻 (University of Chicago Press). He died in Peking on September 24, 1935, at the age of 75.
