= Kelly & Walsh =

Shanghai-based publisher founded in 1876

Logo of Kelly & Walsh.

Kelly & Walsh was a notable Shanghai-based publisher of English language books, founded in 1876, which currently exists as a small chain of shops in Hong Kong specializing in art books.

Kelly & Walsh Ltd. was formed in 1876 by combining two Shanghai booksellers: Kelly and Co. and F. & C. Walsh. It was incorporated on July 1, 1885 and most active from the 1880s through the 1930s, with publications from cities including Hong Kong, Singapore, Tokyo, and Yokohama. It moved to Hong Kong following the occupation of China by the Japanese, and was ultimately sold to book seller Swindon Book Co. Ltd. in Hong Kong.

The Singapore branch of Kelly & Walsh operated a bookshop from the 1880s until 1956 and also published "200 recorded titles" between 1887 and the mid-1950s. It also set up its own printing and bookbinding department in 1899.

== Selected publications ==
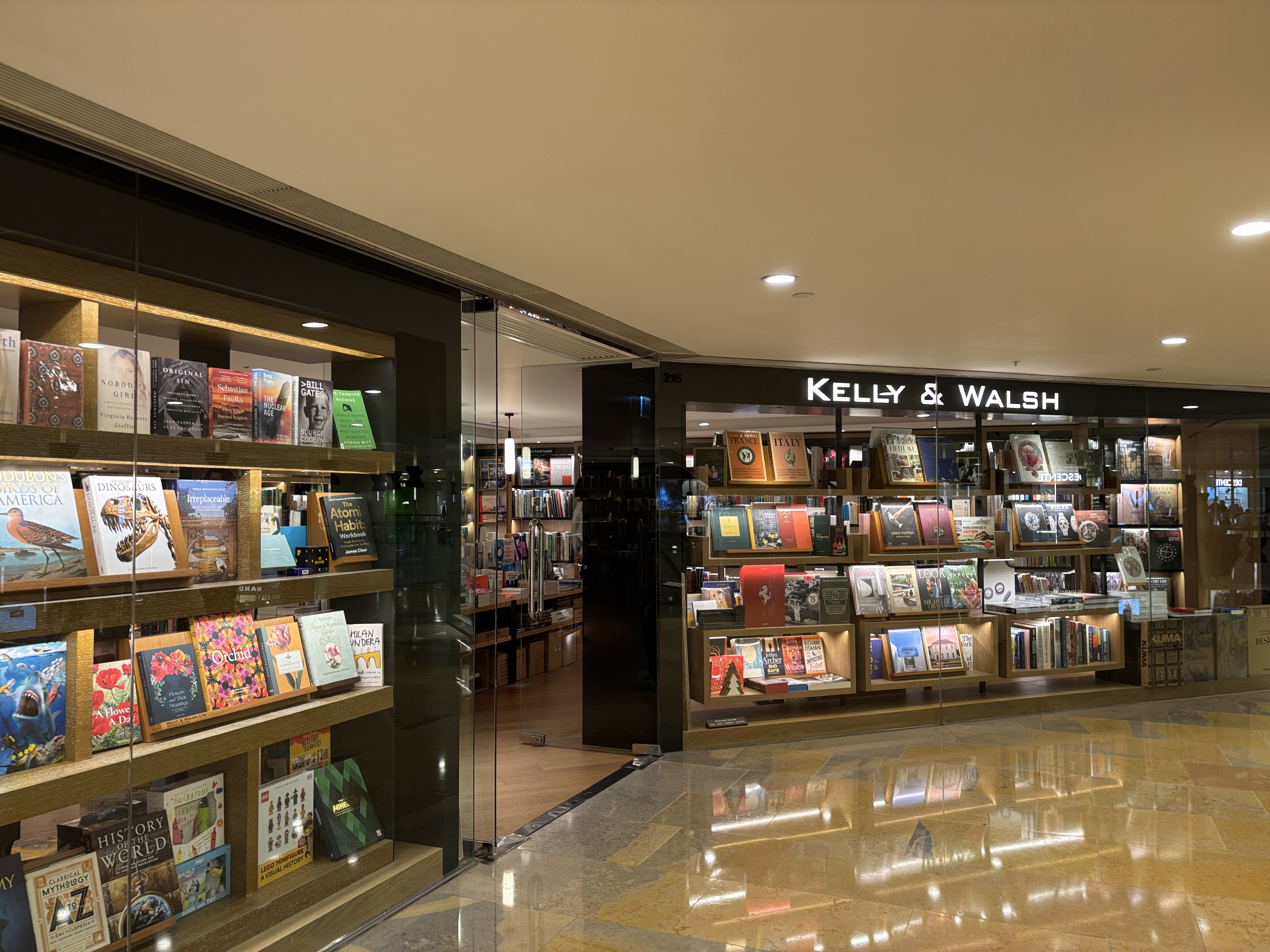
The Kelly & Walsh bookshop in the Pacific Place mall in Hong Kong

- Ball, J. Dyer
  - Things Chinese: Being Notes on Various Subjects Connected with China, Hong Kong, 1892.
  - The Cantonese Made Easy Vocabulary, a Small Dictionary in English and Cantonese, Hong Kong, 1906.
  - The Celestial and His Religions, Or, the Religious Aspect in China; Being a Series of Lectures on the Religions of the Chinese, Hong Kong, 1906.
  - Five Thousand Years of John Chinaman, Hong Kong, 1906.
  - Rhythms and Rhymes in Chinese Climes: A Lecture on Chinese Poetry and Poets, 1907.
- Balet, Jean Cyprien, Le Japon militaire : l'armée et la marine japonaises en 1910-1911, Yokohama, 1911.
- Bredon, Juliet
  - Peking: A Historical and Intimate Description of its Chief Places of Interest..., Shanghai, 1922, 2nd edition, revised and enlarged.
  - The Moon Year - A Record of Chinese Festivals and Customs, Shanghai, 1927
  - Sir Robert Hart, Shanghai, 1927
  - Chinese New Year Festivals, Shanghai, 1930
  - Hundred Altars, Shanghai, 1934
- Couling, Samuel, The Encyclopedia Sinica, Shanghai, 1917.
- D'Auxion de Ruffe, Reginald, Is China Mad?, 1928.
- De Havilland, Walter, The ABC of Go: The National War Game of Japan, Yokohama, 1910.
- Eitel, Ernest J., Europe in China: The History of Hongkong from the Beginning to the Year 1882 London: Luzac & Co.; Hong Kong, Kelly & Walsh, 1873.
- Fa-Hsien, Record of the Buddhistic Kingdoms, Translated from the Chinese by H. A. Giles, Shanghai, c. 1877. Co-published by Trübner & Co., London.
- Giles, Herbert A.
  - A Chinese Biographical Dictionary, Shanghai, 1898. Jointly published with Quaritch, London.
  - Chinese Without a Teacher, being a Collection of Easy and Useful Sentences in the Mandarin Dialect, with a Vocabulary, Shanghai, 1887.
  - A Glossary of Reference on Subjects Connected with the Far East, 1878.
  - 古今姓氏族譜 [Gujin Xingshi Zupu] A Chinese Biographical Dictionary, 1898.
- Hirth, F., China and the Roman Orient: Researches Into Their Ancient and Mediæval Relations as Represented in Old Chinese Records, Hong Kong and Shanghai, 1895. Jointly published with Georg Hirth, Leipzig and Munich.
- Hosie, Sir Alexander, Szechwan: Its Products, Industries and Resources, Shanghai, 1922.
- Lai, T. C., Magic Mountains: The Art of Yu Chengyao, Hong Kong, 1987.
- McHugh, J.N., A Handbook of Spoken "Bazaar" Malay, Singapore, 1953, 5th edition.
- Martin, W. A. P.
  - Hanlin Papers or Essays on the Intellectual Life of the Chinese, Shanghai, 1894.
  - Chinese Legends and Lyrics, Hong Kong, Singapore and Yokohama, 1912.
- Mollendorff, Paul Georg von
  - Manual of Chinese Bibliography, Being a List of Works and Essays Relating to China, Shanghai: 1876. Co-published with Trübner & Co., London. Joint author: Otto Franz von Möllendorff.
  - The Family Law in Chinese, Shanghai, 1896.
  - Praktische Anleitung zur Erlernung der hochchinesischen Sprache, 4th ed., Shanghai, 1906.
- Plant, Cornell, Glimpses of the Yangtze Gorges, Shanghai, 1921.
- Pott, Francis Lister Hawks, A Sketch of Chinese History, Shanghai, 1903, 1915.
- Stephenson, Edward S. and W. Asano, Famous People of Japan (Ancient and Modern), Yokohama 1911.
- Wei Yuan, Chinese Account of the Opium War, 1888. Edited and translated by E. H. Parker.
- Wen Yuan-ning, Imperfect Understandings, 1935.
- White, William Charles, Tombs of Old Lo-Yang, A Record of the Construction and Contents of a Group of Royal Tombs at Chin-t'sun, Honan, Probably Dating 550 B.C., 1934.

== Book series ==
- China Coast Tales
- Hanlin Papers
- The Pagoda Library
