= James Dyer Ball =

James Dyer Ball (波乃耶) (4 December 1847 in Canton, China – 22 February 1919 in London, England) was a Hong Kong scholar and author born in Canton. He is noted for his works on Chinese culture and for contributing to the development of the system of Cantonese Romanisation.

== Early life ==
Ball was the son of the Reverend Dyer Ball of Massachusetts, United States, and his much younger second wife, Scottish missionary Isabella Robertson. Apart from preaching, his father ran a dispensary and opened a school in Canton, Guangzhou. At age 7, Ball's family began three years of travel in Britain and the United States, returning to Canton in November 1858 where he received his secondary education before going on to King's College, London, and University College, Liverpool.

== Hong Kong career ==
Ball began his career in Hong Kong with a brief stint as a school teacher at the Government Central School. In March 1875, he took up the post of assistant Chinese interpreter and clerk at the Magistrates' Courts. Six years later, he had risen to First Interpreter at the Supreme Court, Sheriff and Marshall of the Vice-Admiralty Court. He retired in 1909 and died in 1919 in Enfield, Middlesex, England

== Writing ==
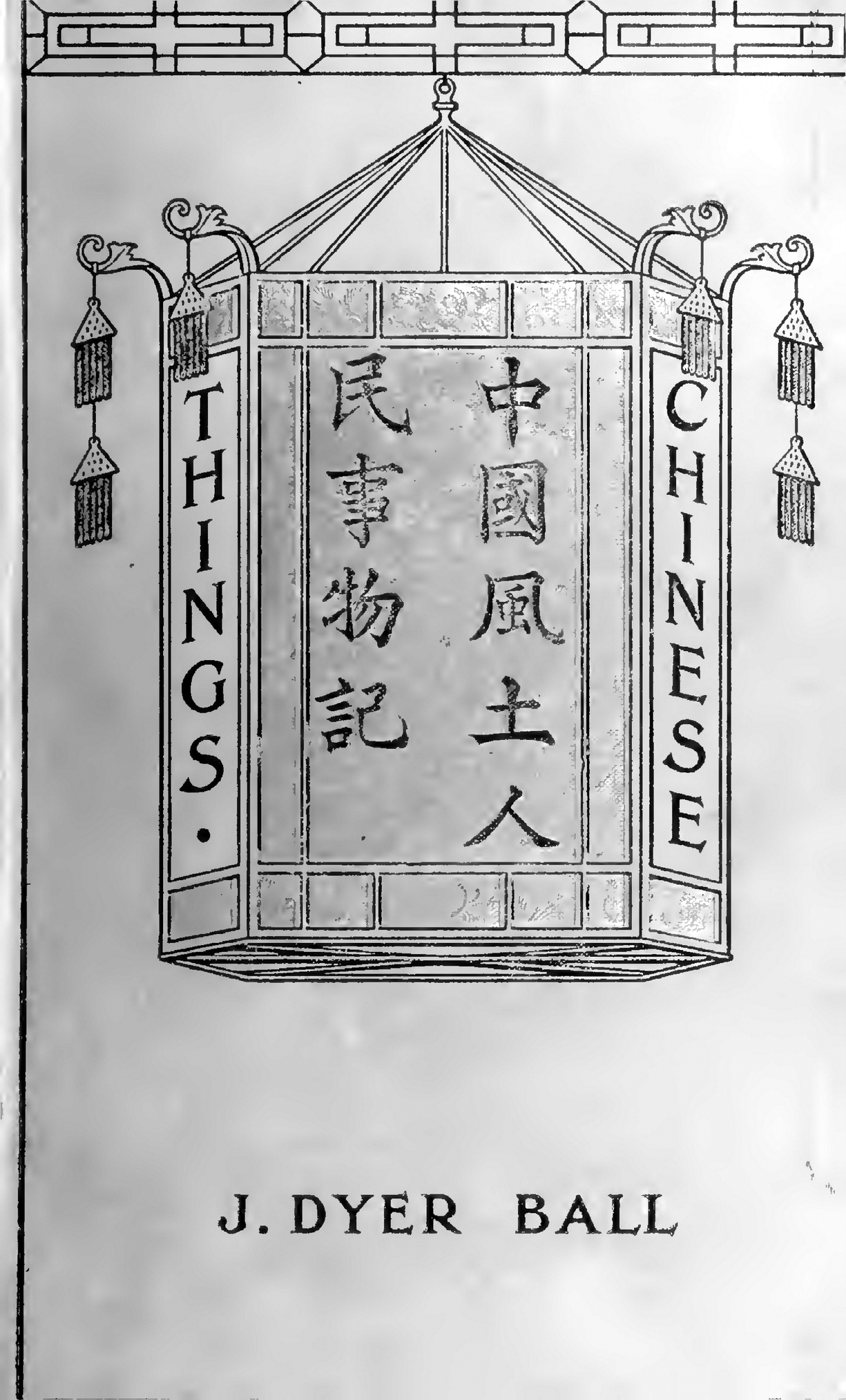

Ball was considered the most capable and knowledgeable European speaker of Cantonese of his time.

Mr Ball is one of the most accomplished linguists in Hongkong ... and no more able pen could be found for the work of simplifying and popularizing the Chinese tongue.

=== Publications ===
Ball authored many pamphlets and books, including

- Easy Sentences in the Hakka Dialect, with a Vocabulary, China Mail, 1881
- Cantonese Made Easy: A Book of Simple Sentences in the Cantonese Dialect, with Free and Literal Translations, and Directions for the Rendering of English Grammatical Forms in Chinese, Hong Kong: Kelly & Walsh, 1888.
- How to write Chinese : containing general rules for writing Chinese, and particular directions for writing the radicals (1905)
- An English-Cantonese Pocket Vocabulary, Containing Common Words and Phrases (1888)
- How to Speak Cantonese (1889)
- The Tung-Kwún Dialect: A Comparative Syllabary of the Tung-Kwún and Cantonese Pronunciations, with Observations of the Variations in the Use of the Classifiers, Finals, and Other Words, and a Description of the Tones (1890)
- Fernside (1890)
- The San-Wúí Dialect (1890)
- The English-Chinese Cookery Book, Containing 200 Receipts in English and Chinese, Hong Kong: Kelly & Walsh, 1891
- Cantonese Made Easy (1892)
- Things Chinese: Being Notes on Various Subjects Connected with China, London: Sampson Low, Marston and Company, and Hong Kong: Kelly & Walsh, 1892
- Readings in Cantonese Colloquial: Being Selections from Books in the Cantonese Vernacular with Free and Literal Translations of the Chinese Character and Romanized Spelling, Kelly & Walsh, 1894.
- Easy Sentences in the Hakka: With a Vocabulary (Kelly & Walsh, 1896)
- The Höng Shán Or Macao Dialect: A Comparative Syllabary of the Höng Shán and Cantonese Pronunciations, with Observations on the Variations in the Use of the Classifiers, Finals and Other Words, and a Description of the Tones (1897)
- The Shun-Tak Dialect (1901)
- How to Speak Cantonese: Fifty Conversations in Cantonese Colloquial, with the Chinese Character, Free and Literal English Translations, and Romanised Spelling with Tonic and Diacritical Marks, etc.. Hong Kong, Kelly & Walsh, 1902.
- Bondfield, G H; Ball, J Dyer (1903). A History of Union Church.
- Things Chinese; or, Notes connected with China, Charles Scribner's Sons, 1904. Fourth edition, revised and enlarged.
- How to Write Chinese, Containing General Rules for Writing the Language with Particular Directions for Writing the Radicals, Hong Kong: Kelly & Walsh, 1905
- — (1905). Macao, the Holy City: The Gem of the Orient Earth. China Baptist Publication Society.
- — (1905). The Pith of the Classics: The Chinese Classics in Everyday Life; or, lessons from the Chinese classics in colloquial use. Hong Kong.
- — (1906). Five Thousand Years of John Chinaman. Hong Kong: Kelly & Walsh.
- — (1906). The Celestial and His Religions, Or, the Religious Aspect in China; Being a Series of Lectures on the Religions of the Chinese. Hong Kong: Kelly & Walsh.
- — (1907). Rhythms and Rhymes in Chinese Climes: A Lecture on Chinese Poetry and Poets. Hong Kong: Kelly & Walsh.
- Is Buddhism a Preparation Or a Hindrance to Christianity in China? (1907)
- — (1908). The Cantonese Made Easy Vocabulary, a Small Dictionary in English and Cantonese. Hong Kong: Kelly & Walsh.
- — (1911). The Chinese at home, or the man of Tong and his land. New York: Fleming H Revell & Co.
- — (1912). Early Russian Intercourse with China. London: Anglo-Russian Literary Society.
- Papers on China
