= Chinese Educational Mission =

Qing dynasty program

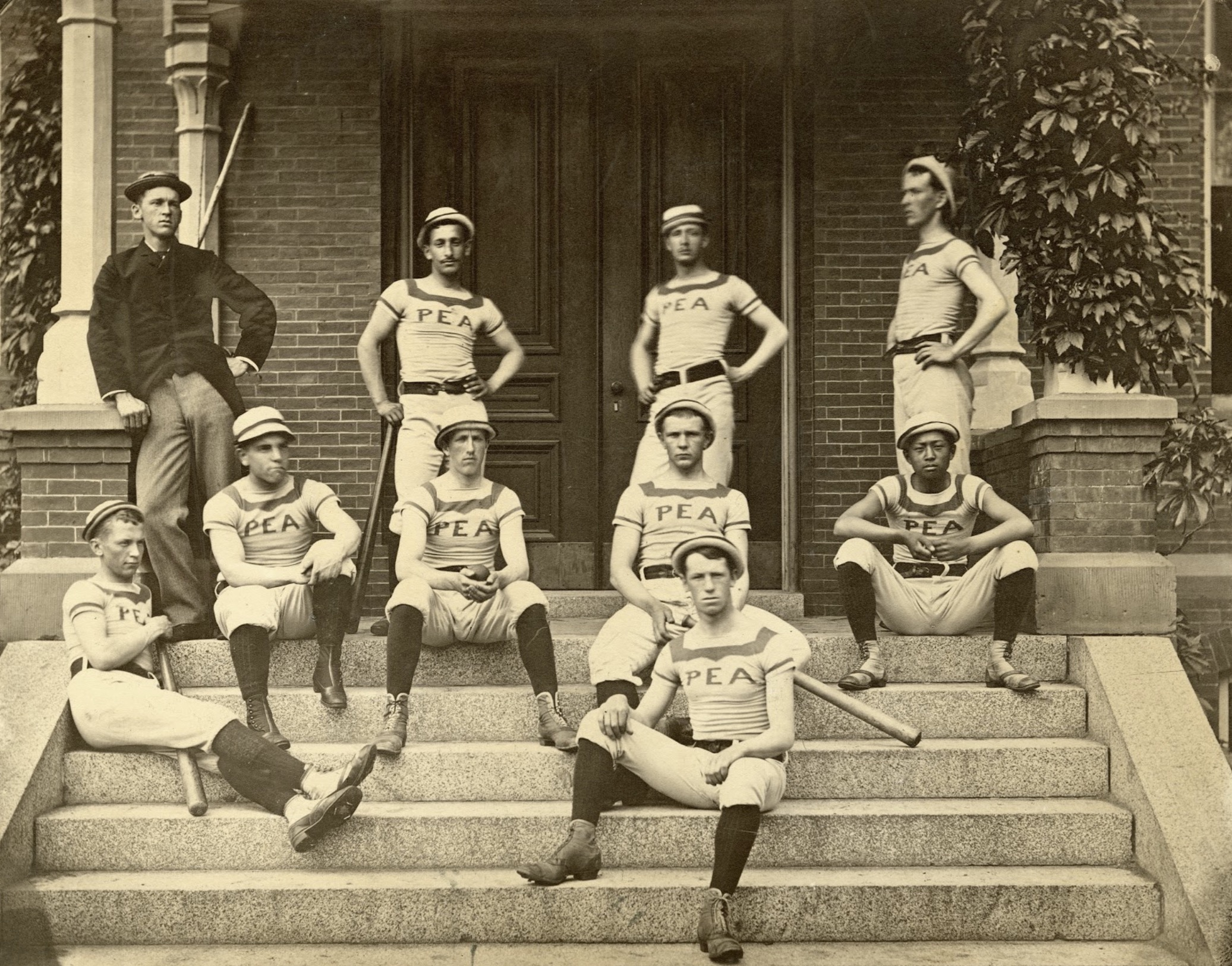
A student from the Chinese Educational Mission (2nd row, 1st from right) on the baseball team at Phillips Exeter Academy

Yung Wing and the Chinese College at Hartford, Connecticut

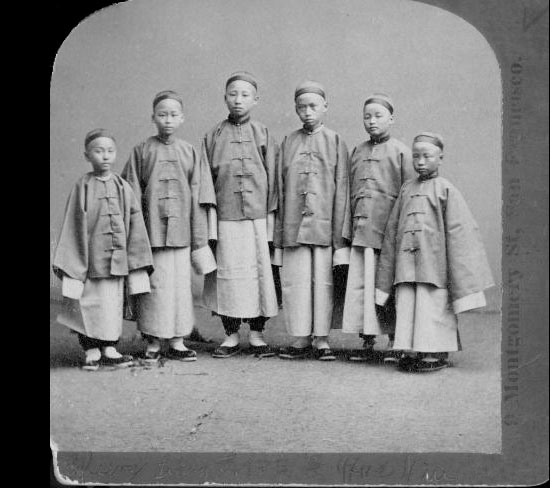
Six First Detachment students on arrival in California

The Chinese Educational Mission (1872–1881) was a pioneering attempt by reform-minded officials of the Qing dynasty to help modernize China through the education of 120 Chinese students in the United States.

== History ==
The 1868 Burlingame Treaty between China and the United States included a provision that granted Chinese in the United States the same rights as other foreigners. This allowed Chinese to enroll in American schools and universities, thus facilitating China's first central-government sponsored study abroad program, the Chinese Educational Mission.

In 1871, Yung Wing, the first Chinese to graduate from an American university (Yale, class of 1854), persuaded the Chinese government to send supervised groups of young Chinese boys to the United States to study Western science and engineering. The stated intent behind the initiative was to contribute to China's modernization and "Self-Strengthening" efforts at a time when China had become severely weakened by foreign imperialism and internal conflicts.

With the government's approval, Yung Wing became Commissioner of the Chinese Educational Mission, under which 120 boys, some under the age of ten, were selected to study in the New England region of the United States beginning in 1872. The mission based its headquarters in Hartford, Connecticut, partly on account of Yung Wing's friendship with the Rev. Joseph H. Twichell, a supporter of the mission and a close friend of Mark Twain.

The students arrived in four detachments (1872, 1873, 1874 and 1875). Placed with American host families in Hartford and other New England towns, they were enrolled in select schools in preparation for subsequent studies in college. These schools included Williston Seminary, Phillips Academy Andover, Phillips Academy Exeter, Hartford Public High School, Holyoke High School, and Somerville High School.

After graduating from secondary school, the boys would go on to study at various universities, including Yale, MIT and Columbia University.

A decade into the mission, however, internal disagreements between Yung Wing and senior Qing officials over how the boys' activities and conduct should be managed intensified to the point where the future of the mission itself was called into question.

Furthermore, external pressures such as rising anti-Chinese sentiment in the US (which led to the passing of the Chinese Exclusion Act in 1882) and the US government's refusal in 1878 to allow Chinese students into the Military Academy at West Point and the Naval Academy at Annapolis, in contravention of the Burlingame Treaty, antagonized diplomatic relations between the US and China.

When the fourth and final Commissioner Wu Jiashan arrived from China in 1879, he found that the students had become too Americanized and felt they were neglecting their Chinese heritage and becoming "denationalized".

The influential official Huang Zunxian wrote a poem which admitted that the students had lived luxurious lives and become Americanized, but lamented the lost opportunity:

Unfortunately, in the Imperial Academy
The curriculum has not included Western learning.
Withal, on the promotion of science
Now depends the future of the nation.
A decade's effort in training youths
Will lay the foundation for a century's wealth and strength.

Despite a spirited campaign to save the mission, including an overture to Ulysses Grant by Mark Twain, the Qing government terminated the mission in June 1881, ordering all students to return to China. At the time of the announcement, 43 students, including 20 at Yale, were enrolled in college and had to abandon their studies.

Of the mission's original 120 students, about 100 returned to China.

Many of the students who returned went on to make significant contributions to their country in government, industry, engineering, and the sciences. They included Liang Cheng, Tang Shaoyi, Hong Yen Chang, Cai Tinggan, Zhan Tianyou and Shouson Chow.

Among the students who attended Natchaug School in Willimantic, Connecticut and MIT was Sung Mun Wai (宋文翙), who later became a Vice Admiral in the Chinese Navy.

== List of students ==
Note: The following names are in each person's own way of transcription used during their studies in USA instead of pinyin.

Group	Names
First (1872)	Chang Hong Yen 張康仁; Chin Mon Fay 錢文魁; Ching Ta Hee 程大器; Chun Kee Young 陳鉅鏞; Chun Wing Kwai 陳榮貴; Chung Ching Shing 鍾俊成; Chung Mun Yew 鍾文耀; Ho Ting Liang 何廷梁; Jeme Tien Yow 詹天佑; Kwong Young Kong 鄺榮光; Liang Tun Yen 梁敦彥; Liu Chia Chew 劉家照; Low Kwok Sui 羅國瑞; Luk Wing Chuan 陸永泉; New Shan Chow 牛尚周; Ouyang King 歐陽庚; Paun Min Chung 潘銘鐘; Shih Kin Tong 石錦堂; Sze Kin Yung 史錦鏞; Tan Yew Fun 譚耀勳; Ting Sze Chung 鄧士聰; Tsai Cum Shang 蔡錦章; Tsai Shou Kee 蔡紹基; Tseng Tuh Kun 曾篤恭; Tso Ki Foo 曹吉福; Wong Chung Liang 黃仲良; Wong Kai Kah 黃開甲; Wong Sic Pao 黃錫寶; Woo Yang Tsang 吳仰曾; Young Shang Him 容尚謙
Second (1873)	Chang Hsiang Woo 張祥和; Chang Yau Kung 張有恭; Chuck Yen Chi 卓仁志; Chun Kin Sing 陳乾生; Chun Pay Hu 陳佩瑚; Fong Pah Liang 方伯樑; Kwong King Huan 鄺景垣; Kwong Wing Chung 鄺詠鐘; Lee Kwai Pan 李桂攀; Lee Yen Fu 李恩富; Liang Kin Wing 梁金榮; Liang Pao Chew 梁普照; Liang Pao Shi 梁普時; Lok Sik Kwai 陸錫貴; Sue Yi Chew 蘇銳釗; Sung Mon Wai 宋文翽; Ting Kwai Ting 鄧桂庭; Ting Sung Kih 丁崇吉; Tong Kwo On 唐國安; Tong Yuen Chan 唐元湛; Tsai Ting Kan 蔡廷幹; Tseng Poo 曾溥; Won Bing Chung 溫秉忠; Wong Fung Kai 王鳳喈; Wong Liang Ting 王良登; Wong Yau Chang 黃有章; Woo Chung Yen 吳仲賢; Woo Ying Fo 吳應科; Yung Kwai 容揆; Yung Shang Kun 容尚勤
Third (1874)	Ching Ta Yeh 程大業; Chow Chang Ling 周長齡; Chow Wan Pung 周萬鵬; Chu Chi Shuan 徐之煊; Chu Chun Pan 徐振鵬; Chu Pao Fay 朱寶奎; Chu Sik Shao 朱錫綬; Jang Ting Shan 鄭廷襄; Kee Tsu Yi 祁祖彝; Kong Kin Ling 康賡齡; Kwong King Yang 鄺景揚; Kwong Yen Chow 鄺賢儔; Liang Yu Ho 梁如浩; Lin Pay Chuan 林沛泉; Loo Ssu Wha 盧祖華; Shen Ke Shu 沈嘉樹; Sit Yau Fu 薛有福; Sun Kwong Ming 孫廣明; Tong Chi Yao 唐致堯; Tong Shao Yi 唐紹儀; Tsao Ka Chuck 曹嘉爵; Tsao Ka Hsiang 曹嘉祥; Tsao Mao Hsang 曹茂祥; Won Wai Shing 宦維城; Wong Kwei Liang 黃季良; Woo King Yung 吳敬榮; Yang Chan Ling 楊昌齡; Yang Sew Nan 楊兆南; Young Yew Huan 容耀垣; Yuen Chan Kwon 袁長坤
Fourth (1875)	Chen Fu Tseng 陳福增; Chin Kin Kwai 陳金揆; Chow Chuen Ao 周傳諤; Chow Chuen Kan 周傳諫; Chun Shao Chang 陳紹昌; Fung Bing Chung 馮炳鐘; Kin Ta Ting 金大廷; Kwong Kwok Kong 鄺國光; Kwong Pin Kong 鄺炳光; Lee Yu Kin 李汝金; Liang Ao Ting 梁鼇登; Liang Pi Yuk 梁丕旭; Lin Yuen Fai 林聯輝; Lin Yuen Shing 林聯盛; Liu Yulin 劉玉麟; Lok Teh Chang陸德彰; Paun Sze Chi 潘斯熾; Shen Mou Yang 盛文揚; Shen Shao Chang 沈壽昌; Shen Teh Fai 沈德輝; Shen Teh Yew 沈德耀; Tan Yew Fong 譚耀芳; Tao Ting King 陶廷賡; Tong Wing Chun 唐榮俊; Tong Wing Ho 唐榮浩; Wong Chu Lin 黃祖蓮; Wong Yen Bin 王仁彬; Wong Yew Chong 黃耀昌; Woo Huan Yung 吳煥榮; Woo Kee Tsao 吳其藻

== See also ==
- Chen Lanbin
- Zeng Laishun
