= Boxer Indemnities =

Payments by China to foreign powers after Boxer Rebellion

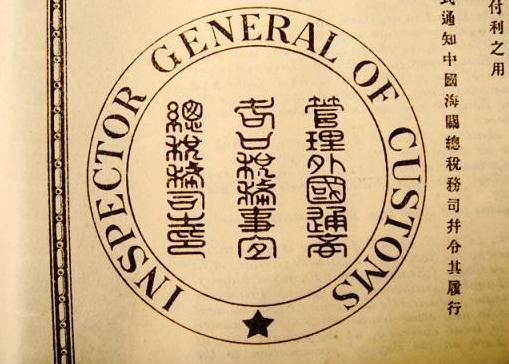
Bond for Boxer Rebellion Indemnity

The Boxer Indemnities (simplified Chinese: 庚子赔款; traditional Chinese: 庚子賠款; pinyin: Gēngzǐ Péikuǎn) were payments required by the Qing dynasty to foreign powers following its defeat in the Boxer Rebellion and the 9 September 1901 Boxer Protocol which concluded it. In addition to the formal indemnities required through the Boxer Protocol, local and provincial Qing governments also paid indemnities to various private claimants, particularly foreign missionaries and churches.

== Reasons of the compensation ==
During the Boxer War, Eight-Nation Alliance forces captured Beijing and dispersed across Zhili and Shanxi both to suppress the Boxer movement and engage in a punishment campaign of Chinese, regardless of whether their targets had been involved in the movement or not. The punitive campaign covered the period of mid-August 1900 through April 1901, while negotiations to end the war proceeded.

On 7 September 1901, the Boxer Protocol was signed. Along with requiring the Qing to pay an indemnity, it required destruction of the Taku Forts, and a two-year ban on importing arms into the country.

The reasons of the western countries for the compensation payments from the Qing are:

1. Dispatch of combat troops to Qing Empire, cost of money and interest;
2. Compensation for the loss of citizens, missionaries, merchants and businesses;
3. Compensation for the loss of national churches;
4. Compensation for the loss of Chinese Christians.

== Amount of indemnities ==
1. Russian Empire (29.0%)
2. German Empire (20.0%)
3. French Third Republic (15.8%)
4. British Empire (11.2%)
5. Empire of Japan (7.73%)
6. United States (7.32%)
7. Kingdom of Italy (5.91%)
8. Belgium (1.89%)
9. Austria-Hungary (0.89%)
10. Kingdom of the Netherlands (0.17%)
11. Other (0.10%)

Repair payments have been defined: 450,000,000 tael fine silver (approx. 67,5 million British pounds; Three hundred million US$ dollars) plus 4% annual interest. Over 39 years, these were total 982,238,150 tablets (approx. 34.683 tons of silver) for the loss that China had caused to the Eight Nations Alliance. The compensation payments were distributed as follows:

1. Russian Empire 28.97%
2. German Empire 20.02%
3. French Third Republic 15.75%
4. British Empire 11.25%
5. Empire of Japan 7.73%
6. United States 7.32%
7. Kingdom of Italy 5.91%
8. Belgium 1.89%
9. Austria-Hungary 0.89%
10. Kingdom of the Netherlands 0.17%
11. Spain 0.030%
12. Kingdom of Portugal 0.020%
13. Union between Sweden and Norway 0.010%

In addition to the formal indemnities required by the Boxer protocol, local and provincial governments were also required to pay indemnities to various private claimants (particularly foreign missionaries and churches) for damages resulting from the Boxer Rebellion. Because the Qing raised the money for the indemnities from taxes, the people of China resented having to fund the indemnities required by the foreign powers. Some of these private indemnities went to Chinese Christian priests or Chinese Christian families, but private indemnities often did not fund those in the local community, further increasing public discontent.

== History ==
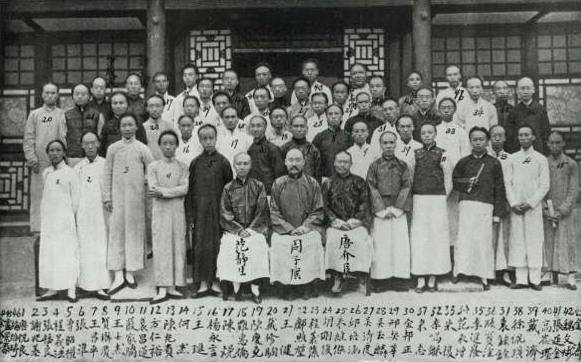
Photo of the first group Boxer Indemnity students studying in the United States in 1909

As the United States had demanded less compensation than was then stipulated in the Boxer Rebellion, they converted the overcompensation received into a scholarship for Chinese students, which known as the Boxer Rebellion Indemnity Scholarship Program. Subsequently, The Empire of Japan and French Third Republic also used part of the compensation for young Chinese students to finance their studies.

After the First World War, the Republic of China's claims against defeated German Empire and Austria-Hungary were counterbalanced. After the October Revolution, the Soviet government granted an indemnity waiver in the 1920s regarding the Boxer Indemnities.

When China's compensation payments for the Boxer Indemnities ended in 1938, the actual compensation amount amounted to more than six hundred million silver dollars, converted to around one billion yuan.
