= Dyer Ball =

American missionary

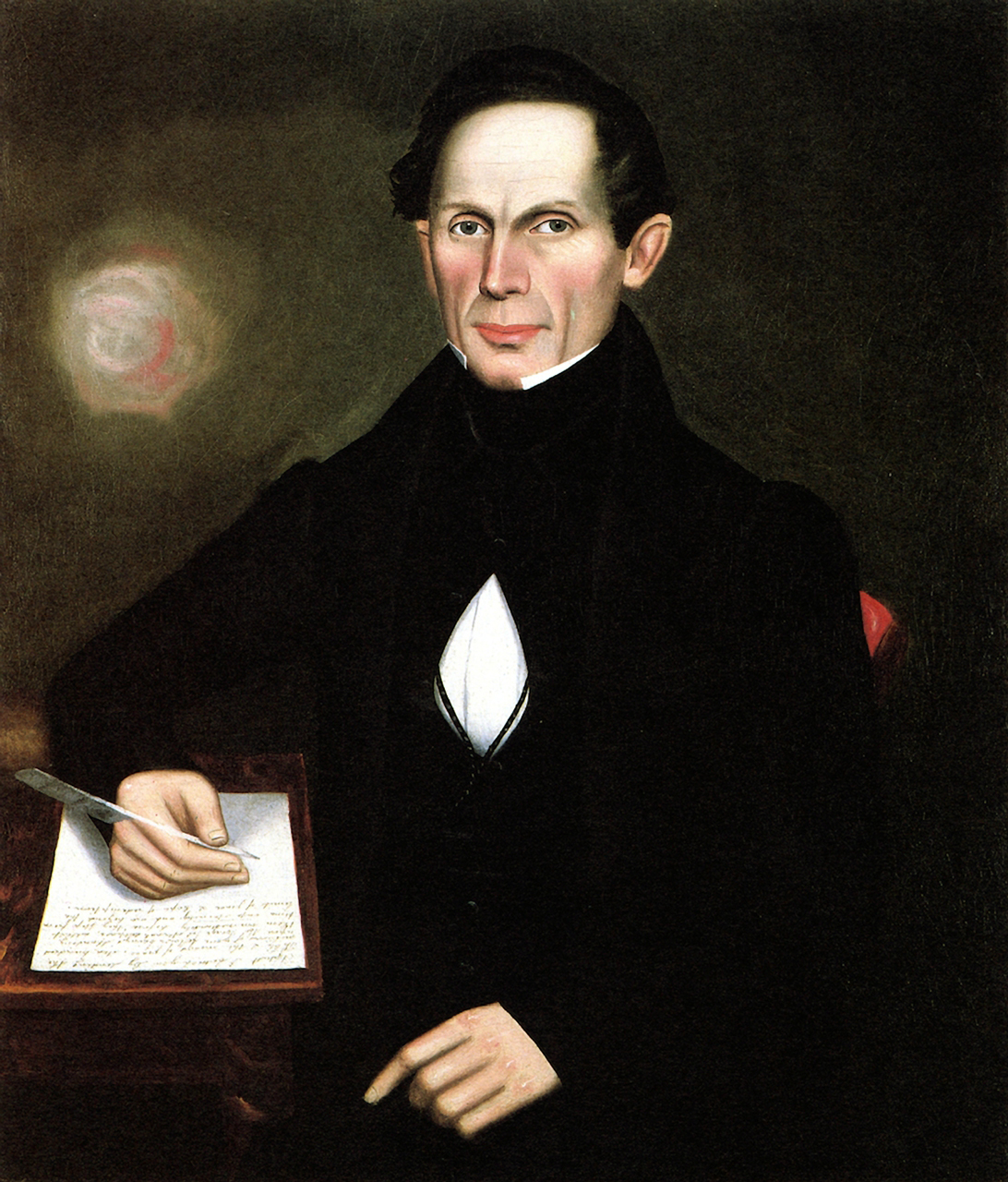
Portrait of Dyer Ball by Erastus Salisbury Field

Dyer Ball (June 3, 1796 – March 27, 1866) was an American missionary and medical doctor in China.

== Life ==
Born in West Boylston, Massachusetts, Dyer Ball studied at Phillips Academy and at Yale College for two years. He graduated from Union College, New York, in 1826, and then studied Theology at Yale and Andover Theological Seminary. In 1827 he married Lucy Mills. After being ordained in 1831, Dyer Ball became an agent of the American Home Missionary Society in 1833, and settled in Florida, where he taught, among other places, at St. Augustine High School there, and among the local African-American community. Meanwhile, as his appointment to a mission abroad was delayed due to financial circumstances, he also received a medical degree from a medical institution in Charleston, South Carolina, in 1837, and learned Chinese.

He was sent to Singapore by the American Board of Commissioners for Foreign Missions on 25 May 1838, and remained there until 1841, when he departed for Macao due to his wife's ailing health. He then moved to Hong Kong in 1843, where his wife died. He and Rev Elijah Coleman Bridgman then moved to Guangdong (Canton Province) in 1845, where he settled permanently. In 1846, he married Isabella Robertson, a missionary from Scotland.

His work focused mainly on performing missionary work and preaching. He ran a boys' school and opened a publishing house, where he published Chinese literature, religious tracts and a popular Chinese almanac. He also used his medical experience to help the local population.

Dyer Ball died in Guangdong in 1866. He is buried at the Mission Cemetery in Lianzhou.

== Family ==
He married Lucy Mills in 1828. She died in 1844.

In 1846, he married Isabella Robertson, a missionary from Scotland.

He had two children. His daughter from his first marriage, Elizabeth, became a missionary and married Andrew P. Happer in 1847. His son from his second marriage, James Dyer Ball, became Deputy Registrar of the Supreme Court in Hong Kong.
