= Kuang Sunmou =

Chinese railway engineer

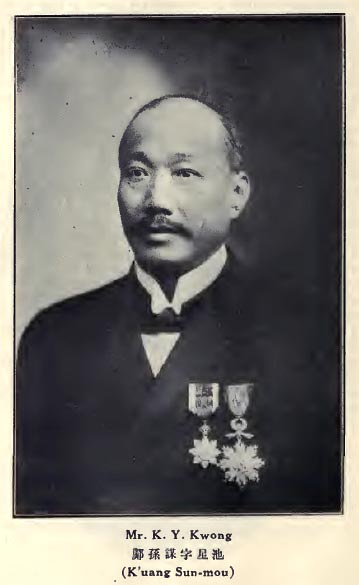

Kuang Sunmou (Note: Chinese: t 鄺孫謀, s 邝孙谋, p Kuàng Sūnmóu, w K'uang Sun-mou.) or K.Y. Kwong (Note: Chinese: w Kwong Kiang-yang.) was a Chinese railway engineer, businessman, and bureaucrat of the late 19th and early 20th century.

A resident of Nanhai, Guangdong Province, he was born in Guangzhou in 1863. He was one of the first Chinese to be sent to America to receive a western education. He started at Williston Seminary in Easthampton, Massachusetts, then enrolled at the Massachusetts Institute of Technology in 1880. He returned to China before graduation to work as an assistant for the Kaiping Mining Company in Tangshan and then as an assistant engineer on the Peking–Mukden Railway from 1886 to 1900. From 1901 to 1903, he was an assistant engineer for the Pinghsiang–Chuchow Railway, before rejoining the Peking–Mukden as a resident engineer from 1903 to 1905. He subsequently served as district engineer on the Peking–Kalgan Railway and chief engineer for the Canton–Hankow Railway, Peking–Sulyuan Railway, and Tientsin–Pukow Railway.

Mr. Kuang was awarded the 5th, 4th, and 3rd orders of Chiaho, the 4th order of Wenfu, and the 4th order of Paokuang Chiaho. He also served as president of the Association of Chinese and American Engineers and the Chinese Engineers' Association.

He was a minister of the Ministry of Communications.
