= Réginald d'Auxion de Ruffé =

French writer (1878–1941)

Baron Réginald d'Auxion de Ruffé
- Born: 1878; Paris
- Died: June 13, 1941 (aged 62–63); Shanghai
- Occupations: Writer, lawyer, journalist
- Spouse(s): Lucie Morel (m. 1909; div. 1929) Selina Jesu

Réginald d'Auxion de Ruffé (1878 – June 13, 1941) was a French writer, journalist and lawyer in the French concession of Shanghai.

Réginald d'Auxion de Ruffé was born in Paris in 1878 to an aristocratic family from southwest France. After studying to become a lawyer, he became a judge in colonial French Indochina and, in 1910, moved to the Shanghai French Concession. In 1909, he married Lucie Morel, the daughter of Louis Jules Morel, Resident-Superior of Tonkin.

He served in World War I, receiving the croix de guerre and médaille militaire, returning to Shanghai in 1918.

D'Auxion de Ruffé published several books and essays on Chinese politics in the 1920s and 1930s, expressing pro-Japanese sympathies. He was also a contributor to Gringoire, a French right-wing newspaper. He was a member of the Société d'économie politique and Cercle de l'Union interalliée.

D'Auxion de Ruffé was prominent in Shanghai social life, being president of the French Club and the Cercle Français, and was a collector of Chinese art and antiquities.

His murder was preceded by that of his friend, Mayor of Shanghai during Japanese occupation Fu Xiaoan on October 11, 1940. On June 13, 1941, d'Auxion de Ruffé was assassinated by two Chinese men, who shot him three times in the neck. He died en route to Sainte-Marie Hospital and was buried in Lokawei Foreign Cemetery in Shanghai.

== Works ==
- Chine et Chinois d'aujourd'hui. Le nouveau péril jaune, 1926
- In the Shadow of the Pagodas, 1926
- Is China Mad?, 1928
- Femmes d'Asie et d'ailleurs, 1929
- Le Capitaine fantôme, 1930
- The Dragon's Bride, 1935
- La bataille de Shanghai, les mauvais bergers, 1938
- Les Fraudes et les imitations dans l'art chinois, 1939
- La farce de l'opium, 1939
- Chine et Japon 1938. Les coulisses du drame, 1939
