= Edward North (classicist) =

American educator and classicist

Edward North (March 9, 1820 – September 13, 1903) was an American educator and classicist who taught ancient languages, primarily Greek, at Hamilton College in Clinton, New York, for 58 years. He was notable as a teacher, and affectionately known as "Old Greek" to his students.

== Early life and career ==
Born in Berlin, Connecticut, to a prosperous Connecticut Valley farming family, North attended local schools and then enrolled at Hamilton, where an uncle, Simeon North, was a professor and later president. He graduated first in his class in 1841, and after working briefly as a private tutor and law clerk, became the principal of a grammar school in Clinton. In 1843, at only 23 years old, he was called back to his alma mater as a professor of ancient languages. As was typical of American college teachers before the mid-nineteenth century, North did not hold an advanced degree.

== Teaching and service ==
In 1862, North was appointed Robinson Professor of Greek, a chair he held until his retirement in 1901. North's main area of interest and expertise was ancient Greek poetry and drama, particularly the work of Theocritus, a bucolic poet of the third century BC whom he greatly admired and enjoyed teaching to his students. He did not publish original research, but was active in a number of scholarly associations and lectured locally and throughout New York state on issues related to history, religion, education, and classical studies.

In recognition of his service to higher education in New York, North received honorary doctoral degrees from the New York state Board of Regents in 1869, and from Madison University (later renamed Colgate) in 1887.

During his one and only leave from the College in 1871-72, North served as secretary to the American legation in Athens, where he visited a number of ancient sites and befriended the renowned German archaeologist Heinrich Schliemann.

North is credited with creating the still-observed Hamilton tradition of the "Half-Century Annalist's Letter," a reminiscence of college life "50 years ago" composed each year by an elected member of the 50th reunion class, and which has become an important ongoing record of the College's history, particularly from a student perspective. Beginning in the 1860's, North would also craft a brief, epigrammatic motto in Greek for each incoming class, many of which are still visible inscribed on older monuments around the Hamilton campus.

Following his death in 1903, the Hamilton trustees renamed the Robinson professorship in North's honor. The chair's first incumbent was North's student and successor, Edward Fitch (1864-1946), who had received a doctorate in classical philology at Göttingen in 1896 supervised by Ulrich von Wilamowitz-Moellendorff.
