= Yung Wing =

Chinese-American diplomat and businessman

- 容閎
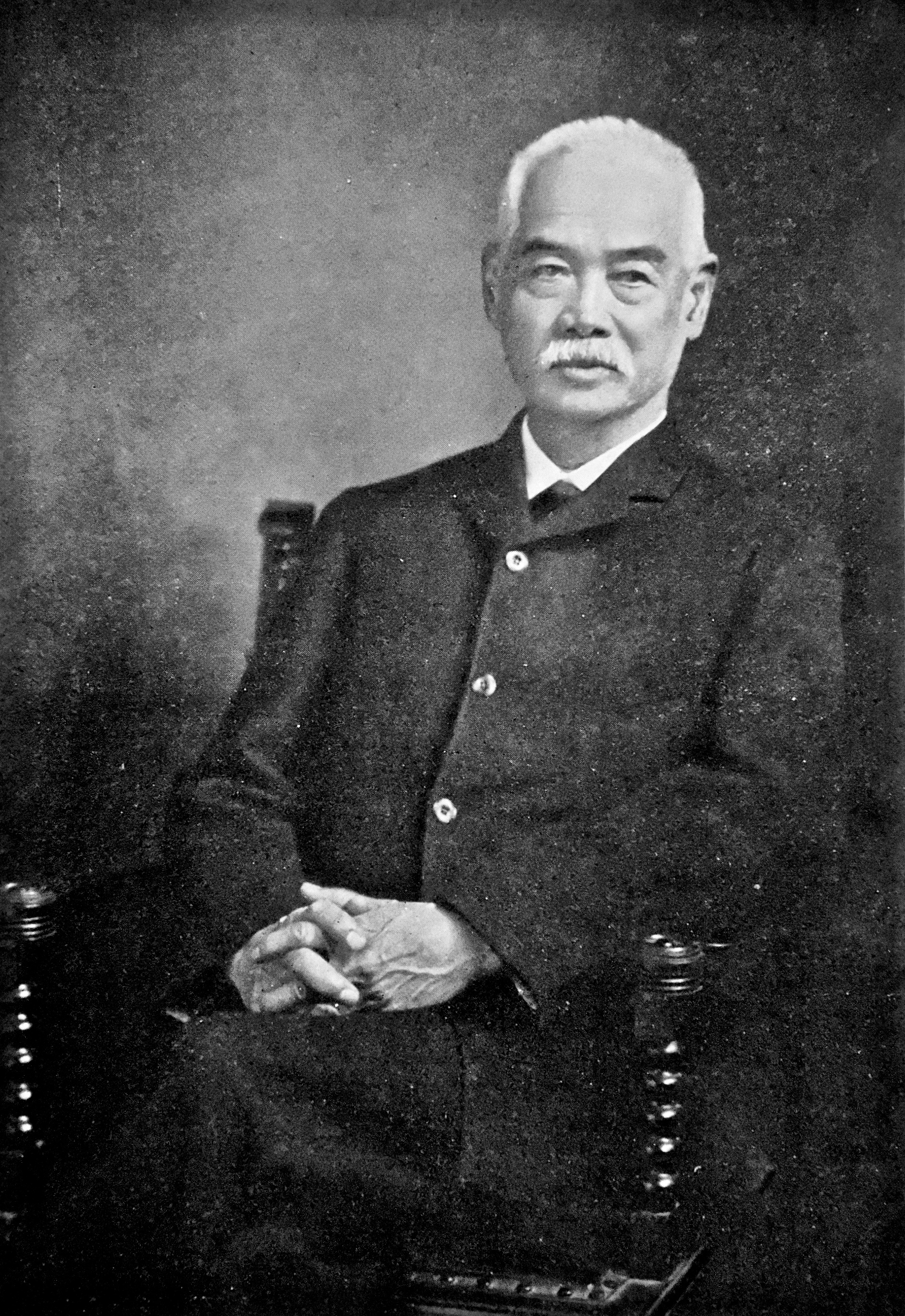
- Yung Wing circa 1909
- Born: November 17, 1828; Nanping, Zhu Hai Guangdong, China
- Died: April 21, 1912 (aged 83); Hartford, Connecticut, U.S.
- Education: Yale University
- Spouse: Mary Kellogg (m. 1876)
- Children: 2

Chinese name
- Traditional Chinese: 容閎
- Simplified Chinese: 容闳
Transcriptions
Standard Mandarin
- Hanyu Pinyin: Róng Hóng
- IPA: [ɻʊ̌ŋ xʊ̌ŋ]
Yue: Cantonese
- Yale Romanization: Yùhng Wàhng
- Jyutping: Jung4 Wang4
- IPA: [jʊŋ˩ wɐŋ˩]

Yung Wing (simplified Chinese: 容闳; traditional Chinese: 容閎; pinyin: Róng Hóng; Jyutping: Jung4 Wang4; November 17, 1828 – April 21, 1912) was a Chinese-American diplomat and businessman. In 1854, he became the first Chinese student to graduate from an American university, Yale College. He was known for bringing students from China to study in the United States on the Chinese Educational Mission. He became a naturalized American citizen, but his status was later revoked under the Chinese Exclusion Act.

== Early life ==
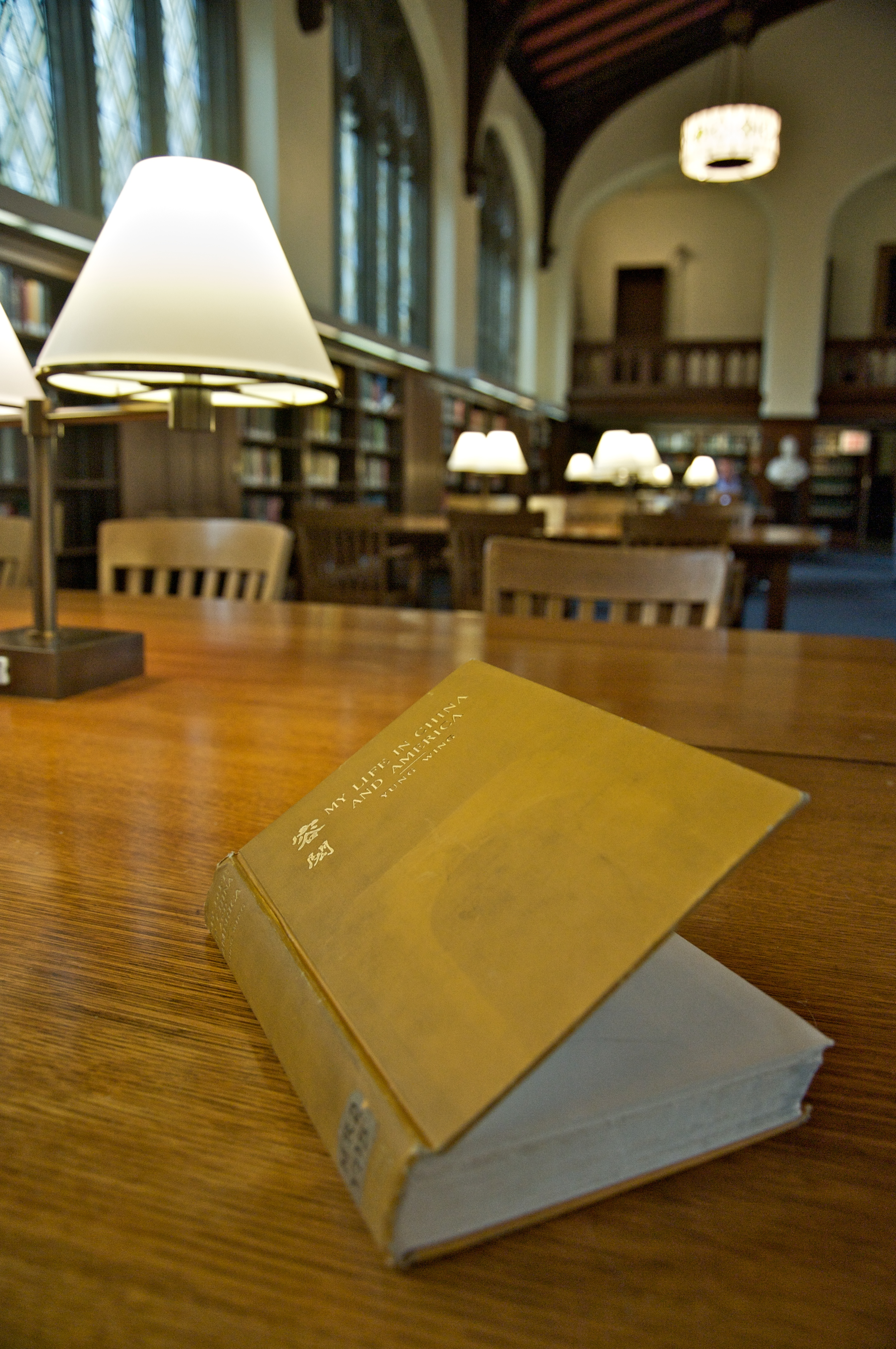
The first edition of My Life in China and America by Yung Wing (1909)

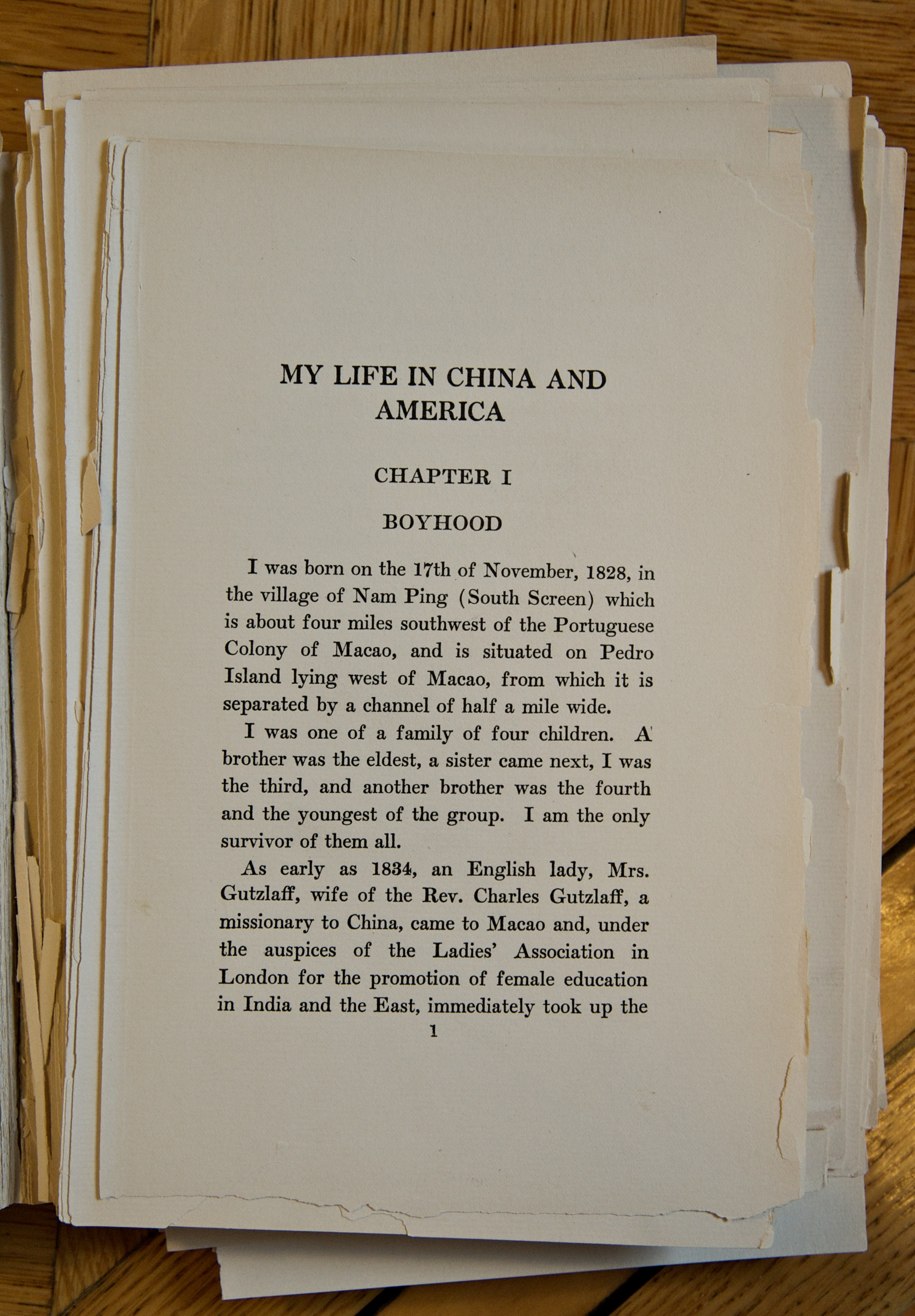
Page One

After receiving his early education at a Mission School in Canton, Yung studied at Yale College, and in 1854 became the first recorded Chinese student to graduate from an American university. He was a member and librarian of Brothers in Unity, a prominent Yale student literary society. His time at Yale was sponsored by Samuel Robbins Brown (1810–1880). In 1851, at the end of his freshman year, Yung wrote to Albert Booth, a fellow alumnus of Munson Academy and "old Yale, where you have the satisfaction + honor to have gone through." Yung asked for Booth's help in acquiring study materials and stated, "Now you know probably the many disadvantages in which I labor aside from these additional studies." He was a member of the Phi chapter of the Delta Kappa Epsilon fraternity.

After finishing his studies, Yung returned to Qing China and worked with Western missionaries as an interpreter. Linguist Stephen Pearl Andrews suspected he was the first Chinese person to achieve near mastery in English.

== Republican activism ==
In 1859, he accepted an invitation to the court of the Taiping rebels in Nanjing, but his proposals aimed at increasing the efficiency of the Taiping Heavenly Kingdom were all eventually refused. In 1863, Yung was dispatched to the United States by Zeng Guofan to buy machinery necessary for opening an arsenal in China capable of producing heavy weapons comparable with those of the western powers. The arsenal later became Jiangnan Shipyard.

He persuaded the Qing government to send young Chinese students to the United States to study science and engineering. With the government's eventual approval, he organized what came to be known as the Chinese Educational Mission, which included 120 young Chinese students, to study in New England beginning in 1872. The Educational Mission was disbanded in 1881, and many of the students later returned to China and made significant contributions to civil services, engineering, and science.

In 1874, he and Hartford Pastor Joseph Twichell traveled to Peru to investigate the living conditions of Chinese coolies working there. Conditions were very brutal for the Chinese, and led to strikes and violent suppression.

Yung was a lifelong supporter of reform in China. He had followed the lead of the Guangxu Emperor, whom Yung described as the great pioneer of reform in China. The coup d'état of 1898 by the Empress Dowager Cixi aborted the Hundred Days' Reform, and many of the reformers were decapitated. A price of $70,000 was placed on Yung's head and he fled Shanghai to British Hong Kong.

While in Hong Kong, he applied to the US Consul to return to the US. In a 1902 letter from the US Secretary of State John Sherman, Yung was informed that his US citizenship, which he had held for 50 years, had been revoked under the Chinese Exclusion Act and he would not be allowed to return to the United States. Through the help of friends, he was able to sneak into the United States in time to see his youngest son, Bartlett, graduate from Yale.

In 1908, Yung joined Homer Lea, the former American military advisor to Kang Youwei, in a bold and audacious military venture in China called the "Red Dragon Plan" that called for organizing a revolutionary conspiracy to conquer Liangguang. Through Yung, Lea planned to solicit a united front of various southern Chinese factions and secret societies to organize an army that he would command for the revolution. If successful, Yung was slated to head a coalition government of revolutionary forces while Lea and his fellow conspirators hoped to receive wide-ranging economic concessions from the new government. The Red Dragon conspiracy subsequently collapsed.

After the Wuchang Uprising in 1911, Sun Yat-sen wrote to Yung, inviting him to join the newly established government. He declined the invitation, citing his advanced years and poor health. He requested his two sons to go in his place.

== Family and legacy ==
Yung was naturalized as an American citizen on October 30, 1852, and in 1876, he married Mary Kellogg, an American. They had two children: Morrison Brown Yung and Bartlett Golden Yung. At Yale's centennial commencement in 1876, Yung received an honorary Doctor of Laws.

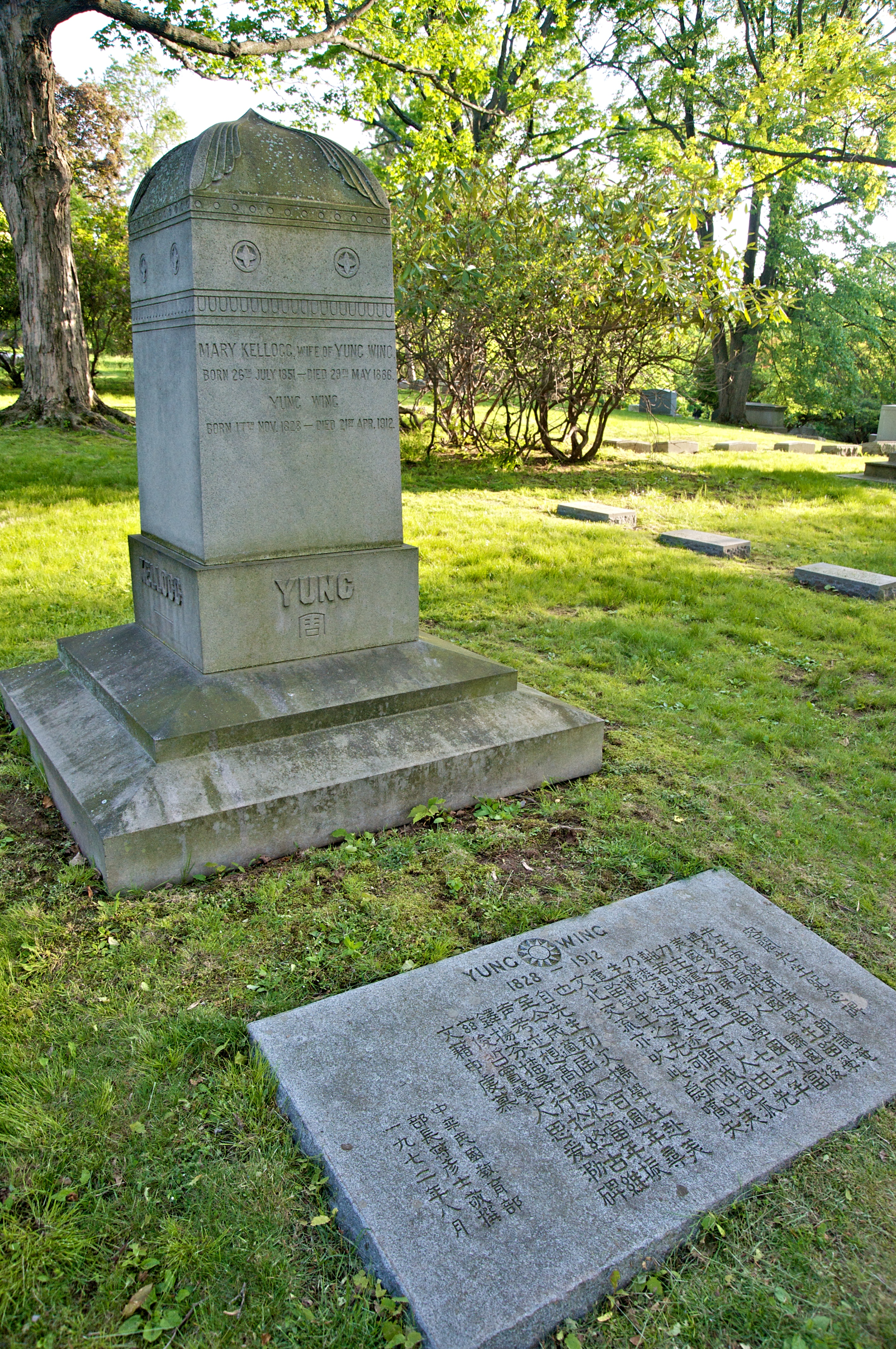
Yung Wing's family plot at Cedar Hill Cemetery.

After the failed 1908 uprising, Yung lived his twilight years in poverty in Hartford, Connecticut, and died in 1912. His grave is located at Cedar Hill Cemetery in Hartford.

P.S. 124, a public elementary school at 40 Division St. in Chinatown in New York City, is named after Yung.

Yung was considered a possible namesake for one of Yale University's new colleges which was completed in 2017.

In the prefecture city of Zhuhai, Guangdong, Yung Wing's hometown, the Yung Wing International Kindergarten is named after him.

== Works ==
- Yung Wing (1909). My Life In China And America. New York: Henry Holt And Company.
